= California State Telegraph Company =

The California State Telegraph Company was a business originally organized to provide telegraph service between San Francisco and Marysville, California. By the spring of 1861, the company had expanded its service area south to Los Angeles, north to Yreka, and east to Fort Churchill by absorbing the other telegraph companies in California (partly through enforcement of its right to the Morse telegraph patent). In 1861, the company formed the Overland Telegraph Company, which was responsible for constructing part of the telegraph line which resulted in the first transcontinental telegraph network in the United States.

The California State Telegraph Company was absorbed into the Western Union Telegraph Company in 1867, with its lines becoming part of Western Union's Pacific Division.

== History ==
=== Original franchise ===
On May 3, 1852, the California State Legislature passed an act to grant an exclusive franchise for the construction and operation of a telegraph line between San Francisco and Marysville. This special charter was granted to Oliver C. Allen and Clark Burnham who formed the California Telegraph Company, which began construction on the line that fall. While the company was able to erect some poles, a fire and lack of funding put an end to the construction.

The following year, in 1853, the company was re-organized and re-incorporated under the name “California State Telegraph Company” which acquired the franchise granted to Allen and Burnham. This company began construction on September 1, 1853, and completed the line several weeks later, on October 24. The new line allowed telegraphic communication between San Francisco and Marysville, via San José, Stockton, and Sacramento.

=== Acquisition of the Alta California Telegraph Company ===
The Alta California Telegraph Company was another early telegraph company in California. This company initially operated a line between Sacramento and Nevada City, eventually extending their service to other mining towns and cities in the state. In July 1856, the company completed a line between San Francisco and Sacramento. This connection reached San Francisco via Benicia and Oakland (having to cross both the Carquinez Strait and San Francisco Bay by means of submarine cable). At times the cables resulted in poor connections, and in 1857 it was decided that a new cable, strung on poles around the bay, would replace the connection between Oakland and San Francisco. As the State company owned the exclusive franchise for telegraphic communications between San Francisco and Marysville, they filed suit against the Alta company. This suit was not resolved until 1863, when the Supreme Court of California upheld the legality of the franchise.

From their beginnings, both the State and Alta companies used telegraphic instruments based on Samuel Morse's patents without proper authorization, although the State company eventually purchased the exclusive right to use Morse's patent in California. After the purchase, the State company and Morse sued the Alta company for using Morse's technology without permission. In July 1860, the U.S. Circuit Court issued an injunction preventing the Alta company from using technology based on the Morse patent. The local newspapers speculated that this would result in the merger of the two companies. Faced with ongoing legal warfare, the Alta company capitulated and merged with the State company in 1860.

=== Acquisition of the other California telegraph companies ===
During the 1850s, other telegraph companies had been organized to provide service to different parts of California and into neighboring Utah Territory. Using their exclusive rights to the Morse patent, the State company was able to acquire and consolidate these companies. The consolidation would also allow for the necessary capital for building a telegraph line to the eastern United States. The State company re-incorporated in April 1861, with their articles of incorporation now reflecting their larger service area. The consolidations were completed by May 1861. The companies acquired by the State company at this time were:

==== The Northern California Telegraph Company ====
The Northern California Telegraph Company was initially organized in 1856 to build and operate a telegraph line north from Marysville to Yreka, in Siskiyou County. The line from Marysville to Shasta was completed on April 17, 1858. Originally, the company planned to build from Shasta to Yreka by way of the Sacramento River, but the route was changed to run via Weaverville, Trinity Center and Scott Valley. In August 1858 the line reached Yreka, putting northern California in communication with Marysville. Later in 1858, the company completed a line between Marysville and Sacramento.

The Northern company did not have the right to use Morse's equipment in California and was sued by the State company and Morse in December 1860. By May 1861 the Northern company's line had become part of the State company.

==== The Pacific and Atlantic Telegraph Company ====
The Pacific and Atlantic Telegraph Company was organized to build and operate a telegraph line between San José and Los Angeles, and then continue it to the eastern United States alongside the Butterfield Overland Mail route. The line was completed to Los Angeles on October 15, 1860, but went no further.

==== The Placerville and Humboldt Telegraph Company ====
The Placerville and Humboldt Telegraph Company was organized in 1858 to build and operate a telegraph line from Placerville, California along the Central Overland Route to Salt Lake City. Because the company's line would extend into Utah Territory, the Utah Territorial Assembly incorporated the "Placerville, Humbolt and Salt Lake Telegraph Company," which was controlled by the same interests as the California company. Frederick Bee served as president of the company. The first telegraph poles were erected by this company on September 2, 1858, in Placerville. The line was completed to Genoa on November 29, 1858, to Carson City in August 1859 and terminated at Fort Churchill in October 1860.

The Placerville and Humboldt company did not have the right to use Morse's equipment in California and was sued by the State company and Morse in May 1860.

In April 1861, plans were underway to consolidate the Placerville and Humboldt company with the State company.

=== Transcontinental telegraph line ===
California State Telegraph Company interests organized the Overland Telegraph Company in April 1861 to build the telegraph line from Fort Churchill east to Salt Lake City. There it would meet the line of the Pacific Telegraph Company and complete the First transcontinental telegraph.

=== Acquisition by the Western Union Telegraph Company ===
In 1866, the Western Union Telegraph Company acquired a controlling interest in California State Telegraph Company. Then in May 1867, the State company ceased operating with the public and its lines became part of Western Union's Pacific Division.

== Bibliography ==
- Bates, Alice L. (1914). "The History of the Telegraph in California". Annual Publication of the Historical Society of Southern California. 9 (3).
- Reid, James D. (1886). The Telegraph in America and Morse Memorial. New York City, New York: John Polhemus.
