= Frederick Bee =

American pioneer lawyer and defender of Chinese rights (1825–1892)

- Portrait by Bradley & Rulofson c. 1879–1888
- Born: Frederick Alonzo Bee; September 9, 1825; Clinton, New York, U.S.
- Died: May 26, 1892 (aged 66); San Francisco, California, U.S.
- Spouse: Catherine Maxwell
- Children: Frank M. Bee; Willie Howard Bee

Catherine Maxwell Bee

Frederick Alonzo Bee (傅列秘; September 9, 1825 – May 26, 1892) was an American early opponent of Anti-Chinese sentiment in the United States. He was a California Gold Rush pioneer, miner, merchant, manager of the Pony Express, builder of the telegraph over the Sierras, developer of Sausalito, California, lobbyist for the San Francisco Chamber of Commerce, official at the Chinese Consulate, and vineyardist near Martinez, California.

Bee Street in Sausalito was named after him. Bee was appointed as Consul by the Chinese government after he effectively represented the interests of the Chinese community in front of a Congressional committee and settled disputes in Chinatown. Bee acted in an official capacity to represent the interests of Chinese immigrants, and appeared in federal court cases; his efforts to preserve harmony were recognized by the Emperor of China. October, 2015 Sierra Heritage magazine featured Frederick Bee in a 4-page article written by Lj Bottjer. Sherri Bergmann wrote an article for the January 22, 2018, Mountain Democrat.

California Assemblymember Marc Levine authored a resolution to commemorate the 125th anniversary of the death of Frederick A. Bee. New York Assembly member Ken Blankenbush authored a proclamation to commemorate the 125th anniversary of the death of Bee.

== Early life and family ==
Bee was one of eight children born in Clinton, Oneida County, New York, to John Bee and Mary (Wilson) Bee on September 9, 1825. Bee's parents had emigrated from Northumberland, England.

Bee's wife, Catherine Maxwell, was born on March 7, 1828, in Ballston Spa, New York, and died on August 18, 1889, in San Francisco, California.

Bee and his wife had two sons. Frank M. Bee was born on August 11, 1851, in New York, and died on June 22, 1895, in San Francisco. Willie Howard Bee was born on December 20, 1853, in Placerville, California, and died on November 10, 1855, in Placerville.

== California Gold Rush ==
In late 1855, Bee had a successful mining operation employing 20 Chinese workers on Ledge Bar.

Bee received 2,767 votes as an American Party candidate to be a member of the Assembly for El Dorado County in the election of 1856 but did not win the election.

== Telegraph and Pony Express ==
=== The Grapevine ===
In May, 1858, the Placerville and Humboldt Telegraph Company was formed, with Bee as one of the incorporators. The mission of the company was to build a telegraph from Placerville, California, to Carson Valley, Nevada Territory, to Salt Lake City, Utah Territory.

In September, 1858 the Placerville and Humboldt Telegraph Company incorporated and elected Bee as president. George Chorpenning and his brother were the largest shareholders; Frederick Bee, his wife Catherine Bee, and his brother Albert W. Bee, Sr., were also shareholders. On November 30, 1858, Bee wrote to William M. Gwin to encourage a government subsidy to complete the telegraph to Salt Lake City, Utah Territory. Legislative Assembly of Utah Territory approved the incorporation of Placerville, Humboldt and Salt Lake Telegraph Company on January 21, 1859.
Bee announced the impending completion of the telegraph line in San Francisco in August, 1859.

This initial telegraph came to be known as the "Grapevine", and would spawn the modern expression "heard it through the grapevine":

That curious and vivid Western phrase, "grapevine telegraph," originated in 1859. Colonel Bee constructed a telegraph line between Placerville and Virginia City, attaching the wire to the trees; their swaying stretched it until it lay in loops on the ground, resembling the trailing California grapevines. Frequent breaks occurred from falling trees and avalanches, till the line became almost useless, being sometimes beaten into Sacramento by the Pony Express. California and Nevada newspapers took it up, and whenever a journalist wished to cast doubts on the freshness of his opponent's news he forthwith accused him of running a grapevine telegraph. But in the spring of 1861 the Overland Company pushed into the Sierras and successfully connected Virginia City with Sacramento by a modern telegraph wire on poles.

— Charles Howard Shinn, The Story of the Mine (1896)

Colonel Bee's Grapevine soon became proverbial for dubious communication. In September 1864, during the Civil War, a contributor to the Quarterly Review of Danville, Kentucky, wrote that though men of the South had moved their families north and taken the oath of allegiance to the Union, many had returned to fight for the South at their pleasure despite their oaths: "Thousands of rebel men have left their wives and children behind, among us, to enjoy all the plenty and protection of the land, who are in constant intercourse by the public mails, as well as by the grapevine, with them, and publicly and secretly doing all they can to give aid to the rebel movements." Reflecting on the Civil War thirty years later, author Martha McCulloch Williams wrote in 1893 that in conquered territories, "The only news came over the 'grapevine telegraph,' which ran from Nowhere into Space—and, it is safe to say, recorded more marvels than ever went over a wire."

=== Pacific Telegraph Company ===
Theodore Judah, William M. Gwin, Albert W. Bee, Sr., George Chorpening, Manuel M. Noah and Frederick Bee were sojourning in Washington, D.C., in March, 1860. Pacific Telegraph Act of 1860 was approved on June 16, 1860. Hiram Sibley, of Rochester, New York, was awarded the contract to construct the Pacific Telegraph in September,1860” In May, 1861 Pacific Telegraph Company formed in Rochester, New York and Albert W. Bee, Sr. was elected as a director.
At 10 pm on October 26, 1861, this message from San Francisco was received by Cyrus W. Field in New York, “The Pacific telegraph calls the Atlantic cable AW Bee”. In November, 1861 Albert W. Bee, Sr. resigned from Pacific Telegraph Company.
Albert W. Bee, Sr. died in November, 1863 in Austin, Nevada Territory. Albert Bee was engaged in silver mining in Reese River Valley.

=== Pony Express ===
“Leavenworth & Pike's Peak Express, the organizers of the Pony Express applied for articles of incorporation by the legislature of Kansas territory, which were passed by that body and approved by Gov. S. Medary on February 13, 1860. Besides the three original members of the firm the incorporators included General Superintendent BF Ficklin together with FA Bee, WW Finney and John S Jones, all tried and trustworthy stage employees, who were retained on account of their wide experience in the overland traffic business." "The first Westbound Pony Express trip left St. Joseph on April 3, 1860 and arrived ten days later in San Francisco, California, on April 14." The Pony Express ended on October 26, 1861.

== Railroads and steamships ==
In 1865, Bee testified in front of the Committee on Railroads, Nevada Legislature. He indicated he was involved in railroad construction. Bee advertised for laborers to build the San Francisco and Humboldt Railroad in Sausalito, California in April, 1868. The Sausalito Land and Ferry Company sold lots in Sausalito in June, 1868. This advertisement referred readers to contact Bee about the prospects and conditions of the San Francisco and Humboldt Railroad. Bee sued the San Francisco and Humboldt Railroad for $39,050 in February, 1870 for expenditures and money supplied to the railroad. Bee won his lawsuit against San Francisco and Humboldt Railroad in July, 1873.

Bee, managing agent of the New York and San Francisco Steamship Line, met with the President in May, 1870 to discuss a subsidy for steamships to run between San Francisco and Australia. In December, 1870 the San Francisco Chamber of Commerce appointed Bee to lobby Congress for a subsidy to run steamships from San Francisco to Australia. The subsidy was denied.

Central Polynesia Land and Commercial Company was formed in December, 1871 to build coal stations and to lease and to cultivate land in Samoa. Bee was a trustee. The activities of the Central Polynesia Land and Commercial Company were more complex than outlined in their articles of incorporation. The Central Polynesia Land and Commercial Company went bankrupt in October, 1873. Samoan Commercial and Land Company formed in March, 1874. Frederick Bee was a shareholder. The Samoan Commercial and Land Company went bankrupt in late 1876.

Edward S. Salomon and Frederick Bee worked for the Olympia Railroad and Coal Mining Company starting in August, 1873. Bee was the manager of the Olympia Railway and Mining Company in 1874. By 1876, Bee described himself as a capitalist, not as a manager, because the Olympia Railroad and Coal Mining Company was not a successful venture for Bee and Edward Salomon.

== Opposition to Chinese exclusion ==
"A Philanthropic Crank," a caricature of Bee published in The Wasp, May 16, 1885

As anti-Chinese agitation grew in California and across the country, Chinese took action. Chinese Consolidated Benevolent Association, known as "The Six Companies," took legal action, and Bee joined in their defense. The 1876 Republican National Convention recommended that Congress investigate Chinese immigration. In July, 1876, while the anti-Chinese hysteria was at its height, Congress provided for a joint committee to go to California to investigate. When no attorney agreed to represent the interests of Chinese residents, Senator Oliver P. Morton of Indiana, chairman of the committee, asked Bee to act as attorney for the Chinese, and he agreed. On October 18, the Committee requested the presence of Bee and others. On February 27, 1877, the Report of the Joint Special Committee to Investigate Chinese Immigration concluded that the Chinese population had few desirable characteristics.

A group of 3000 Irish workers met in San Francisco in November, 1878 to protest statements Bee made in the Washington Post. Envoys Chen Lanbin and Yung Wing investigated Bee, who had helped the Chinese to settle disputes, and found him worthy of the appointment. The Chinese consulate opened in San Francisco in December, 1878 with Bee as a consul. Bee also investigated murders of Chinese residents in the Western United States. He went to the sites of the Rock Springs massacre in Wyoming to investigate the massacres that had taken place and forced the United States government to pay the Chinese government some US$500,000 in indemnities. He collected the names of the white assailants, but found that the United States attorney had left for Illinois.

Bee wrote to the Senate in 1882 when Congress was debating the Chinese Exclusion Act. He protested the Act, writing that "I believe that the immortal truths of the Declaration of Independence came from the same source with the Golden Rule and the Sermon on the Mount...... As surely as the path on which our fathers entered a hundred years ago led to safety, to strength, to glory, so surely will the path on which we now propose to enter bring us to shame, to weakness, and to peril." He argued that if the American local and central governments ignored the crimes against Chinese in the United States. then Americans in China would be massacred in return.

Bee was appointed a Mandarin of the Blue Button by the Chinese Government in April, 1882.

Huang Zunxian was a poet and diplomat who became Consul General in San Francisco in May, 1882 and wrote a poem about Bee expressing his approval:

"After several years of hardship, I am writing a poem about my comrade;
When someone’s guts are bigger than his body, his spirit is naturally heroic and fearless.
When will the days of chasing after petty gains and losses come to an end?
Even in smiling, he always carried a boot dagger. "

One of Bee's duties was to verify the residency status of Chinese passengers, who had petitioned for writs of habeas corpus, so a judge could decide if the petitioners were allowed to remain in the United States.

In July 1885, the San Francisco Board of Supervisors published a report on the condition of Chinese residents. The report concluded that the residents of Chinatown lived in crowded conditions, lacked census data, supported prostitution, and condoned white women living with Chinese men.

In February, 1886, Bee published, "The Other Side of the Chinese Question. To the people of the United States and the honorable the Senate and House of Representatives. Testimony of California's leading citizens. Read and judge", as a response to the Board of Supervisors' report.

Bee testified in front of the Congressional Joint Committee on Immigration and Naturalization on December 6, 1890, in San Francisco, California in an attempt to refute the "evils" of Chinese immigration. The Geary Act was signed on May 6, 1892, to extend the Chinese Exclusion Act and to remove bail in habeas corpus cases for Chinese immigration cases.

== Viticulturalist ==
On 15 October 1886, Bee bought 60 acres in Martinez, California. Bee grew 40 acres of Tokay, mixed wine, Rose Peru and Black Hamburg grapes. The Bee Ranch was on the hill between Vine Hill Way and Morello Avenue.

His nephew, Frederick Bee Tompkins, inherited his vineyard.

== Death ==
Bee died of a heart-attack May 26, 1892, in San Francisco. On the day of the funeral, the streets of Chinatown were packed and a group of merchants went to the church where the services were held. White mourners sat on the left side of the aisle, while Chinese sat on the right, one of the few times the two races came together. The Chinese Consulate sent a large heart made of flowers on behalf of the Qing government with an inscription calling him “Our Colonel”.

== References and further reading ==
- Bee, Fred A. (1886). The Other Side of the Chinese Question: To the People of the United States and the Honorable the Senate and House of Representatives, Testimony of California's Leading Citizens, Read and Judge. San Francisco, February, 1886. San Francisco: Woodward & Co., printers San Francisco. Free online at Internet Archive HERE
- Pomfret, John (2016). The Beautiful Country and the Middle Kingdom: America and China, 1776 to the Present. New York: Henry Holt and Company. ISBN 9780805092509.
- Qin, Yucheng (2009). The Diplomacy of Nationalism: The Six Companies and China's Policy toward Exclusion. Honolulu: University of Hawai'i Press. ISBN 9780824832742.
