= Horace Carpentier =

American politician

Horace Walpole Carpentier
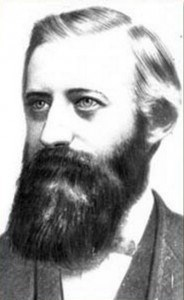
- Born: July 19, 1824; Galway, New York, United States
- Died: January 31, 1918 (aged 93); New York City, New York
- Education: Columbia University (BA)

Horace Walpole Carpentier (1824–1918) was a lawyer and the first mayor of Oakland, California. He is also remembered as president of the Overland Telegraph Company and for defrauding the Peralta family, a prominent Californio family who historically owned much of the East Bay during the Spanish and Mexican eras, from their lands.

== Life ==
Carpentier was born in Galway, New York, in July 1824. He graduated Valedictorian with the Class of 1848 at Columbia College.

=== California ===
Carpentier came to California during the California gold rush, as he is listed as a passenger on the ship Panama in the New York Herald, February 6, 1849. In 1854, he was appointed "Major General" of the California State Militia.

On May 4, 1852 Horace Carpentier persuaded the new California state legislature to incorporate Oakland as a town. Then, on May 17, he persuaded the new town's trustees to pass an ordinance "for the disposal of the waterfront belonging to the town of Oakland." That ordinance gave complete, lucrative control of Oakland's waterfront to Carpentier. When this was discovered in 1855 after he had been elected Oakland's first mayor in 1854, he was ousted by an angry citizenry and replaced by Charles Campbell who became Mayor on March 5, 1855.

Carpentier presided over the California State Telegraph Company, before heading the Overland Telegraph Company. The Overland was formed in order to construct the western portion of the transcontinental telegraph. On October 24, 1861, Carpentier sent the first telegram from the west to the east over the newly completed transcontinental telegraph line. The telegram was addressed to President Abraham Lincoln: "I announce to you that the telegraph to California has this day been completed. May it be a bond of perpetuity between the states of the Atlantic and those of the Pacific".

Carpentier notoriously represented members of the Peralta family, the original Spanish land grant owners of the entire region now encompassing Oakland and Berkeley, in various legal proceedings ostensibly initiated to protect their holdings. The end result of these proceedings was that Carpentier himself received large chunks of what remained of their holdings as compensation for his services. Carpentier similarly represented and took advantage of the Moraga family and ultimately acquired most of their Rancho Laguna de los Palos Colorados,. Carpentier also acquired part of Rancho San Ramon.

=== Return to New York ===
By 1888, Carpentier had moved back to New York City. He had a second home in Galway in Saratoga County, New York. He was elected to the board of trustees of Columbia University, his alma mater, in 1906, serving until his death. He died at his home on January 31, 1918.

=== Contributing to the Dean Lung endowment at Columbia ===
Carpentier contributed $250,000 to an endowment that initiated Chinese studies at Columbia University and helped to catalyse broader East Asian studies at the university. This was done in honor of his valet Dean Lung, who in 1902 had contributed $12,000 of his savings to the establishment of Chinese Studies at Columbia. In the same year, sinologist Friedrich Hirth was appointed the first Dean Lung professor of Chinese, soon receiving a substantial collection of books from the Chinese government. To mark the establishment of the foundation of the Dean Lung Chair of Chinese at Columbia, Herbert Giles gave a series of lectures titled "China and the Chinese". Endowed professors include David Der-wei Wang, Madeleine Zelin (current), Luther Carrington Goodrich and Hans Bielenstein.

=== Family life ===
Carpentier remained single his entire life, although he seems to have shared a household with his cousin Harriet for many years in Oakland. (Several references mention Harriet as his niece, but the 1880 US census for Oakland and the 1900 Census for New York show "sister", although in fact she was a second cousin). Their brother Edward also lived with them for a time. The Carpentier home was located in the oldest section of Oakland at Alice and Third Streets. Alice Street was named for his other sister. Carpentier had another brother, James S. Carpentier, in whose name he made a donation to Columbia University. He made another donation in the name of his mother, Henrietta Carpentier, and another in the name of his brother Edward.

Political offices
Preceded by new office	Mayor of Oakland, California; 1854—1855	Succeeded by Charles Campbell
