= Central Overland Route =

Trail from Salt Lake City to Carson City

The Central Overland Route (also known as the "Central Overland Trail", "Central Route", "Redden's Way", "Simpson's Route", or the "Egan Trail") was a transportation route from Salt Lake City, Utah south of the Great Salt Lake through the mountains of central Nevada to Carson City, Nevada. For a decade after 1859, until the first Transcontinental Railroad was completed in 1869, it served a vital role in the transport of emigrants, mail, freight, and passengers between California, Nevada, and Utah.

== History ==
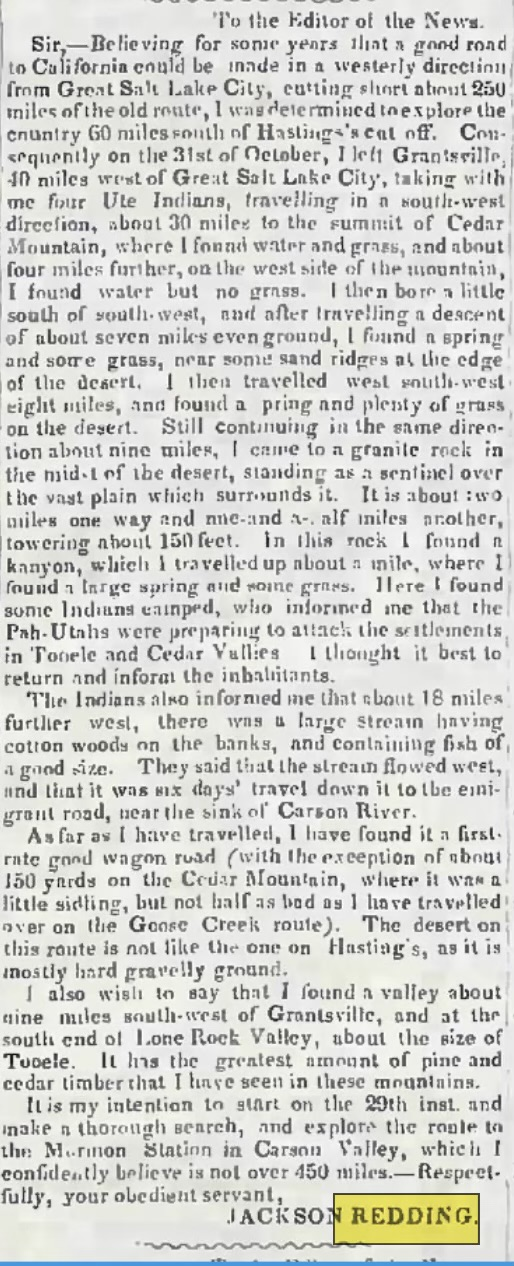
Jackson Redden - Letter to Editor(Deseret News 1853)

The route was initially scouted and staked in 1851 by Return Jackson Redden, a Mormon trailblazer and explorer. He published these findings in the Deseret News in 1853.

In 1855 Howard Egan used the route to drive livestock between Salt Lake City and California. Egan's diary, " Pioneering the West", credits Redden for direction. This trail led straight through the high mountain ranges that most earlier explorers had worked so hard to avoid.

Redden and Egan had discovered a series of mountain passes/springs that aligned to allow an almost straight path across the middle of Utah and Nevada. The Schell Creek Range could be crossed at Schellbourne Pass, the Cherry Creek Range at Egan Canyon, the Ruby Mountains at Overland Pass, the Diamond Mountains at another Overland Pass, the Toiyabe Range at Emigrant Pass, and the Desatoya Mountains at Basque Summit (all of these place names came later).

Although many smaller ranges and two large deserts also had to be traversed, the reduction in length over the "standard" California Trail route along the Humboldt River by about 280 miles (450 km) made this route about two weeks faster for emigrants getting to (or from) California. After it was developed many California emigrants and returning emigrants used this route.

== Improvement ==
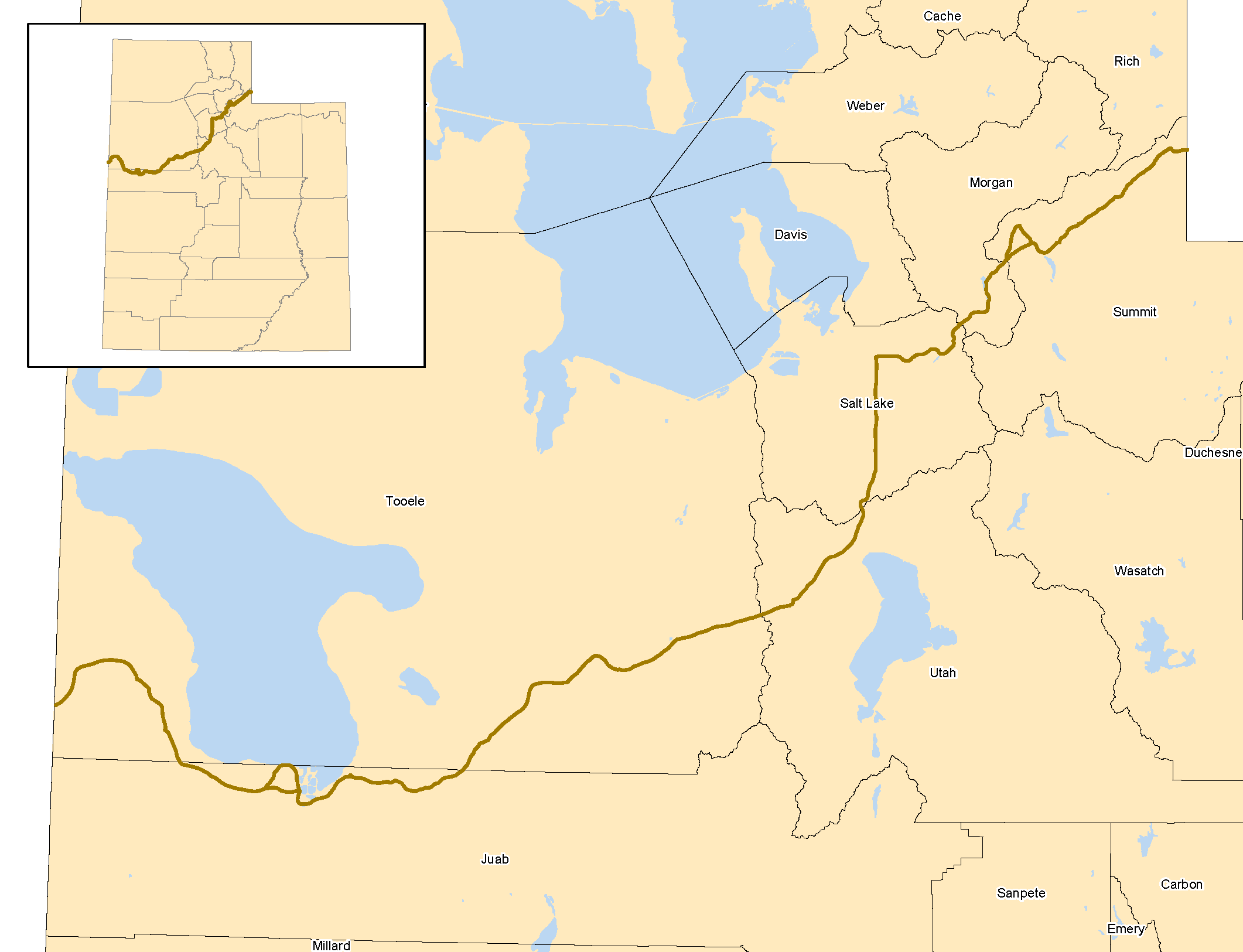
The Central Route in Utah

In 1858, hearing of the overland route, the U.S. Army sent an expedition led by Captain James H. Simpson to survey it for a military road to get supplies to the Army's Camp Floyd in Utah. Simpson came back with a surveyed route that was also about 280 miles (450 km) shorter than the "standard" California Trail route along the Humboldt River.

The Army then improved the trail and springs for use by wagons and stagecoaches in 1859 and 1860. When the approaching American Civil War closed the heavily subsidized Butterfield Overland Mail southwestern route to California along the Gila River, George Chorpenning immediately realized the value of this more direct route, and shifted his existing mail and passenger line from the "Northern Humboldt Route" along the Humboldt River.

In 1861 John Butterfield, who since 1858 had been using the Butterfield Overland Mail route through the deserts of the American Southwest, also switched to the Central Route to avoid possible hostilities during the American Civil War. The various stage lines, by traveling day and night and changing their teams at about 10 miles (16 km) to 20 miles (32 km) intervals, could get light freight, passengers, and mail to or from Missouri River towns to California in about 25–28 days.

Gold and Silver mined in California and Nevada were often part of the cargo going east as the Civil War consumed vast sums of money. Nearly all stage lines were heavily subsidized to carry the mail. After the American Civil War, Wells Fargo & Co. absorbed the Butterfield stage lines and ran stage coaches and freight wagons along the Central Route as well as developing the first agriculture in the Ruby Valley in Nevada to help support their livestock. The Army established Fort Ruby at the southern end of Ruby Valley in Nevada to protect travelers against marauding Indians along the road. The Army abandoned Camp Floyd in 1860 as the soldiers were reassigned back east to fight the Civil War.

In 1860, William Russell's Pony Express used this route across Utah and Nevada for part of their fast 10-day mail delivery from St. Joseph, Missouri to Sacramento, California. In 1861, soon after the completion of the First Transcontinental Telegraph, the Pony Express was discontinued as the Transcontinental Telegraph now could provide quicker and cheaper communication from the East to the West.

== Telegraph ==
Under pressure and subsidies from the U.S. Congress to establish rapid east-west communication in 1860 Hiram Sibley, the president of the Western Union Company, formed a consortium between Western Union and the telegraph companies in California to construct the First Transcontinental Telegraph. The telegraph line was authorized and subsidized by the U.S. Congress and went from Omaha, Nebraska to Carson City, Nevada.

The newly consolidated Overland Telegraph Company of California, which had already built a telegraph line to Carson City, would build the line eastward from Carson City using the newly developed Central Route through Nevada and Utah. At the same time, the Pacific Telegraph Company of Nebraska, formed by Sibley, would construct a line westward from Omaha, Nebraska along the eastern part of the California and Oregon Trails. The lines would meet at a station in Salt Lake City, Utah.

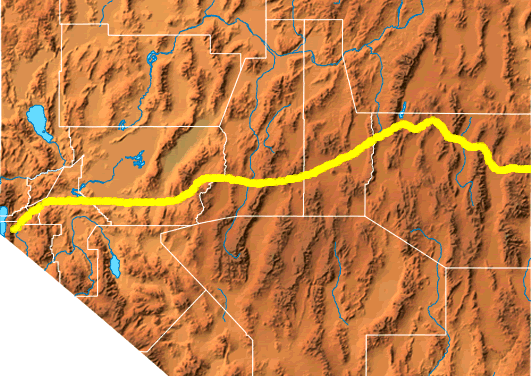
The Central Route in Nevada

Telegraph lines, insulators (shipped around Cape Horn to California) and telegraph poles for the line were collected in late 1860, and rapid construction proceeded during the second half of 1861. Major problems were encountered in finding telegraph poles on the treeless plains of the Midwest and the nearly treeless deserts of the Great Basin. The telegraph line from Omaha reached Salt Lake City on October 18, 1861, and the line from Carson City to Salt Lake City was completed six days later, on October 24, 1861—about a year ahead of predictions.

== Literary accounts ==
Several accounts of travel along the Central Route have been published. In July 1859 Horace Greeley made the trip, at a time when Chorpenning was using only the eastern segment (they reconnected with the Humboldt River trail near present-day Beowawe). Greeley published his detailed observations in his 1860 book "An Overland Journey from New York to San Francisco".

In October 1860 the English explorer Richard Burton traveled the entire route at a time when the Pony Express was operating. He gave detailed descriptions of each of the way stations in his 1861 book The City of the Saints, Across the Rocky Mountains to California.

In the summer of 1861 Samuel Clemens (who only later used the pen name Mark Twain) traveled the route with his brother Orion on their way to Nevada's new territorial capital in Carson City, but provided only sparse descriptions of the road in his 1872 book Roughing It.

== Obsolescence ==
In 1869 the First transcontinental railroad was completed using the more level route along the Humboldt River to the north—along much of the original California Trail route. Passengers and freight were now carried faster and cheaper than on the stage and freight lines using the old route.

Alongside the railroad a new telegraph line was constructed. It was easier to maintain and supply operators, relay stations, etc. using the railroad; the Central Route was now obsolete for the telegraph as well. The stage and telegraph relay stations were abandoned, and the soldiers at Fort Ruby were transferred north to Fort Halleck to protect the railroad.
