= Benjamin Franklin Ficklin =

Benjamin Franklin Ficklin (1827–1871) was an American soldier, adventurer, and entrepreneur known for his help in starting the Pony Express and for establishing other stage coach and mail routes in the United States during the nineteenth century. Ficklin was also one of the people responsible for the creation of the Pacific Telegraph Company in 1861.

== Biography ==
=== Early days ===
Born in Albemarle County, Virginia in 1827, Ficklin had a reputation for misbehaving. So in 1845, his father sent young Ficklin to attend the Virginia Military Institute. As a cadet, Ficklin was known for his pranks, and he often got in trouble for them. One night, he filled a howitzer with gunpowder, turned it toward the cadet barracks, and discharged it (Virginia Military Institute Archives, 2005). This action resulted in his suspension in 1846.

=== Career ===
With his suspension, Ficklin entered the Army. He ultimately served as a corporal in the Mexican–American War, where he was injured but recovered. Ficklin requested to be readmitted into the corps of cadets at the Virginia Military Institute, and his request was approved. Upon graduation, Ficklin attempted to work as a teacher. Dissatisfied, he sought employment with an express company in Alabama. Later, he worked as a surveyor for varied freight lines.

Ficklin was ubiquitous at a number of important moments during the Utah War, including the raid on Fort Lemhi which signaled Deseret's demise.

In 1859, Ficklin returned to the express and stage business which now boomed with the western expansion precipitated in the wave of Gold Rush fever. In 1860, some credit him with the idea of the Pony Express. Yet, William Hepburn Russell, Alexander Majors, and William B. Waddell are more often credited as the founders, owners, and operators of the Pony Express. Ficklin did serve as general manager for the venture, until a disagreement with Russell. Russell allegedly became jealous of Ficklin's popularity and suspicious of Ficklin's loyalties. Learning of this, Ficklin immediately resigned.

In 1860, the Pacific Telegraph Act of 1860 called for the facilitation of communication between the east and west coasts of the United States of America. Hiram Sibley of the Western Union Telegraph Company won the contract. In 1861, Ficklin joined Hiram Sibley in helping to form the Pacific Telegraph Company of Nebraska. At the same time, Jeptha Wade was asked by Hiram Sibley to consolidate smaller telegraph companies in California. While the Pacific Telegraph Company built west from Omaha, Nebraska, the Overland Telegraph Company of California was thus formed and built east from Carson City, Nevada. With their connection in Salt Lake City, Utah on October 24, 1861, the final link between the east and west coasts of the United States of America was made. The First Transcontinental Telegraph would ironically lead to the immediate demise of the Pony Express. The Pacific Telegraph Company and Overland Telegraph Company of California were eventually absorbed into the Western Union Telegraph Company.

During the Civil War, Ficklin joined the Confederate States of America's war effort in Virginia. He eventually served as a Confederate purchasing agent in Europe and as an intelligence officer. During the war, he achieved some status. In 1864, he bought Thomas Jefferson’s Monticello, but it was returned to the estate of the previous owner, Uriah Phillips Levy, after the war. The Confederacy had confiscated it in 1864 under the Confederate States of America's Sequestration Act, as the property was owned by a northerner.

In 1865, Ficklin was sent on a secret peace mission to Washington, D.C. While there, Abraham Lincoln was assassinated, and Ficklin was arrested. He was cleared of suspicion and released upon his swearing a loyalty oath to the Union.

After the Civil War, Major Ficklin opened an express stagecoach business in Texas. The route served from Fort Smith, Arkansas, to California. He founded a town in Texas to serve his enterprise. After his death, the town was named after him. Today, Ben Ficklin, Texas, is a ghost town.

In the course of his final business venture, which included a U.S. Post Office subcontract, Ficklin frequently visited Washington, DC.

=== Personal life ===
In March 1871, he was dining at the Willard hotel in Washington, D.C. when a fishbone lodged in his throat. He died a few days later, after a physician cut an artery while trying to remove the bone.

He is buried in Maplewood Cemetery in Charlottesville, Virginia.

Benjamin Franklin Ficklin died childless. However, a descendant of William Franklin Ficklin, a sibling of Benjamin Franklin Ficklin's grandfather, Benjamin Ficklin; Jared Ficklin, (2nd cousin 6 times removed to B. F. Ficklin) a future technologist and for a brief time a cowboy, would later appear on the PBS reality show Texas Ranch House.
