= Alta California Telegraph Company =

The Alta California Telegraph Company (also referred to simply as the Alta Telegraph Company) was a telegraph company which operated in the mid-19th century within the state of California prior to the construction of the Transcontinental Telegraph. It was organized in July 1852, and incorporated in January 1854 and began constructing its first line that same year, stretching from Sacramento to Marysville and extending up into the foothills of the adjacent Sierra Nevada mountains. In subsequent years, a line was constructed between Sacramento and Benicia. From Benicia, a branch line was extended to Vallejo and the US Navy yard at Mare Island.

The principal offices of the company were located in San Francisco (153 Montgomery Street at Merchant St.), and Sacramento in the historic Hastings Building on Second Street.

== Extension to San Francisco ==
In July 1856, the company completed a line between San Francisco and Sacramento. This connection reached San Francisco via Benicia and Oakland (having to cross both the Carquinez Strait and San Francisco Bay by means of submarine cable). At times the cables resulted in poor connections, and ultimately failed entirely after a short time. In 1857 it was decided that a new cable—strung on poles around the bay—would replace the connection between Oakland and San Francisco.

The submarine cable under the Carquinez Strait was replaced at least once, with the company laying a new iron covered cable in April 1859.

=== Telegraph Road ===
The company's cable was run across the Carquinez Strait between Benicia and Martinez, and a connecting line constructed from Martinez to Oakland over the Berkeley Hills (then called the Contra Costa Range). It was this line which gave rise to the name "Telegraph Road" for the thoroughfare which the line followed down the western slope of the hills, which later became Telegraph Avenue in Oakland and Berkeley.

== Lawsuits ==
The California State Telegraph Company owned the exclusive franchise for telegraphic communications between San Francisco and Marysville, which had been granted by the California State Legislature in 1852. Following the Alta company's extension into San Francisco, the State company filed suit. This suit was not resolved until 1863, when the Supreme Court of California upheld the legality of the franchise.

From their beginnings, both the Alta and State companies used telegraphic instruments based on Samuel Morse's patents without proper authorization, although the State company eventually purchased the exclusive right to use Morse's patent in California. After the purchase, the State company and Morse sued the Alta company for using Morse's technology without permission. In July 1860, the U.S. Circuit Court issued an injunction preventing the Alta company from using technology based on the Morse patent. The local newspapers speculated that this would result in the merger of the two companies.

== Mergers ==
Soon after the Morse lawsuit, the Alta Telegraph Company decided to merge into the California State Telegraph Company, which itself was eventually incorporated into the nationwide Western Union.

== Bibliography ==
- Bates, Alice L. (1914). "The History of the Telegraph in California". Annual Publication of the Historical Society of Southern California. 9 (3): 181–187. doi:10.2307/41168703. JSTOR 41168703.
- Langley, Henry G.; Morison, Samuel A. (1859). The State Register and Year Book of Facts for the Year 1859. San Francisco: Commercial Steam Printing Establishment. pp. 162–163.
- Reid, James D. (1886). The Telegraph in America and Morse Memorial. New York City, New York: John Polhemus.
