= Pacific Telegraph Act of 1860 =

- Long title: An Act to Facilitate Communication between the Atlantic and Pacific States by Electric Telegraph
- Enacted by: the 36th United States Congress

Citations
- Statutes at Large: 12 Stat. 41

Legislative history
- Introduced in the Senate as S. 84 by William M. Gwin on January 18, 1860; Signed into law by President James Buchanan on June 16, 1860

The Pacific Telegraph Act of 1860 (also known as "An Act to Facilitate Communication between the Atlantic and Pacific States by Electric Telegraph"), was an Act of Congress that authorized the U.S. Treasury to fund the construction of a telegraph line across the continental United States. It was signed into law by President James Buchanan on June 16, 1860, and called for the facilitation of communication between the east and west coasts of the United States of America. Hiram Sibley of the Western Union Telegraph Company won the contract. In 1861, Benjamin Franklin Ficklin joined Hiram Sibley in helping to form the Pacific Telegraph Company of Nebraska. At the same time, Jeptha Wade was asked by Hiram Sibley to consolidate smaller telegraph companies in California. While the Pacific Telegraph Company built west from Omaha, Nebraska, the Overland Telegraph Company of California was thus formed and built east from Carson City, Nevada. With their connection in Salt Lake City, Utah on October 24, 1861, the final link between the east and west coasts of the United States of America was made by telegraph. The First Transcontinental Telegraph led to the immediate demise of the Pony Express. The Pacific Telegraph Company and the Overland Telegraph Company of California were eventually absorbed into the Western Union Telegraph Company. According to Will Bagley, "The bill authorized an annual loan of forty thousand dollars for ten years, a maximum fee of three dollars for a single dispatch of ten words, and the use of a quarter-section of public land for every fifteen miles of line to subsidize the building of a telegraph line west of the state of Missouri to San Francisco, with a branch line to Oregon. The contractors could select any route they pleased."

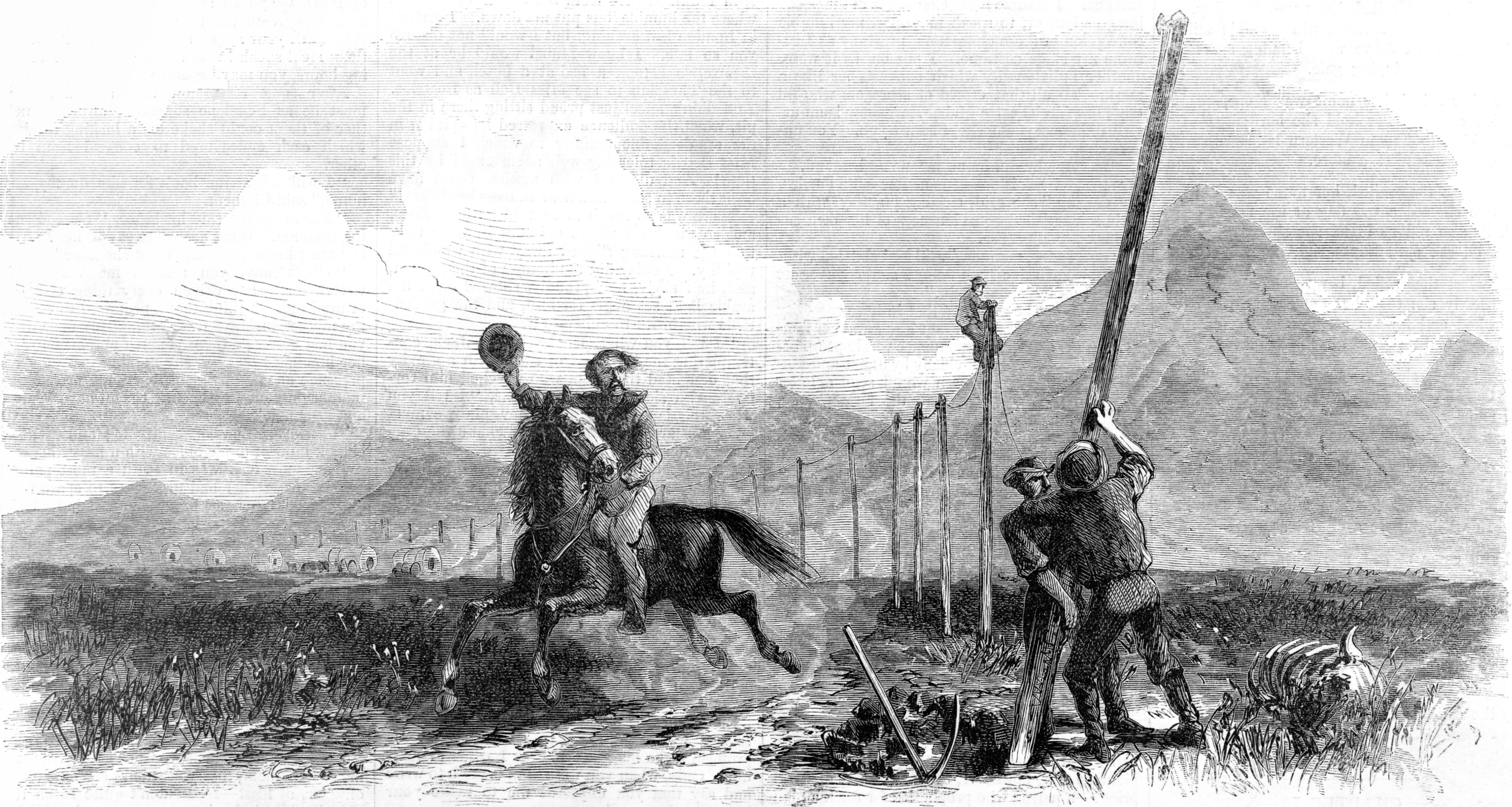
Depiction of the construction of the first Transcontinental Telegraph, with a Pony Express rider passing below.

== External links and sources ==
- Central Pacific Railroad Photographic History Museum: Pacific Telegraph Act of 1860
- History of the first transcontinental telegraph
