= Texas Ranch House =

- Genre: Historical reality television
- Narrated by: Randy Quaid
- Country of origin: United States
- No. of seasons: 1
- No. of episodes: 8

Production
- Running time: 60 min.

Original release
- Network: Channel 4/PBS
- Release: May 1 – May 4, 2006

Texas Ranch House is an PBS American reality television series that premiered in May 2006. Produced by Thirteen/WNET New York, Wall to Wall Media Limited, and PBS, the show placed fifteen modern day people in the context of 1867 Texas. Show participants attempted to run a ranch for two and a half months using 19th century tools and techniques.

A historian Alwyn Barr, a professor emeritus at Texas Tech University in Lubbock, was a consultant to the program.

== Participants ==
=== Cookes ===
- Bill Cooke – Ranch owner, a California businessman, husband of Lisa, father of Vienna, Lacey, and Hannah
- Lisa Cooke – Ranch owner's wife, homemaker wife of Bill and mother of Vienna, Lacey, and Hannah
- Vienna Cooke, 19 – eldest daughter of Bill and Lisa
- Lacey Cooke, 17 – middle daughter of Bill and Lisa
- Hannah Cooke, 14 – youngest daughter of Bill and Lisa
- Maura Finkelstein – Girl of All Work. She initially is the Cooke's maidservant, but turns into a ranch hand in Episodes 7–8. She becomes the wrangler of the cattle drive, from Maryland

=== Cowboys and cooks ===
- Stan "Colonel" Johnston – Ranch foreman (episodes 1–2)
- Ignacio (Nacho) Quiles – Cook, from New York (episodes 1–3)
- Ian Roberts – Ranch Hand, from Arizona (episodes 1–4); he walked out and in episode 8 was fired
- Robby Cabezuela – Ranch hand/"top hand" in Episode 1 and Ranch Foreman from episodes 2–8, from Texas
- Shaun Terhune – Ranch hand from Episode 1–3 turned Cook in Episodes 3–8, from Vermont
- Johnny Ferguson – Ranch hand, from England
- Anders Heintz – Ranch hand, he supervises Maura during the cattle drive, originally from Sweden. He is one of the five ranch hands that walked out in Episode 8 after the firing of Jared.
- Rob Wright – Ranch hand, who arrived at the Ranch right after Mr. Cooke's speech in Episode 5. (episodes 5–8)
- Jared Ficklin – Ranch hand, from Texas. He was fired in Episode 8 due to Mr. Cooke insistence that he owned the horse that Jared bought previously that Mr. Cooke paid the Camanche for four horses. Jared is a descendant of Ben Ficklin, general manager of the original Pony Express and namesake of the ghost town of Ben Ficklin, Texas.

== Episodes ==
1. "A Home on the Range" – The series opens with the vaqueros, or cowboys, arriving at their new 1867 living quarters, the bunkhouse, and meeting the ranch family (the Cookes) for the first time. As the vaqueros get acclimated to the taxing manual labor of ranch life, digging postholes and hammering fencing, they meet their foreman, Stan, nicknamed "The Colonel," and begin to understand the difficult tasks ahead of them.
2. "The Good, the Bad & the Colonel" – The cowboys travel farther out on the range and slowly begin to gather cows, while back at the ranch, Mrs. Cooke, her three daughters, and family servant Maura begin to understand the drudgery of domestic life. Rising tensions among the group at large lead to various confrontations, including the firing of foreman Stan, but relief comes with a Fourth of July celebration that brings friends and neighbors to the ranch and gives everyone a chance to blow off some steam.
3. "The Cookie Crumbles" – The cowboys awake to discover that 10 horses were stolen from the ranch overnight. Although they manage to retrieve five, they're still short five horses—ones that they'll need for the cattle drive. Meals become a focal point of interaction between the vaqueros and the Cookes—first a mysterious stomach ailment brings the ranch to a grinding halt, ranch cook Nacho is fired, and finally, the food shortage reaches a critical point.
4. "The Great Divide" – Having only claimed one quarter of the required cattle so far, the viability of the Cooke Ranch is in question. The vaqueros' bunkhouse welcomes cowboy Shaun as the new cook, and a freighter finally arrives with food and mail. A visit from U.S. Army soldiers delivers promising news for Mr. Cooke—the U.S. Army will be buying cattle in the weeks ahead, providing him with a much-needed buyer. During this episode, Ian receives a letter stating that a close friend had died in a motorcycle accident, and leaves the show as a result.
5. "Showdown at the Cooke Corral" – Mr. Cooke delivers a surprising midway assessment of the cowboys' performance, while a new cowhand arrives, throwing another personality into the mix. Mr. Cooke also sends "girl of all work" Maura off to cowboy training, but his revelation that she will be joining the upcoming cattle drive angers the vaqueros.
6. "Lords of the Plains" – A run-in with a camp of Comanche Native Americans and the spotting of several stolen horses leads to one vaquero being held captive and negotiations between Mr. Cooke and the Comanche leader. The birth of five baby goats excites the Cooke girls, who find themselves nursing the runt rejected by its mother, while Maura and new foreman Robby come to an agreement about her role as a cowhand.
7. "Blazing Trails" – After a final round-up, 131 head are culled from the herd for the big cattle drive, the rest held back to re-stock the ranch. After spending 12 solid hours in the saddle on their first day of the drive, the cowboys' spirits flag at the prospect of eight more days on the trail. Robby and his men have a confrontation with an ornery steer that teaches them just how dangerous cowboy work can be. Back at the ranch, the Cooke women are dealing with a massive fly infestation that is driving them nearly insane.
8. "The Reckoning" – It's nearly the end of the drive and Ft. Santiago, the cowboys' destination, is in sight. After nine days on the trail the vaqueros count and deliver their herd to the army, but the buying agent's offer shocks Mr. Cooke. Overall the drive is a success, but tensions finally boil over upon the group's return to the ranch. The episode concludes with the assessment team reviewing the performance of all the participants and answering the ultimate question: would the ranch have survived another year?

== See also ==
- Colonial House (TV series)
- Frontier House
