= Maura Finkelstein =

American anthropologist

- Born: 1979 or 1980 (age 45–46)

Academic background
- Education: Columbia University (MA); Stanford University (PhD)

Academic work
- Discipline: Anthropology
- Sub-discipline: Urban India
- Institutions: Muhlenberg College (2015–2024)
- Notable works: The Archive of Loss (2019)
- Website: www.maurafinkelstein.com

Maura Finkelstein is an anthropologist thought to be the first tenured professor to lose their job for pro-Palestine speech in the United States. After completing her PhD in cultural anthropology at Stanford, she became a professor at Muhlenberg College, receiving tenure in 2021. Specializing in urban India, she wrote The Archive of Loss: Lively Ruination in Mill Land Mumbai (2019), an ethnography of Mumbai mill workers. In 2024, Finkelstein was fired after Muhlenberg determined that she had violated their anti-discrimination policy by sharing a post by Remi Kanazi on her Instagram story that stated: "Do not cower to Zionists. Shame them. Do not welcome them in your spaces." Finkelstein's firing was criticized by the American Association of University Professors (AAUP) as a violation of her academic freedom. Finkelstein participated in Texas Ranch House (2006), a PBS reality TV show about life in 1867 rural Texas.

== Early life and education ==
Born around 1980, Finkelstein was raised in Chevy Chase, Maryland. In her final year of high school, she learned about the Israeli-Palestinian conflict and eventually began identifying as anti-Zionist. She is queer, Jewish, and an equestrian.

== Career ==
=== Texas Ranch House ===
After completing her master's degree, Finkelstein participated in a PBS reality TV show called Texas Ranch House (2006). The participants spent three summer months on a remote ranch in the Chihuahuan Desert in conditions designed to mimic life in 1867. They dealt with cattle rustlers, food shortages, rudimentary tools, extreme weather, and other harsh living conditions. Participants included a family of five from California, cowboys, and other staff. A common theme of the show is conflict regarding gender roles. Finkelstein criticized her male co-stars for having sexist attitudes. Disappointed to be cast as a maid, Finkelstein successfully lobbied to be a ranch hand, citing historical examples of female cowboys. In 2023, Finkelstein reported that she was working on a memoir about her experiences on the show.

=== Academic career ===
Finkelstein obtained her master's degree in anthropology from Columbia University and her PhD in cultural anthropology from Stanford. She worked for two years at Mills College before starting a position at Muhlenberg College in 2015. There she taught about urban India as well as Palestine and achieved tenure in 2021. In 2024, she became an associate editor for the American Anthropologist.

Duke University Press published Finkelstein's The Archive of Loss: Lively Ruination in Mill Land Mumbai in 2019. The book is an ethnography of Dhanraj Spinning and Weaving, a textile mill in Mumbai. Finkelstein draws on several years of her field research to describe the mill's workers in the context of deindustrialization, including the impact of their labor on their bodies, their residences in the Bombay Development Department (BDD) chawls, and their differing perspectives of the 1982 Great Bombay textile strike. A review in Anthropological Quarterly stated that Finkelstein: "delicately and patiently unearths how these deteriorating spaces and bodies remain lively while also sustaining other, post-industrial activities around them". Other reviewers like Hans Schenk praised the book as innovative but questioned Finkelstein's methodology of basing her argument on the accounts of only 5 workers.

=== Gaza war ===
Vocal about her pro-Palestine views, Finkelstein visited Palestine in 2018 and had a sign on her office door that said "Long live Palestine" in Arabic. Soon after the October 7 attacks, Finkelstein held class discussions based on student questions, including questions about Hamas. After a student alleged that Finkelstein had made pro-Hamas remarks, Finkelstein told the Muhlenberg administration that she would not talk about the Gaza war in her classes anymore. In late October, a group of anonymous school alumni started a petition advocating for Finkelstein's dismissal due to her social media posts. For example, the petition highlighted a post in which she said that a student fundraiser for "the various war efforts in Israel" was "raising money for genocide" and called for a ceasefire. Another post featured a photo of Finkelstein wearing a keffiyeh and a shirt that said: "Anti-Zionist Vibes Only." The petition accrued more than 8,000 signatures. According to Finkelstein, she received anonymous threats, including rape threats.

In January 2024, Muhlenberg informed Finkelstein that the school was being investigated for discrimination by the US Department of Education, most likely because of her. That evening, Finkelstein shared a post by Remi Kanazi to her Instagram stories. The post stated: “Do not cower to Zionists. Shame them. Do not welcome them in your spaces. Do not make them feel comfortable. Why should those genocide-loving fascists be treated any different than any other flat-out racist. Don’t normalize Zionism. Don’t normalize Zionists taking up space.” A student filed a complaint about the post, and Finkelstein was put on leave shortly thereafter.

An independent investigation found that Finkelstein's Instagram post was not harassment but might be considered discrimination. It also criticized the way that the student complaint was initiated: a Muhlenberg dean had shared the Instagram post with the school's Hillel director. The director asked one of the Hillel fellows to find a student to file a complaint. A student who had never met Finkelstein or taken one of her classes then filed a complaint about the post. After the investigation concluded, Muhlenberg fired Finkelstein in May 2024, stating that the Instagram post had violated their anti-discrimination policy. Finkelstein appealed the decision. In July, the email accounts of Muhlenberg administrators and local politicians were spammed with hundreds of e-mails in one day calling for Finkelstein's dismissal for anti-semitism. In September, Finkelstein was informed that her appeal had been denied, and she publicly announced that she had been fired. Soon afterwards, the Department of Education finished its investigation, concluding that Muhlenberg had inadequately investigated student complaints against Finkelstein by failing to determine if she had created a hostile environment for Jewish students.

Both the American Association of University Professors (AAUP) and a panel of Muhlenberg faculty found that Muhlenberg had violated Finkelstein's academic freedom, a claim the college has disputed. According to The Intercept and several academic freedom advocacy groups, Finkelstein is the first tenured professor to lose their position for criticizing Israel. She has been compared to Steven Salaita, a Palestinian-American professor whose offer of tenure was withdrawn for pro-Palestine speech. Finkelstein has also been contrasted with Amy Wax, an American professor who was temporarily suspended but ultimately kept her job after making statements described by her dean as racist. Finkelstein has given multiple talks entitled: “Academic Freedom in Times of Crisis.”

== Selected publications ==
- "Landscapes of Invisibility: Anachronistic Subjects and Allochronous Spaces in Mill Land Mumbai". City & Society. vol. 27 no. 3, 2016.
- "Ghosts in the Gallery: The Vitality of Anachronism in a Mumbai Chawl". Anthropological Quarterly. vol. 91 no. 3, 2018.
- The Archive of Loss: Lively Ruination in Mill Land Mumbai. Durham: Duke University Press, 2019.
- "Reframing Hamas". Allegra Lab. December 2023.
- "Work Cannot Save Us but Let's Still Try: Labor, Utopias, and Futurity at an Equine Therapy Farm". Anthropology of Work Review. 2025.
- "Where language does not live". American Anthropologist, vol. 127 no. 1, 2025.

== See also ==
- Steven Salaita hiring controversy
