= Israel on Campus Coalition =

American pro-Israel umbrella organization

- Abbreviation: ICC
- Formation: 2002
- Type: 501(c)(3) organization
- Tax ID no.: 30-0664947
- Headquarters: Washington, D.C.
- Location: Nationwide
- Region served: United States
- CEO: Jacob Baime
- Key people: Dorothy Tananbaum, Board Chair
- Main organ: convenor of national pro-Israel organizations
- Website: israelcc.org

The Israel on Campus Coalition (ICC) is a United States pro-Israel umbrella organization founded in 2002 with funding from the Charles and Lynn Schusterman Family Philanthropies and Hillel: The Foundation for Jewish Campus Life. ICC's chief executive officer since 2013, Jacob Baime, is a former national field director for AIPAC.

== History ==
ICC coordinates groups and students to respond to perceived anti-Israel activism.

The ICC collects and publishes data on the Boycott, Divestment and Sanctions (BDS) movement. It publishes an annual campus trends report on this topic. According to promotional material distributed to potential donors ICC monitors progressive Jewish student groups.

In 2016, ICC campaigned against Palestinian-American poet Remi Kanazi by secretly funding Facebook pages that appeared under the names of fake student organizations. Asked in 2018 about the pages, Facebook removed them for violating their "policies against misrepresentation".

In November 2018, undercover footage from the censored Al Jazeera Documentary The Lobby USA revealed extensive conversations between ICC executives and Al Jazeera's undercover reporter. An ICC executive admits the organization "coordinates" and "communicates" with Israel's Ministry of Strategic Affairs. The footage also revealed the ICC includes the Ministry of Strategic Affairs on the organizations “operations and intelligence brief.” Despite the admission that Israel on Campus Coalition coordinates with the Ministry of Strategic Affairs, an Israeli government ministry, records show the ICC is not registered under the Foreign Agent Registration Act.

Al Jazeera reported on surveillance campaigns conducted by the Israel on Campus Coalition that the organization claims are directed towards pro-Palestine and BDS advocates, describing the organization's surveillance efforts as a method of psychological warfare through undercover footage. The film ultimately reveals the ICC coordinates closely with and may operate Canary Mission. The organization previously received criticism from progressive Jewish student organization Open Hillel, after the ICC recognized the Canary Mission blacklist "for deterring BDS activism and causing students to drop their support for pro-Palestine groups out of fear of repercussions."

In October 2023, the organization led petitions to multiple universities to withdraw recognition of and funding for Students for Justice in Palestine. That same month, the organization sponsored a concert by musician Matisyahu on Columbia University's campus. In November 2023, the ICC reimbursed thousands of pro-Israel college students up to $250 per person to travel to the November 14, 2023 March for Israel rally in Washington D.C., funded through its microgrant program.

The Nation reported in 2023 that the ICC has ties to Israeli intelligence and AIPAC. It gathers information on pro-Palestinian students and groups in the US, including through the use of student informants in Jewish and pro-Israel student organizations, to pass on to the Israeli Ministry of Strategic Affairs.

== See also ==
- Gaza war protests in the United States
- Israel lobby in the United States
- Public diplomacy of Israel
