= Overland Telegraph Company =

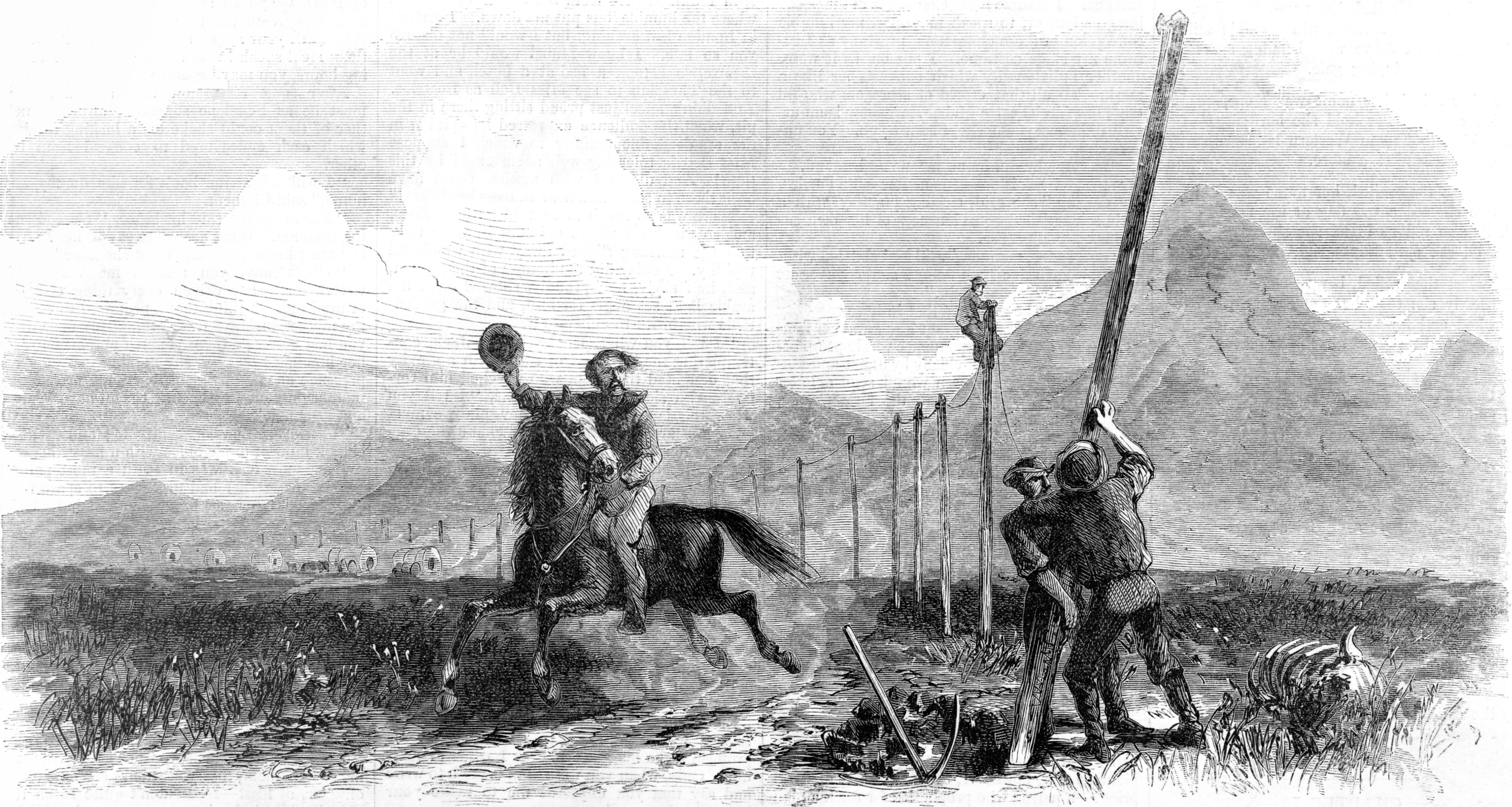
Wood engraving in Harper's Weekly, depicting the construction of the first Transcontinental Telegraph, with a Pony Express rider passing below.

The Overland Telegraph Company was one of the organizations responsible for constructing the telegraph line which resulted in the first transcontinental telegraph network in the United States. The company built the section of line between Fort Churchill, Nevada Territory (where it connected to existing telegraph networks in California) and Salt Lake City, Utah Territory.

The first messages between California and the Utah Territory were sent via the new line on the evening of October 24, 1861, completing the transcontinental network. (The section of line between the eastern United States and Salt Lake City had been completed by the Pacific Telegraph Company a few days prior.) Soon after the line's completion, the Overland Telegraph Company was absorbed into the California State Telegraph Company, which itself became a part of the Western Union Telegraph Company in 1867.

== History ==
=== Organization ===
The Pacific Telegraph Act of 1860 called for the facilitation of telegraphic communication between the east and west coasts of the United States. A contract for construction of the telegraph line, as authorized by the act, was awarded to Hiram Sibley of the Western Union Telegraph Company. Sibley and the Western Union would organize (and receive help from) other telegraph companies to build the line.

The California State Telegraph Company had recently consolidated all the existing telegraph companies in California, and was tasked with building the section of transcontinental telegraph line from their existing infrastructure in California and Nevada Territory towards Salt Lake City (where it would meet the line being constructed by the Pacific Telegraph Company). To oversee the construction, the California State Telegraph Company's interests incorporated the Overland Telegraph Company in April 1861. The following month, the Overland Telegraph Company was officially organized with Horace W. Carpentier as president, James Gamble as Superintendent and James Street as General Agent.

=== Construction and operation ===
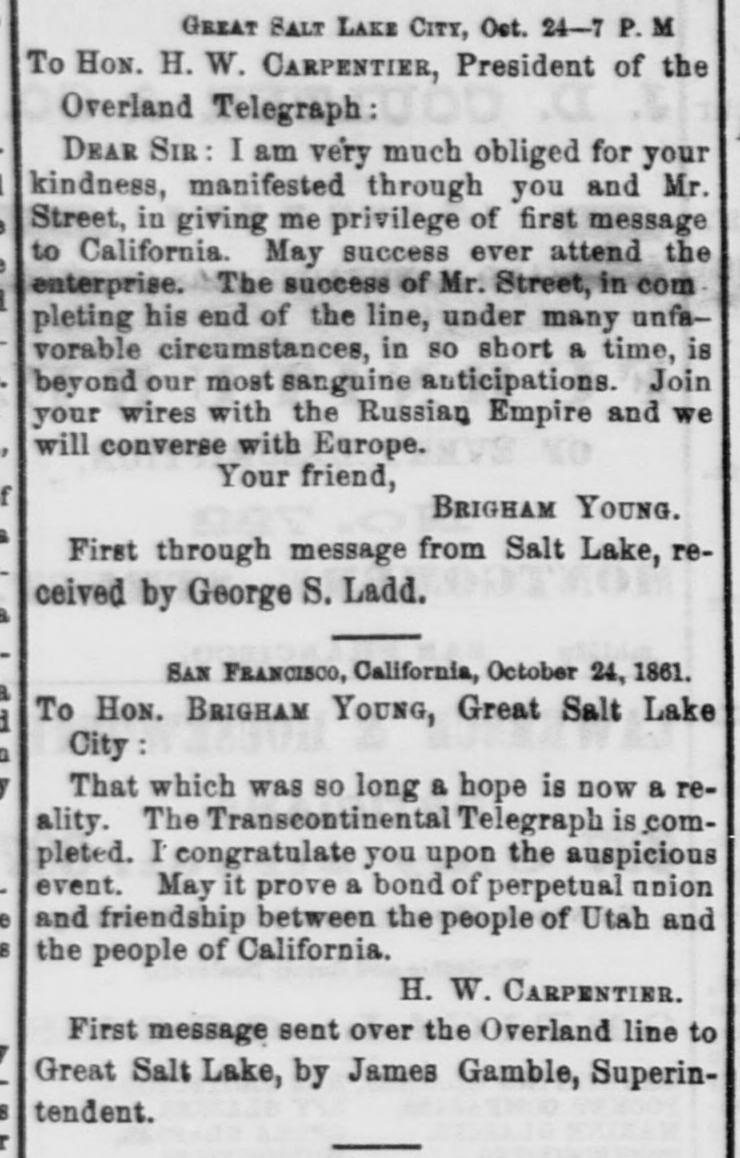
First messages sent between Utah Territory and California, as published by The Daily Alta California October 25, 1861.

Construction started on June 20, 1861 at Fort Churchill and simultaneously from Salt Lake in July. James Gamble—who was managing the work—wrote, "The line was first measured and staked off; the hole-diggers followed; then came the pole-setters, and next the wire party." Between three and eight miles of line were strung per day. The older telegraph line (originally built by the Placerville and Humboldt Telegraph Company) between Placerville, California and Fort Churchill was also replaced.

Once the line had been completed to Salt Lake City, the first messages were sent on the evening of October 24, 1861. At 5:13 pm (Salt Lake City time), James Street sent the first message to California from Utah Territory. It was addressed to company president Horace Carpentier, advising him the line was complete and to go to the nearby telegraph office. Less than two hours later, Brigham Young, President of the Church of Jesus Christ of Latter-day Saints, sent the next message. Also addressed to Carpentier, this congratulatory message received a response, resulting in the first back-and-forth communication between San Francisco and Salt Lake City. Shortly thereafter, a message was forwarded to San Francisco informing them that Colonel Edward D. Baker—a former politician in California—had been killed at the Battle of Ball's Bluff a few days prior. News of this event put a damper on the celebrations surrounding the telegraph's completion. Later that evening, messages were also sent from California to Abraham Lincoln, President of the United States at the time.

The transcontinental telegraph led to the immediate demise of the Pony Express.

=== Acquisition ===
The Overland Telegraph Company was absorbed into the California State Telegraph Company in November 1861, (as the officers of the two companies were the same, it was said the companies were "substantially the same concern"). In 1866, the Western Union Telegraph Company acquired a controlling interest in California State Telegraph Company. Then, in May 1867, the California State Telegraph Company ceased operating with the public and its lines became part of Western Union's Pacific Division.
