= Huang Zunxian =

Qing scholar-official (1848–1905)

- 黃遵憲
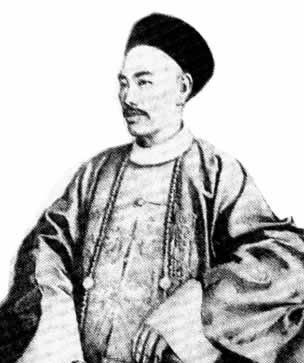

Chinese Ambassador to Japan
- In office August 11, 1898 – October 5, 1898
- Preceded by: Yu Geng
- Succeeded by: Li Shengduo

Personal details
- Born: May 29, 1848 Jiayingzhou (now Mei County, Guangdong)
- Died: May 28, 1905 (aged 56) Jiayingzhou
- Occupation: Chinese official, scholar, and writer

Chinese name
- Traditional Chinese: 黃遵憲
- Simplified Chinese: 黄遵宪
Transcriptions
Standard Mandarin
- Hanyu Pinyin: Huáng Zūnxiàn
- Wade–Giles: Huang Tsun-hsien
Yue: Cantonese
- Jyutping: Wong4 Zeon1 Hin3

Courtesy name
- Chinese: 公度
Transcriptions
Standard Mandarin
- Hanyu Pinyin: Gōngdù
Yue: Cantonese
- Jyutping: Gung1 Dou6

Art name
- Traditional Chinese: 人境廬主人
- Simplified Chinese: 人境庐主人
Transcriptions
Standard Mandarin
- Hanyu Pinyin: Rénjìnglú Zhǔrén
Yue: Cantonese
- Jyutping: Jan4 ging2 lou4 Zyu2 jan2

Huang Zunxian (Chinese: 黃遵憲, May 29, 1848 – March 28, 1905), courtesy name Gongdu (公度), was a Chinese official, scholar, and writer, active during the late Qing dynasty. As a poet, he published more than a hundred poems. He was born in Jiayingzhou, now Mei County, Guangdong, and died 57 years later in the same place. His important contributions to China made him a recognised figure of his time, and a namesake foundation has been established in his honour. Huang's former residence is now marked as a public museum.

== Early life and career ==
Huang was born May 29, 1848, in Jiayingzhou (now Mei County), Guangdong, China to a family of Hakka heritage. His father Huang Hung Chow was a scholar-official (Juren) and served the courts of the Qing dynasty. At age three, he witnessed the effects of the greatest land reforms in China. As a toddler, the younger Huang could recite the famous Chinese anthology Thousand Families Poems (千家詩) and as a nine-year-old child studied poems from the Tang dynasty. His life took a turn a few years later, during the Taiping Rebellion, when he was robbed of many of his possessions. He applied to be a Juren, like his father, when he became of age in 1877. Despite heavy competition, he found success and was posted to Tokyo, Japan to serve as the Imperial Chinese Embassy's Counsellor. In September 1880, he published Korea Strategy, a paper regarding the high level plans of Korea (unified as it then was). Huang suggested that China and Korea become good allies. The work is described by one source as "a work of destiny that determined the modern history of East Asia". While in Japan, he did some editorial work for the Japan World Magazine, looked into aspects of the medicine of the country, and noted how much the country had progressed through time and published his studies in a book, Treatises on Japan (printed 1890). The Guangxu Emperor was fascinated with the work and invited Huang to detailedly explain it to him in person. It was partially because of Huang's book that the Guangxu Emperor amended some rules in China. Huang is also considered to be a philosopher, having analysed, discussed, and questioned the framework of China. His influences in philosophy included the Enlightenment figures Rousseau and Montesquieu.

Afterwards in 1882, Huang was assigned as Consul-General in San Francisco, United States. During his time there, he realised how wealthy the immigrant Chinese had become, and how much of an asset they were to China. Huang wrote a poem about Frederick Bee, an official at the Chinese Consulate. After seven years in the United States, he moved back to his home country China. In 1890, he relocated to London to act as the Counsellor of the Chinese Embassy; one year later he was reassigned to Singapore to become the Consul-General there. He witnessed how similar the Singaporean Chinese, both rich and generous, were to the native Chinese. Disagreeing with China's policy of not allowing overseas Chinese to return to the country, and torturing them if they did so, Huang composed a formal request to the Emperor to do away with the rule, offering the view that China was "driv[ing] fish into other people's nets". The request was accepted and on January 29, 1894, it was announced that the Chinese overseas were no longer barred from returning to China. In between, Huang was Hunan Province's Salt Intendant and he started the Journal for Contemporary Affairs. The change of policy was widely celebrated and reported; Huang was soon to be appointed China's ambassador to Japan. However, before that could materialize, Empress Dowager Cixi seized power and ended the Hundred Days' Reform. With the Guangxu Emperor detained, Huang's career as a diplomat was over. He slammed Empress Dowager Cixi's coup but at the same time expressed his relief at being freed of his diplomatic duties.

== Personal life ==
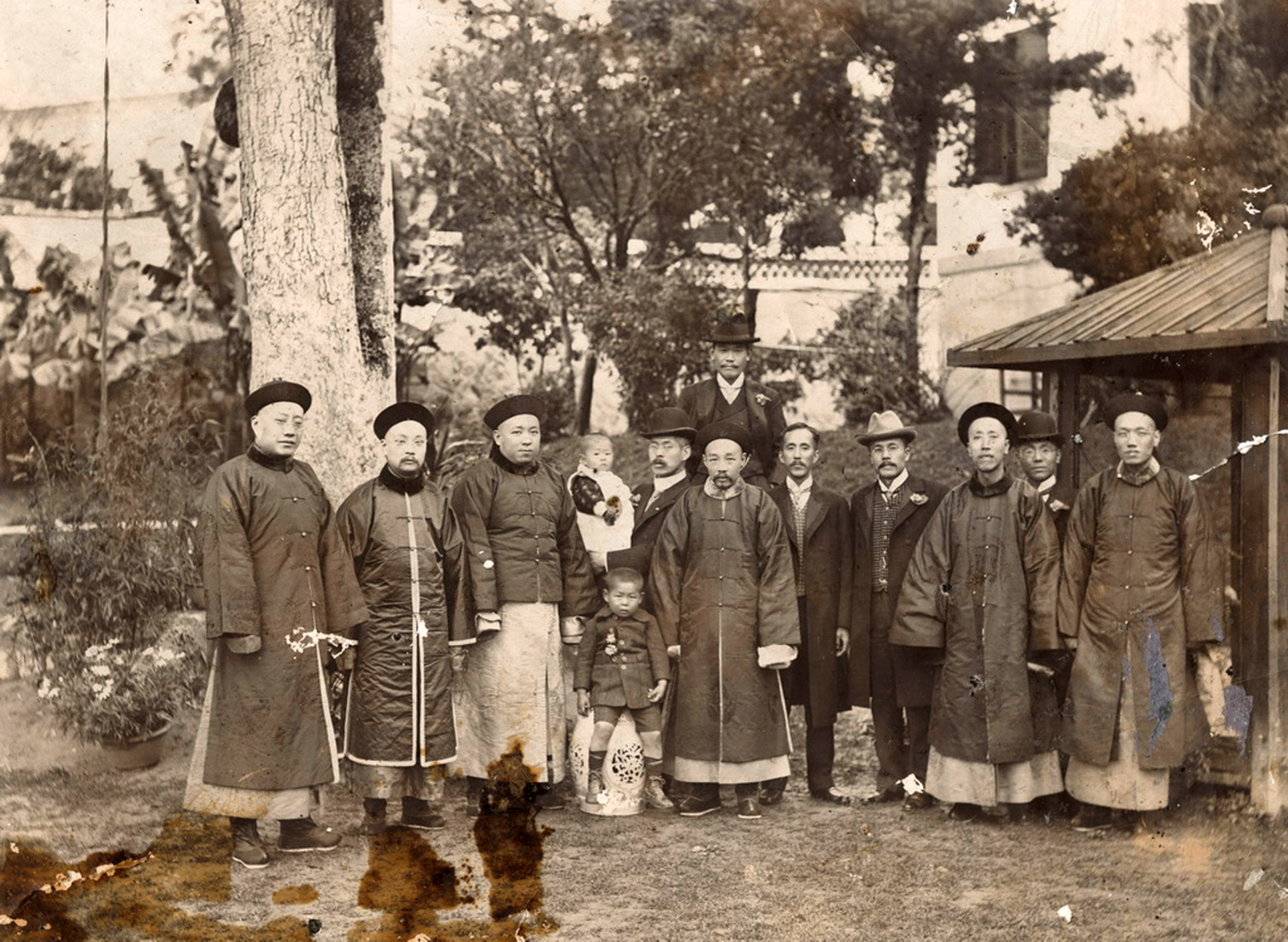
Huang (pictured in direct middle of front row) with family members, circa 1900

Huang had thoughts regarding race. As a teenager he expressed that every person "is made from yellow clay". Decades later he asked, "Why is the yellow race not the only race in the world?" Huang enjoyed composing poetry. He was also patriotic towards China, and once described it as a gold-paved nation. He was well-liked as a poet and his poetical works received positive criticism, with one source citing him as "the most distinguished poet among the late nineteenth-century reformers". His influences in poetry included Wei Yuan, Gong Zizhen, and Jin He. His grandmother was Lady Li, whose death when Huang was still a child supposedly put him in "deep sorrow", as evidenced in a poem pertaining to Li's tomb. Most of Huang's poems relate to world affairs of his time, including foreign ones, such as the presidential elections in the United States. In total, he published more than a hundred poems. After he died, an anthology of his poems, Poems of the Human Environment (人境廬詩草), was published and remains popular in China. A proponent of the late Qing Poetic Revolution, select poems of his include: The Mountain Song, The Cherry Blossom Festival, The Fog of London, Songs of the Taiping Rebels, On The Road to Wuqing, and Expelling the Visitor. In his lifetime, he also showed an interest in opening schools in various countries in Asia. Huang and Liang Qichao were close friends. Huang extensively toured many parts of Asia, his favourite being Malaysia. His nephew, Parkcane C. Hwang, was the founder and manager of the Bank of China in Singapore.

== Death and legacy ==
Evading arrest following the change of ruler of China, Huang fled to his hometown of Jiayingzhou, where he died on March 28, 1905, aged 58. Huang is remembered for saying the famous and often-quoted line when he was twenty years old, "我手寫我口，古豈能拘牽！", which roughly means that it is perfectly fine to express one's feelings whenever one feels like it. Huang is credited as the "first Chinese to use the word 文明 to mean civilisation", a term which he made use of in one of his poems. His body is as of 2013 missing, having been thrown into a dumpster following the looting of his tomb. The Huang Zun Xian Foundation, based in Hong Kong, has listed finding the body of Huang as one of its missions. One source credits Huang as "the first Chinese diplomat and scholar who championed for human rights for the early Chinese migrants", whilst another exalts him as "one of the most famous authors of late nineteenth-century China". An exhibition honoring the achievements of Huang was held in January 1991. It featured artistic depictions of him by some 130 various artists. Huang's former abode in Mei County has been converted into a museum and a local government-promoted tourist destination. It is cited as a "key preservation unit of cultural relic" and an exemplification of the "beauty of the Lingnan-style garden".

== See also ==
- Liang Qichao
- Tan Sitong
- Kang Youwei
- Zhang Zhidong

== Bibliography ==
- Lee, Khoon Choy (2013). Golden Dragon and Purple Phoenix: The Chinese and Their Multi-Ethnic Descendants in Southeast Asia. World Scientific. ISBN 978-981-4383-43-1.
- Schmidt, J. D. (September 6, 2007). Within the Human Realm: The Poetry of Huang Zunxian, 1848–1905. Cambridge University Press. ISBN 978-0-521-03666-5.
- 徐永端 [Xu Yongduan] (1989). 黄遵宪 [Huang Zunxian] (in Chinese). 上海古籍出版社 [Shanghai Historical Collection Publishing]. ISBN 9787532505692.
- "Huang Zunxian yanjiu xinlun 黄遵宪研究新论" [New Research on Huang Zunxian]. Jinian Huang Zunxian shishi yibainian guoji xueshu taolunhui lunwenji 纪念黄遵宪逝世一百周年国际学术讨论会论文集 [Collected Papers of the International Scholarly Conference Commemorating the Hundredth Anniversary of Huang Zunxian's Death]. Social Sciences Literature Press [Scientific Society Publishing]. 2007. ISBN 978-7-80230-579-3.
- 黄遵宪 [Huang Zunxian] (2008). 黄遵宪诗选 [Select poems by Huang Zunxian]. Zhonghua Book Company. ISBN 978-7-101-05916-8.
- Hummel, Arthur W. Sr., ed. (1943). "Huang Tsun-hsien" . Eminent Chinese of the Ch'ing Period. United States Government Printing Office.
