= Security Trust Company of Rochester =

- Industry: Banking
- Founded: 1892; 134 years ago
- Defunct: 1983; 43 years ago
- Fate: Acquired by Norstar Bancorp
- Headquarters: Rochester, New York

Security Trust Company of Rochester was a bank headquartered in Rochester, New York. In 1983, the bank was acquired by Norstar Bank, which was acquired by FleetBoston Financial, which was in turn acquired by Bank of America.

The bank managed trusts for some of the wealthiest individuals in Rochester, including George Eastman, the founder of Kodak.

== History ==
The bank was formed in 1892.

The first president of the bank was Hiram W. Sibley, whose father, Hiram Sibley, was one of the founders of Western Union.

In 1981, a deadly shootout occurred at a branch of the bank. Also in 1981, Erland E. "Erkie" Kailbourne was named president of the bank.

In late 1983, the bank was acquired by Norstar Bancorp and became Security Norstar Bank. In 1987, the bank was fully integrated into Norstar and dropped the "Security" from its name.

The first headquarters of the bank was demolished and replaced by the Rochester Riverside Convention Center. The second headquarters, a mid-century modern building with a unique crenelated roof on both the tower and connected banking office, still functions as the downtown Bank of America branch. The penthouse now serves as an event space for corporate rentals and private parties.
