= George Chorpenning =

U.S. mail pioneer

George W. Chorpenning Jr. (sometimes spelled 'Chorpening'; 1 June 1820–3 April 1894) was a pioneer in the transportation of mail, freight, and passengers through the arid and undeveloped western regions of nineteenth-century United States. His efforts in the 1850s were vital to the integration of the then-new state of California with the established government and economy east of the Mississippi River.

== Early life ==
Chorpenning was born in Somerset County, Pennsylvania, the son of a county judge. Growing up in Somerset, he established a business in nearby Stoystown, Pennsylvania. In 1850 he traveled to California in search of gold. At the time there was need for reliable mail service between California and the eastern states, most of which was then being transported by steamship via the Isthmus of Panama.

== Utah-California mail contracts ==
=== 1851 Route 5066 ===
He teamed with fellow Pennsylvania entrepreneur Absalom Woodward, and they received a contract in April 1851 from the U.S. Post Office to provide monthly transport of the mail between Sacramento, California and Salt Lake City, the most difficult leg of the first overland mail service. The mails were run once per month in each direction. It was a hard journey over the Sierra Nevada, and 16 days was considered good time.

Captain Woodward, of Indiana County, Pennsylvania, made his first run, from California to Salt Lake City, in the winter of 1851/1852. He (as well as four other men in the party) was killed in an Indian attack at Stone House, Nevada; after that Chorpenning had the contract alone, and initially rode the trips himself. Although he persisted in keeping to his agreement with the Post Office, he saw that the schedule was difficult to meet, and that their chosen route along the California Trail was difficult to follow, especially in winter.

=== 1854 Route 12801 ===
Chorpenning renewed his mail contract in 1854, but switched the route to an all-season road from Salt Lake City southwest to San Diego, California, and from there by ship to San Francisco, California. In 1858 he received a third government contract, this time for twice-monthly service and including stagecoach (passenger) service. By then Chorpenning had learned from Howard Egan about a more direct route from Salt Lake City, around the south end of the Great Salt Lake Desert, and through the mountains of central Nevada to the new towns of Carson City, Nevada and Genoa, Nevada. In 1859 Chorpenning used the eastern half of this route, connecting with the original Humboldt River route at Gravelly Ford, near present-day Beowawe, Nevada. By 1860 the full Central Nevada Route had been surveyed by James H. Simpson and improved by the U.S. Army. Chorpenning built a series of provisioned way stations along the route to allow rapid exchange of mule teams.

Unfortunately Chorpenning also had his mail contract annulled in 1860, largely for political reasons. Companies headed by William Hepburn Russell took over the route, and used Chorpenning's way stations to establish the short-lived Pony Express mail service.

== Later life ==
The Pony Express became obsolete in late 1861 when the first transcontinental telegraph, also using Chorpenning's route and way stations, became operational. Transportation along Chorpenning's central route continued until the first transcontinental railroad was completed in 1869.

Chorpenning returned to the eastern states, where he was commissioned as a Civil War officer for the state of Maryland.

== Claims for government payment ==
He later petitioned the U.S. Government (unsuccessfully) to fully meet their contractual obligations for his mail transport service. Chorpenning collected damages in June 1866 for property losses during his and Absalom Woodward’s contract for Route 5066.

== Obituary ==
George Chorpenning died in New York City in 1894. His hometown newspaper, the Somerset Herald, printed his obituary on 11 April 1894:

-- Death of Major Chorpening --

-- Was the First Man to Carry the Mails Across the Continent --

Major George Chorpening died in the New York Hospital, New York City, last Tuesday morning [3 April 1894]. He was born in Somerset, June 1, 1820. He was the first man to carry the United States mails across the continent.

He was the son of Hon. George Chorpening, an Associate Judge of this county, and spent the years of his boyhood around his father's farm. Afterwards he engaged in business in Stoystown. In the spring of 1850 he went to California. In the following year he established a mail business from Sacramento to Salt Lake City. The mails were carried on horseback and the route was gone over once a month. It was a hard journey of the Sierra Nevada Mountains, and sixteen days was considered good time. Chorpening had a partner, Captain Woodward, of Indiana county, Pa. The first trip the Captain made he was killed by Indians. From that time on Chorpening had the contract alone.

He subsequently had a coach contract from the Missouri River to Placerville, California. This was the road over which Horace Greeley was driven by Hank Monch in one of Chorpening's coaches. Chorpening put the coaches on and laid out the road himself. He built post stations at every twenty miles for relays of horses.

Chorpening organized the First and Second Maryland Infantry in 1861, at the personal request of President Lincoln. He was made Major in the First Regiment and Colonel in the Second. For many years he had been prosecuting a claim against the government on mail contracts amounting to $430,000.

During the years that Chorpening was engaged in running coaches and carrying mails over the plains he was assisted by his brother-in-law, Mr. Irwin Pile, of this place. We believe that Mr. Pile has the distinction of driving the first coach ever driven across the plains to California.

For a number of years following the war Major Chorpening made his summer home in this place [Somerset, Pennsylvania], where he owned one of the handsomest properties in town ... He had not visited Somerset for a number of years prior to his death.

He leaves two sons and two daughters, Mrs. F. A. McGee, of California, Frank G. Chorpening, of Berlin, and George W. Chorpening and Mrs. Johnson, both of New York city. The body was interred in the Cemetery of the Evergreens, Long Island.
