= Ben Ficklin, Texas =

Ghost town in Texas, United States

Coordinates: 31°24′10″N 100°26′24″W

Ben Ficklin (Benficklin), Texas is a ghost town and the former county seat of Tom Green County from 1875 to 1882. It was located 5 miles (8 km) south of Fort Concho on the east bank of the South Concho River.

== History ==
In 1868, Maj. Benjamin F. Ficklin bought from John O. Meusebach 640 acres (2.6 km^{2}) on the South Concho near the spring from which Fort Concho hauled its drinking water. There, Ficklin built headquarters for his San Antonio-El Paso mail line. Francis Corbett Taylor, a close friend of Ficklin's, came from Alabama to take charge of the Concho mail station. After Ficklin's sudden death in Washington, DC, on March 10, 1871, Taylor carried on the prospering stage line. In 1873, with William Stephen Kelly and Charles B. Metcalfe, he laid out a town a mile up the river and named it Ben Ficklin in honor of his friend. Kelly, also from Alabama, built the first house. The post office was established on August 27, 1873, with Henry M. Taylor as postmaster.

Taylor and Kelly were among the commissioners appointed to organize Tom Green County in 1874. In January 1875, they led a successful campaign to make Ben Ficklin the county seat, against the stiff challenge of San Angela (now San Angelo). Taylor had the support of stage line employees, Fort Concho officers, area ranchmen, and the growing numbers of business and professional men, who with their families, had been attracted to the new town. San Angela's saloons, gambling houses, and prostitutes were popular with soldiers, cowboys, and buffalo hunters. Ben Ficklin's first courthouse was donated by Taylor and Sheriff James Spears. An adobe building housed a subscription school, and lots were donated for future church buildings. Three stores and a hotel were soon erected. Around 600 people were living in Ben Ficklin when Taylor died in 1879. A two-story stone courthouse was completed in February 1882.

=== Ben Ficklin flood ===
Heavy rains the night of August 23, 1882, swelled Dove Creek, Spring Creek, the Middle Concho River, and the South Concho River, already high because of a wet summer, out of their banks. Their combined waters roared down on Ben Ficklin at midmorning on August 24, and the town was destroyed. On the flat, only the courthouse, the jail, and two houses remained standing. Up the hill, 15 houses and the schoolhouse remained; 65 people were drowned. County offices and the post office were moved to San Angela, which became the county seat in 1883 with the new name San Angelo. Some survivors moved to Sherwood; others found jobs and free homesites in San Angelo. Two families continued to live at Ben Ficklin, a favorite swimming and picnicking spot, into the new century. The Ben Ficklin cemetery, on a hill overlooking new residences, holds the graves of flood victims and of F. C. Taylor and his wife, reinterred there after the flood dislodged their coffins. The Texas Historical Commission erected a marker at the townsite in 1965.
