= Remi Kanazi =

Palestinian-American performance poet

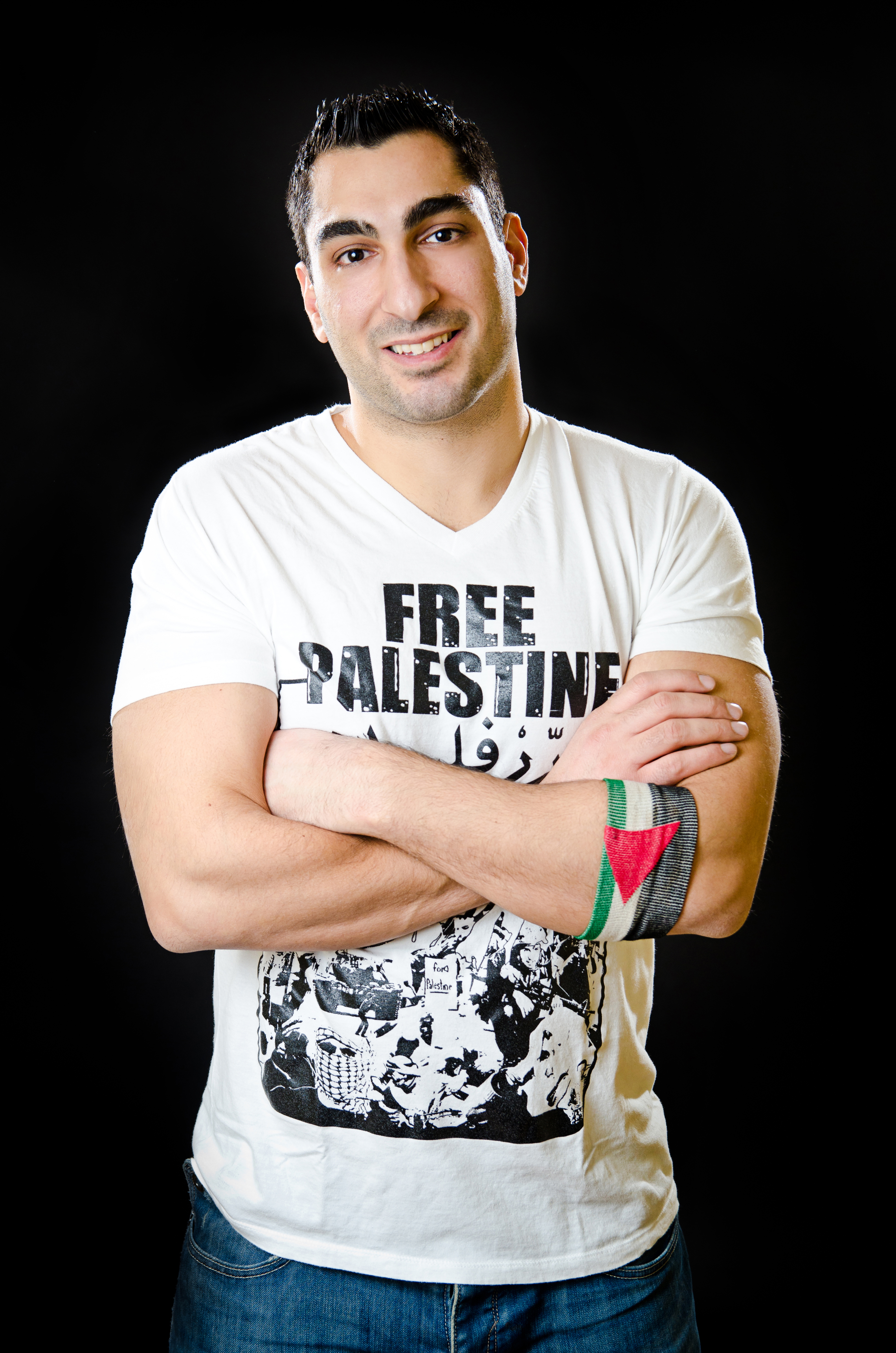
- Remi Kanazi, 2011
- Born: 1981 (age 44–45)
- Writing career
- Language: English
- Genres: Performance poetry, spoken word, hip hop; influenced by hip hop, Def Poetry Jam, Suheir Hammad, Carlos Andres Gomez
- Subjects: Human rights, Palestine, Iraq, Afghanistan, Pakistan
- Website: poeticinjustice.net

Remi Kanazï (born 1981) is a Palestinian-American performance poet, writer and organizer based in New York City. He is the editor of the anthology of hip hop, poetry and art, Poets for Palestine (2008), the author of two collections of poetry, Poetic Injustice: Writings on Resistance and Palestine (2011) and Before the Next Bomb Drops: Rising Up From Brooklyn to Palestine (2015). His political commentary has been featured by news outlets throughout the world, including the New York Times, Salon, Al Jazeera English, and BBC Radio. He has appeared in the Palestine Festival of Literature as well as Poetry International. He is a Lannan Residency Fellow and is on the advisory board of the US Campaign for the Academic and Cultural Boycott of Israel.

== Life and work ==
=== Poetry ===
Inspired by underground hip hop, Def Poetry Jam on Broadway, and the work of artists like Suheir Hammad and Carlos Andres Gomez, Kanazi began writing spoken word. Kanazi writes and performs political poetry addressing topics such as human rights, Palestine, Iraq, and islamophobia. Approaching his work from a humanist perspective, Kanazi says, "This isn’t about me being a Palestinian or me being an Arab. It’s about a system of oppression and what’s being done to a people. So whether you’re talking about police brutality or the US-Mexico border or Afghanistan or the war in Iraq or the plight of Palestinians, what they’re going through and the injustice that’s being perpetrated against them is what matters. And that’s what we’re working against – systems of oppression."

Kanazi is the editor of Poets for Palestine (Al Jisser Group, August 2008), a collection of hip hop, poetry and art featuring Palestinian poets such as Suheir Hammad, Nathalie Handal, Fady Joudah, Annemarie Jacir, Mahmoud Darwish, Naomi Shihab and Kanazi himself, as well as African American poets Patricia Smith and Amiri Baraka. In 2011, Kanazi came out with his first collection, Poetic Injustice: Writings on Resistance and Palestine, a volume of poetry including a CD; he has also been a writer in residence and an advisory board member for the Palestine Writing Workshop, teaching spoken word poetry to youngsters in Palestine. He has appeared on Al Jazeera English and BBC Radio and has toured North America, the UK, and the Middle East, with appearances at the Palestine Festival of Literature and at Poetry International. Kanazi is also on the advisory board of the US Campaign for the Academic and Cultural Boycott of Israel.

== Reception ==
The commentator Chris Hedges has commented positively about Kanazi's poetry, saying, "There is more truth, and perhaps finally more news, in Remi Kanazi's poems than the pages of your daily newspaper." His poetry was similarly praised by the South African former minister Ronnie Kasrils, who considered it "a shining example of tomorrow's Palestine." The novelist and writer John Berger has described Kanazi as "a voice which refuses to be silenced".

Kanazi's political rhetoric has drawn criticism from Jewish sources who have questioned his claims to be pro-peace. He has posted that "Tel Aviv shouldn’t exist. Israel shouldn’t exist" and that "Israel needs to feel more pain. More destruction, more death, afraid in shelters, wondering if this is their last breath. Every moment going forward should be sheer terror until genocide ends and Israeli colonial conquest is disrupted."

== ICC campaign ==
In 2016, when Kanazi was on a tour of campuses promoting his latest book Before the Next Bomb Drops: Rising Up From Brooklyn to Palestine, Israel on Campus Coalition (ICC) ran a covert campaign against him, having professionals setting up Facebook groups pretending to be student-operated. These groups appeared just before Kanazi's meeting at John Jay College of Criminal Justice and San Jose State University.

== Publications ==
- Poets for Palestine (ed.), Al Jisser, 2008, ISBN 978-1-930083-09-7
- Poetic Injustice – Writings on Resistance and Palestine, RoR Publishing, 2011, ISBN 978-0-615-42166-7
- Before the Next Bomb Drops: Rising Up From Brooklyn to Palestine, 2015, ISBN 978-1-608-46524-8
