= James D. Reid =

James Douglas Reid was a Scotsman who became general superintendent of the Magnetic Telegraph Company of which Amos Kendall was president in 1846. The Magnetic line linked Fort Lee to Philadelphia. Among those who incorporated the line was Samuel Morse. Reid was also superintendent of the Lake Erie Telegraph Company, and the Pittsburgh, Cincinnati & Louisville Telegraph Company. He wrote a detailed history of the telegraph industry
