= Jeptha Wade =

American industrialist and philanthropist

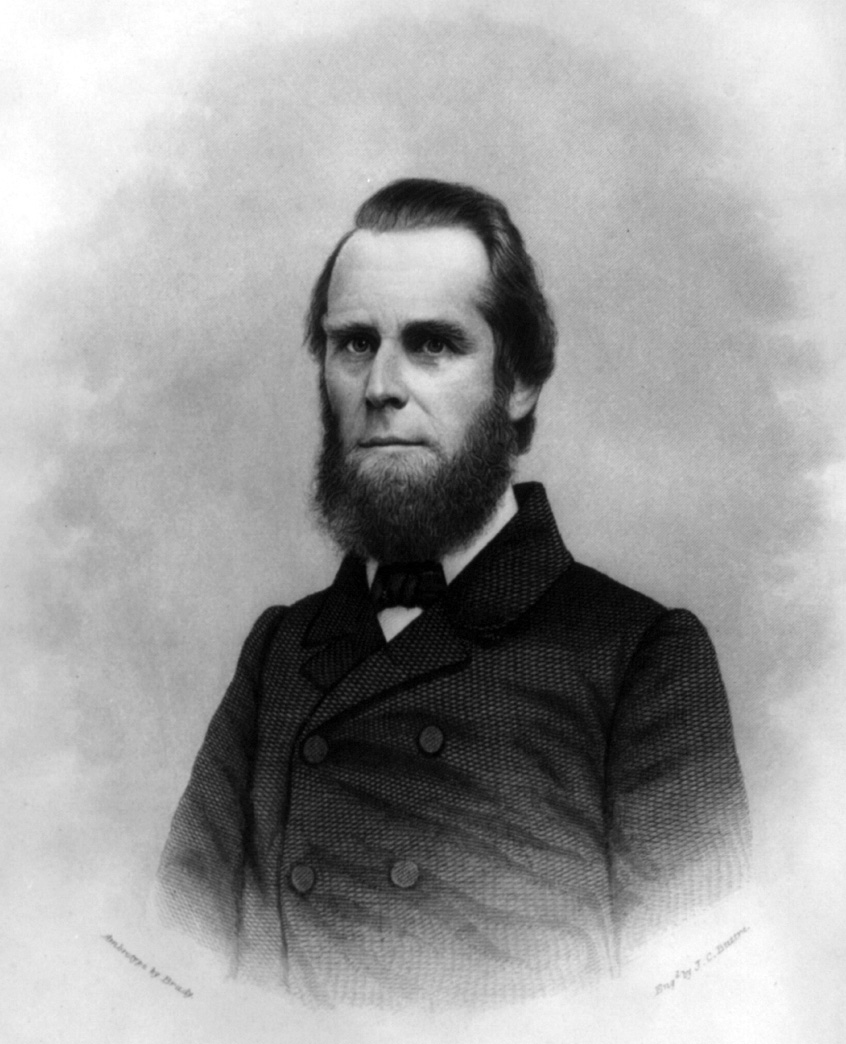
Jeptha Homer Wade

Jeptha Homer Wade (August 11, 1811 – August 9, 1890) was an American industrialist, philanthropist, and one of the founding members of Western Union Telegraph. Wade was born in Romulus, New York, the youngest of nine children of Jeptha and Sarah (Allen) Wade. He made the first Daguerreotypes west of New York, was a portrait painter, and moved to Adrian, Michigan, in 1840 before developing an interest in the telegraph.

== Biography ==
Born in Romulus, New York Jeptha Wade was a member of the Presbyterian Church there, which his father and mother helped found.

In 1847, he was subcontractor for J.J. Speed and constructed a telegraph line from Detroit to Jackson, Michigan, where Wade and his son operated the telegraph office. He also connected Detroit, Michigan, to Buffalo, New York, Cleveland to Cincinnati (Cleveland and Cincinnati Telegraph Company, the Wade Line), and others.

Wade moved to Cleveland, Ohio, in 1856 with his wife and only child, Randall P. Wade (1835–1876). Eventually Randall would supervise the construction of two adjoining mansions with a shared driveway on Cleveland's Euclid Avenue, called Millionaires' Row.

In 1856 Jeptha helped Hiram Sibley consolidate most of the telegraph industry by forming Western Union through a series of acquisitions and mergers. In 1861, Jeptha Wade joined forces with Benjamin Franklin Ficklin and Hiram Sibley to form the Pacific Telegraph Company. The company's formation completed the linkage between the east and west coast of the United States by telegraph. Wade became president of Western Union in 1866. A year later he resigned because of ill-health and sold his interests to Jay Gould, and William Orton succeeded to the presidency of Western Union. Jeptha was nominated by the Democratic Party for Representative of Ohio's 18th congressional district in 1864, but lost. He was an incorporator of the Cleveland Rolling Mill Company and the Citizens Savings and Loan Association (becoming its first president), became president of National Bank of Commerce, and served on the board of directors of eight railroads.

Wade used his vast wealth to benefit the city of Cleveland. Jeptha Wade was a trustee of the Cleveland Protestant Orphan Asylum (now known as Beech Brook) and financed the construction of its new building on Saint Clair Avenue in Cleveland. In 1882, he donated 63 acres (250,000 m^{2}) of land east of the city for the purpose of creating Wade Park, which was named in his honor. Wade Park is Cleveland's cultural center surrounded by the Cleveland Museum of Art, the Cleveland Museum of Natural History, the Western Reserve Historical Society and the Cleveland Botanical Garden. Jeptha Wade partnered with Presbyterian minister Hiram Haydn, along with industrialist Amasa Stone, to create University Circle.

Wade also was heavily involved with the establishment of Hathaway Brown School, a private academy for young girls and women. He also co-founded the Case School of Applied Technology, which later became part of Case Western Reserve University. In addition, Wade served as the first President of the Board of Trustees for Lake View Cemetery on Cleveland's east side.

== Personal life ==
Wade married Rebecca Louiza Facer in 1832, who bore his first son, Randall Palmer Wade, later that year. Rebecca Wade died November 30, 1836, at the age of 24.

He remarried in 1837 to Susan Maranda Fleming, with whom he adopted 4 more children. All are buried in Lake View Cemetery, Cleveland.

Jeptha Wade died suddenly of peritonitis on August 10, 1890.

== Legacy ==
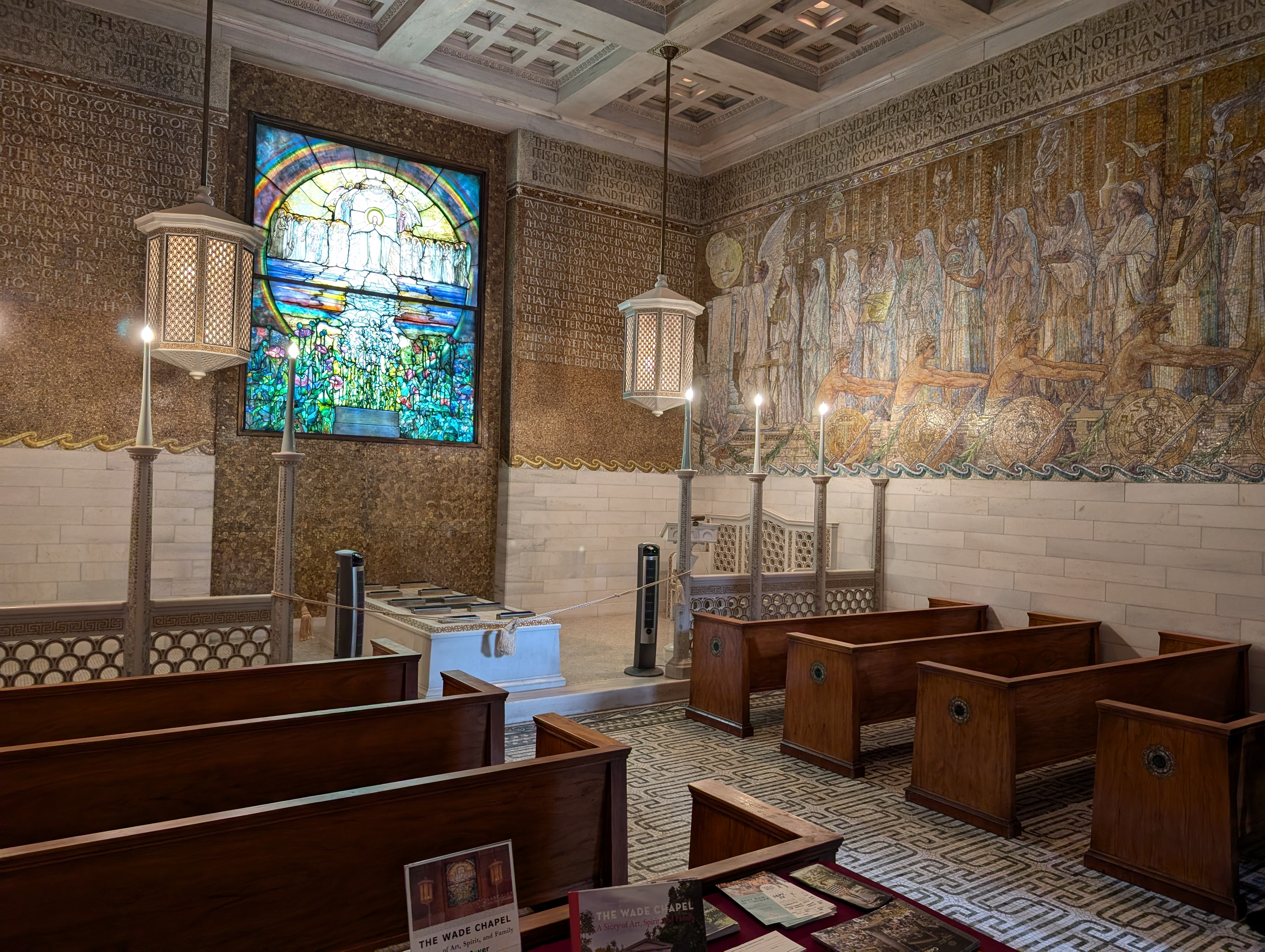
The nave and chancel of Wade Memorial Chapel, with a stained glass window of the Resurrection of Christ (center) and a mosaic of Christian saints (right), along with verses from the Christian Bible in view

Wade's grandchildren included Jeptha Homer Wade II (1857–1926), son of Randall Palmer Wade and Anna Rebecca McGaw Wade. He worked in the banking industry, railway business, mining industry, and manufacturing after graduating from Mt. Pleasant Military Academy in Ossining, New York, and Western Reserve University. He owned the USS Wadena (SP-158). He established the family's Mill Pond Plantation in Thomasville, Georgia, in 1906 (later divided by the family to include the Arcadia Plantation). He bequeathed to the Cleveland Museum of Natural History a large gem collection that is now part of the Jeptha Homer Wade II Gallery of Gems and Jewels. Jeptha H. Wade II was also a founder of the Cleveland Museum of Art, which houses two paintings by Jeptha Wade I.

A grandchild of Jeptha Homer Wade II was Jeptha Homer Wade III (December 26, 1924 – August 8, 2008), son of George Garretson and Irene Love Wade, who was a prominent Boston attorney assisting in the formation of the federal Arms Control and Disarmament Agency, and served in the American Field Service beginning in 1944. He graduated from Massachusetts Institute of Technology in 1946 and Harvard Law School in 1950. He volunteered as an assistant to retired Secretary of the Army John McCloy in the formation of the Arms Control and Disarmament Agency under the Kennedy Administration before returning to Choate, Hall & Stewart in 1961. He was an advocate for nuclear arms control, president of the Lawyers Alliance for Nuclear Arms Control (later known as LAWS, Lawyers for World Security). He married Emily Vanderbilt, daughter of William Henry Vanderbilt III, who in 2015 added to the family's land holdings in Thomasville, Georgia, by purchasing roughly 4,000 acres (1,600 ha) of the Greenwood Plantation. The large tract of old-growth forest will be conserved for research on the ecology of longleaf yellow pine forests. Jeptha Wade has many living descendants.

Wade Memorial Chapel in Cleveland was erected by Jeptha Wade II in honor of his grandfather Jeptha Wade and features a stained glass window of the Resurrection of Christ, along with mosaics of Old Testament prophets and Christian saints, in addition to several verses from the Christian Bible. The mosaics include engravings of the works of mercy given by Jesus in Matthew 25.
