= First transcontinental telegraph =

First telegraph line between the eastern and western United States, completed in 1861

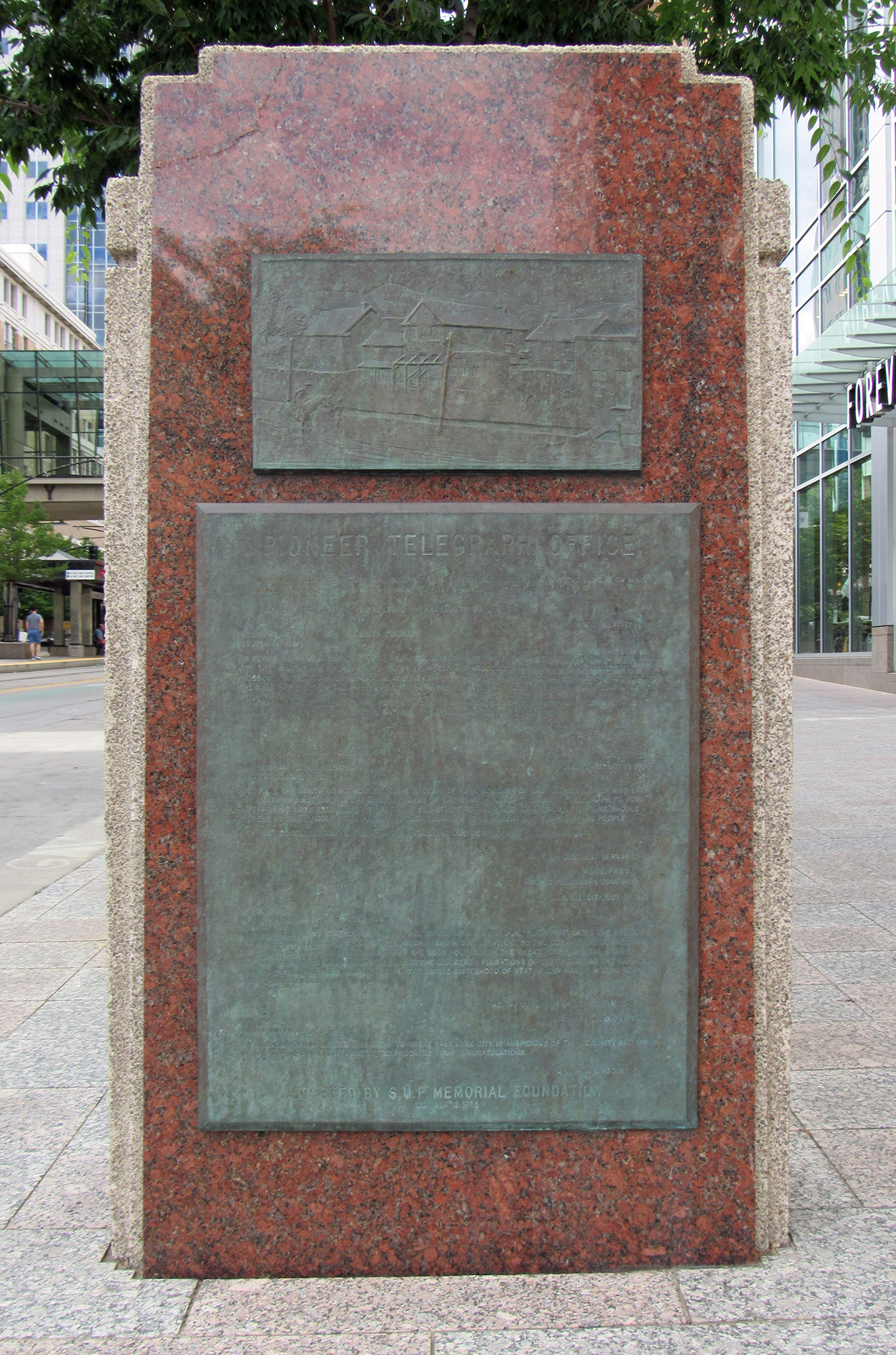
Monument in downtown Salt Lake City, Utah, marking the approximate location where the first transcontinental telegraph line was completed.

The first transcontinental telegraph (completed October 24, 1861) was a line that connected the existing telegraph network in the eastern United States to a small network in California, by means of a link between Omaha, Nebraska, and Carson City, Nevada, via Salt Lake City. It was a milestone in electrical engineering and in the formation of the United States. It served as the only method of near-instantaneous communication between the east and west coasts during the 1860s. For comparison, in 1841, it took 110 days for news of the death of President William Henry Harrison to reach Los Angeles.

== Background ==
After the development of efficient telegraph systems in the 1830s, their use saw almost explosive growth in the 1840s. Samuel Morse's first experimental line between Washington, D.C., and Baltimore—the Baltimore-Washington telegraph line—was demonstrated on May 24, 1844. By 1850 there were lines covering most of the eastern states, and a separate network of lines was soon constructed in the booming economy of California.

California was admitted to the United States in 1850, the first state on the Pacific coast. Major efforts ensued to integrate California with the other states, including sea, overland mail pioneered by George Chorpenning, the Pony Express, and passenger services such as Butterfield Overland Mail. Proposals for the subsidy of a telegraph line to California were made in Congress throughout the 1850s, and in 1860 the U.S. Post Office was authorized to spend $40,000 per year to build and maintain an overland line. The year before, the California State Legislature had authorized a similar subsidy of $6,000 per year.

== Construction ==
Construction of the first transcontinental telegraph was the work of Western Union, which Hiram Sibley, Jeptha Wade, and Ezra Cornell had established in 1856 by merging companies operating east of the Mississippi River. A second significant step was the passing of the Telegraph Act by Congress in 1860, which authorized the government to open bids for the construction of a telegraph line between Missouri and California and regulated the service to be provided. Eventually, the only bidder would be Sibley, because all competitors—Theodore Adams, Benjamin Ficklin and John Harmon—withdrew at the last minute. Later they joined Sibley in his effort.

Similar to the first transcontinental railroad, elimination of the gap in the telegraph service between Fort Kearny in Nebraska and Fort Churchill in Nevada was planned to be divided between teams that would be advancing the construction in opposite directions. The Pacific Telegraph Company would build west from Nebraska and the Overland Telegraph Company would build east from Nevada's connection to the California system. James Gamble, an experienced telegraph builder in California, was put in charge of the western crew, and Edward Creighton was responsible for the eastern crew. From Salt Lake City, a crew in charge of James Street advanced westward, and W.H. Stebbins's crew eastward toward Fort Kearny. Creighton's crew erected its first pole on July 4, 1861. When the project was completed in October 1861, they had planted 27,500 poles holding 2,000 miles (3,200 km) of single-strand iron wire over a terrain that was not always inviting. California Chief Justice Stephen Field sent one of the first messages from San Francisco to Abraham Lincoln, using the occasion to assure the president of California's allegiance to the Union. The construction coincided with Civil War combat to the southeast. The entire cost of the system was half a million dollars (equivalent to $17.5 million in 2024).

== Operation ==
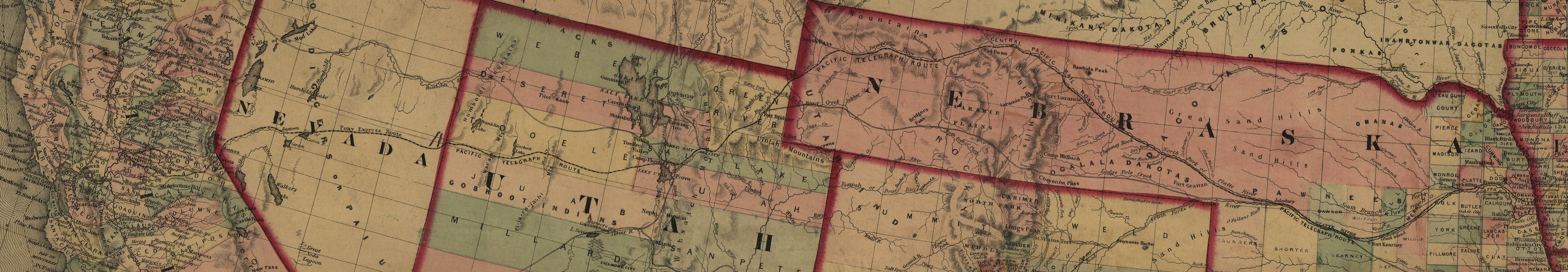
Route of the first transcontinental telegraph

Difficulties did not stop with the completion of the project. Keeping it in operation faced multiple problems: (a) inclement weather in the form of lightning bolts, strong winds, and heavy snow damaged both poles and the wire; (b) rubbing on the poles by bison from time to time sent down sections of the telegraph, eventually contributing to their demise; (c) the system had to be rerouted through Chicago to avoid Confederate attempts to cut the line in Missouri to disrupt communications among Union forces; (d) Native Americans soon started to do the same farther west as part of their hostilities with the Army.

Financially, the first transcontinental telegraph was a big success from the beginning. The charge during the first week of operation was US$1 (equivalent to about $35 in 2024) per word, whereas the Telegraph Act of 1860 had specified 30 cents.

The telegraph line immediately made the Pony Express obsolete, which officially ceased operations two days later. The overland telegraph line was operated until 1869, when it was replaced by a multi-line telegraph that had been constructed alongside the route of the first transcontinental railroad.

== See also ==
- Telegraph in United States history
- Australian Overland Telegraph Line, a north–south Australian telegraph line completed in 1872

== Bibliography ==
- Peters, Arthur K. (1996). Seven Trails West. Abbeville Press. ISBN 1-55859-782-4.
- Jepsen, Thomas (1987). "The Telegraph Comes to Colorado: A New Technology and Its Consequences". Essays and Monographs in Colorado History. 7: 1–25.

== External links and sources ==
- Contemporary account of the construction of the transcontinental telegraph
- History of the first transcontinental telegraph
- Central Pacific Railroad Photographic History Museum: Pacific Telegraph Act of 1860
