= Pacific Telegraph Company =

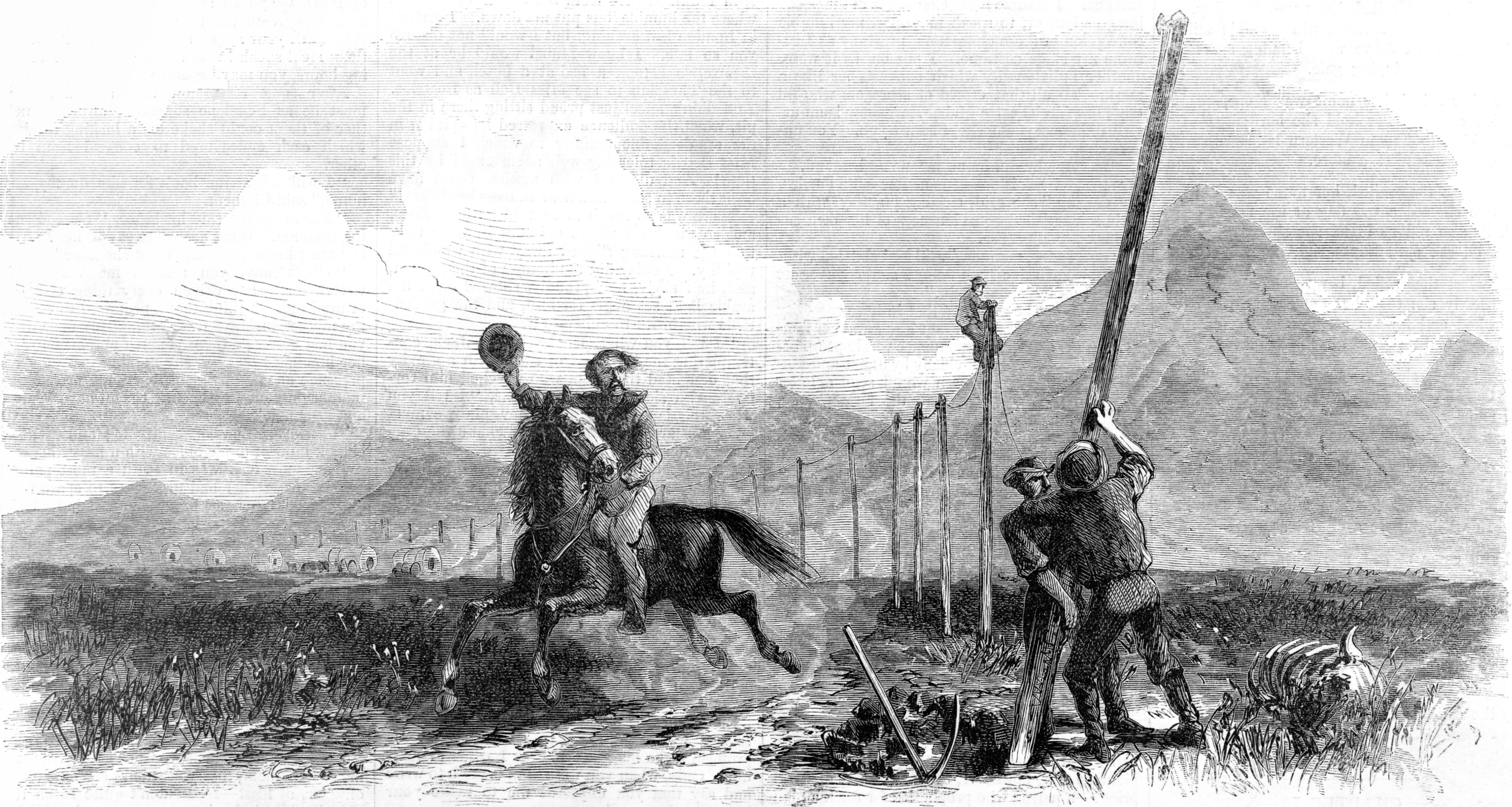
- Depiction of the construction of the first Transcontinental Telegraph, with a Pony Express rider passing below.
- Founded: January 11, 1864; 162 years ago
- Founder: Jeptha H. Wade
- Products: telegraph line
- Parent: Western Union Telegraph Company

The Pacific Telegraph Company was one of the organizations responsible for constructing the telegraph line which resulted in the first transcontinental telegraph network in the United States. The company built the section of line between Julesburg, Colorado Territory (where it connected with existing telegraph networks to the eastern United States) and Salt Lake City, Utah Territory.

The Pacific Telegraph Company's line was completed on October 17, 1861 (although the first messages were not sent until October 18), allowing telegraphic messages from Salt Lake City to reach the eastern United States. The Overland Telegraph Company's line from California reached the telegraph office in downtown Salt Lake City on October 24, 1861, completing the transcontinental network. The Pacific Telegraph Company was absorbed into the Western Union Telegraph Company in 1864.

== History ==
=== Organization ===
The Pacific Telegraph Act of 1860 called for the facilitation of telegraphic communication between the east and west coasts of the United States. A contract for construction of the telegraph line, as authorized by the act, was awarded to Hiram Sibley of the Western Union Telegraph Company. Sibley and the Western Union would organize other telegraph companies to build the line.

On January 11, 1864, the Nebraska Territorial Legislature incorporated the Pacific Telegraph Company, which was then organized on April 17, 1861, in Rochester, New York. The company's board of directors was largely made up of men who were also directors of the Western Union Telegraph Company. Jeptha H. Wade was elected president of the new company with Hiram Sibley as vice-president.

Also serving on the board was Charles M. Stebbins, president of the Missouri and Western Telegraph Company, another company controlled by Western Union interests. The Missouri and Western Telegraph Company had already completed a line from Brownville to Fort Kearny (both in Nebraska Territory), via Omaha. In 1861, this same company would extend the line from Fort Kearny to Julesburg, and it was from Julesburg that the Pacific Telegraph Company would build west to Salt Lake City in Utah Territory. Brownville was stated as the eastern terminus for the telegraph line in Sibley's contract with the federal government.

=== Construction and operation ===
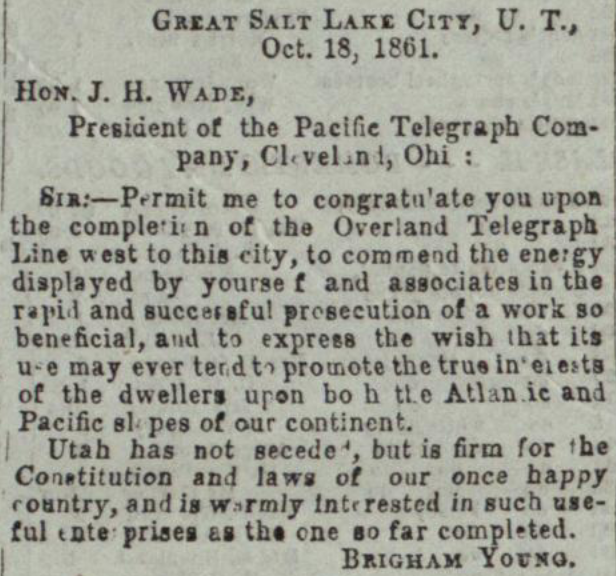
The first message sent east from Salt Lake City on the new telegraph line, as published by the Deseret News October 23, 1861.

Edward Creighton managed construction for the company, which started in Nebraska Territory on July 4, 1861, and simultaneously from Salt Lake City a week later.

The Pacific Telegraph Company's line was completed to Salt Lake City on October 17, 1861, and the first messages were sent the following day, October 18. Brigham Young, President of the Church of Jesus Christ of Latter-day Saints, sent the first message to company president Jeptha H. Wade, congratulating him on the completion of the work. Afterwards, Frank Fuller, acting governor of Utah Territory, sent a telegram to President Abraham Lincoln saying the citizens of the territory were loyal to the United States.

The transcontinental telegraph led to the immediate demise of the Pony Express.

=== Acquisition ===
The Pacific Telegraph Company was absorbed into the Western Union Telegraph Company on March 17, 1864.
