= Hiram Sibley =

American entrepreneur and philanthropist (1807–1888)

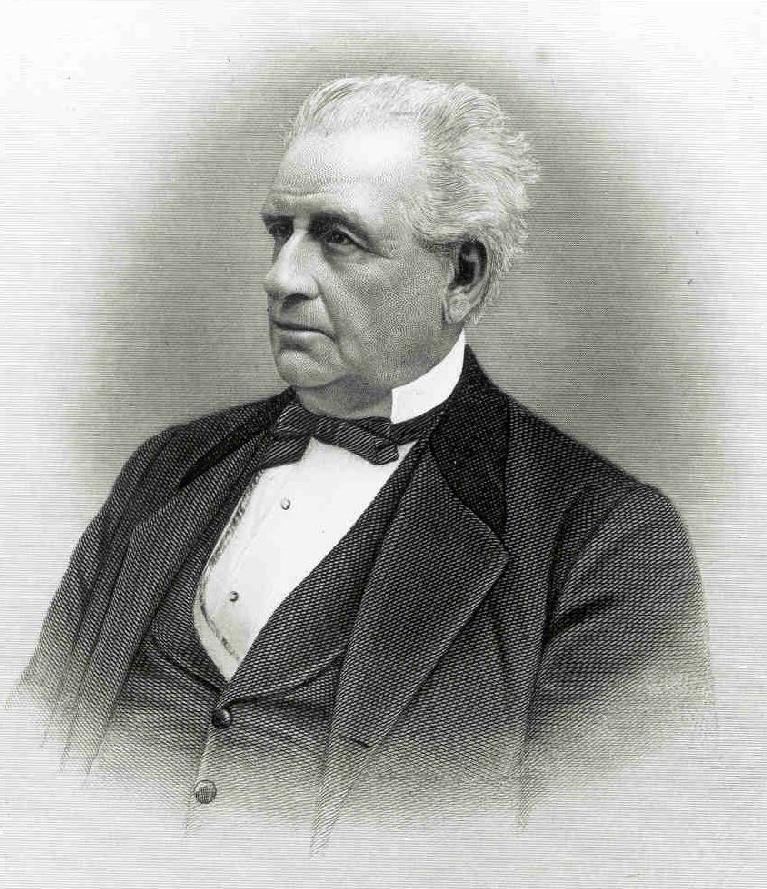
- Born: Hiram Sibley; February 6, 1807; North Adams, Massachusetts, U.S.
- Died: July 12, 1888 (aged 81); Rochester, New York, U.S.
- Known for: Co-founder and President of Western Union
- Children: 4, including Emily Sibley Watson

Hiram Sibley (February 6, 1807 – July 12, 1888) was an American industrialist, entrepreneur, and philanthropist who was a pioneer of the telegraph in the United States.

== Early life ==
Sibley was born in North Adams, Massachusetts, on February 6, 1807, and later resided in Rochester, New York. He was the second son of Benjamin Sibley (1768–1829) and Zilpha (née Davis) Sibley (1771–1824).

== Career ==
Too poor to receive more than a country education, Sibley started training as a shoemaker's apprentice, but, unhappy with the career, went to Lima, New York, at age 17 to work in a cotton factory. The following year he became a wool carder in a shop where future president Millard Fillmore then worked. At age 21, he started a foundry and machine shop in Mendon, New York. Ten years later, the business was successful enough for him to sell and afford to move to Rochester, where he was elected Sheriff of Monroe County from 1844 to 1846.

He became interested in the work of Samuel Morse involving the telegraph. In 1851, Sibley along with Ezra Cornell and others organized the New York and Mississippi Valley Printing Telegraph Company in Rochester. Sibley later served as first president of Western Union Telegraph Company.

In 1861, Jeptha Wade, founder of Western Union, joined forces with Benjamin Franklin Ficklin and Hiram Sibley to form the Pacific Telegraph Company. With it, the final link between the eastern and western coasts of the United States was made by telegraph. In conjunction with Perry Collins, Sibley later hoped to build a telegraph line from Alaska to Russia through the Bering Strait, the so-called Russian American Telegraph. However, this dream collapsed with the establishment of a cross-Atlantic line to Europe.

== Personal life ==
Sibley was married to Elizabeth Maria Tinker (1815–1903), the daughter of Giles Tinker of Connecticut. Together, they were the parents of:

- Zilpha Louise Sibley (1833–1868)
- Giles Benjamin Sibley (1841–1843), who died in infancy.
- Hiram Watson Sibley (1845–1932), president of Security Trust Company of Rochester.
- Emily Sibley (1855–1945), a founder of the Memorial Art Gallery of the University of Rochester.

After a five-day illness, Sibley died on July 12, 1888, and was interred at Mount Hope Cemetery in Rochester. At his death, his wealth was estimated between $8,000,000 and $10,000,000.

== Legacy ==
Sibley's Legacy

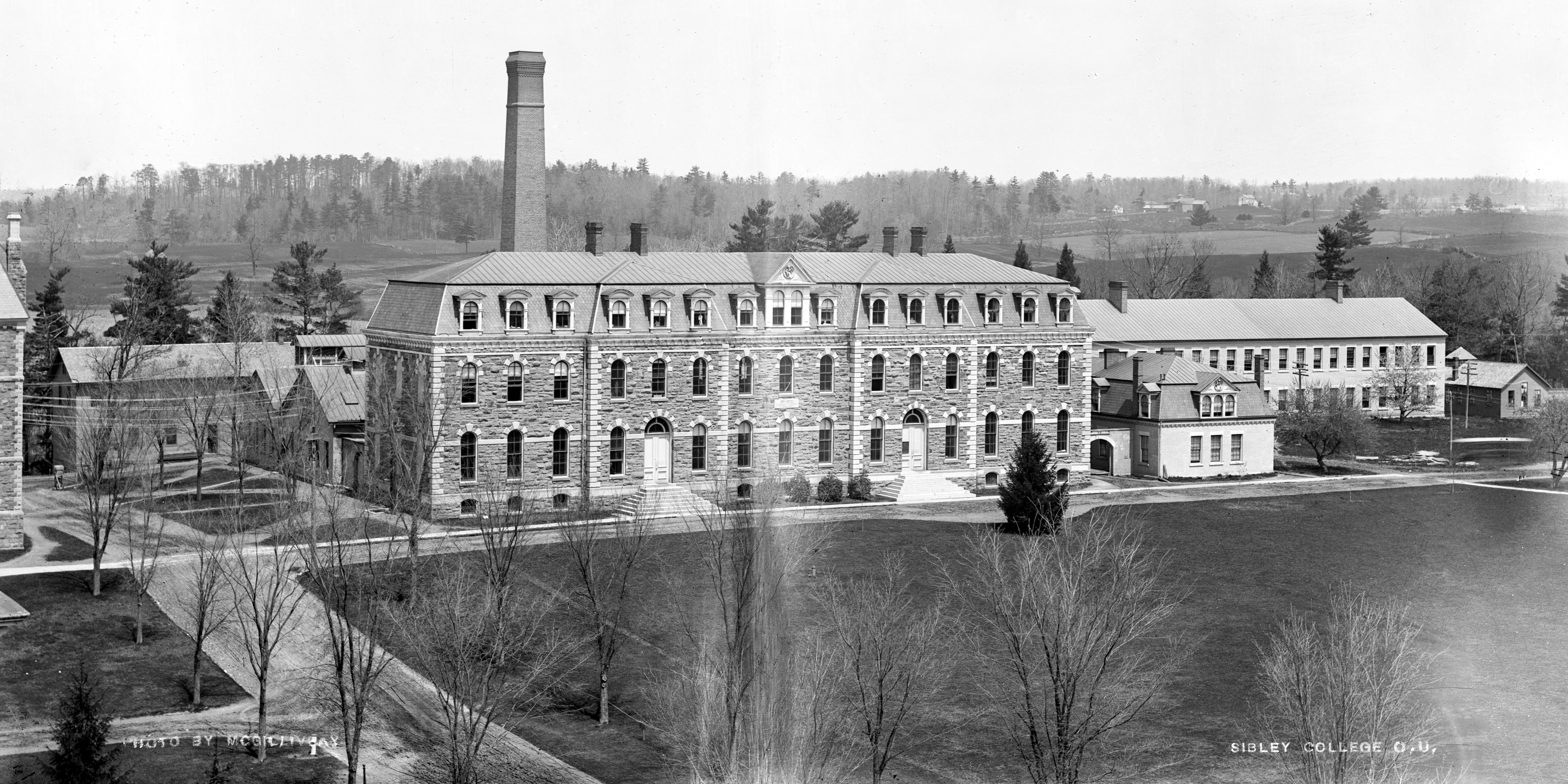
Cornell's Sibley College ca 1880s

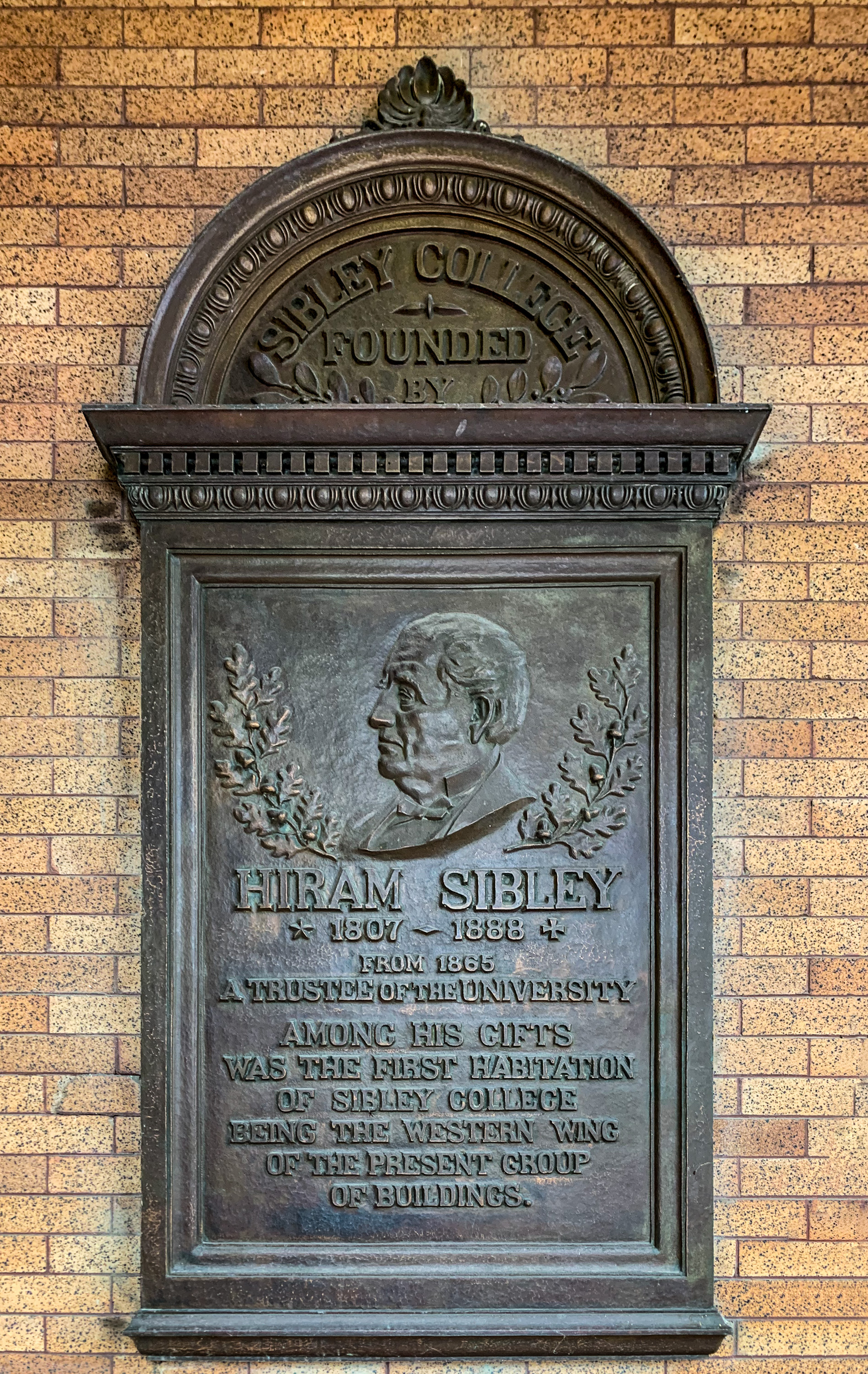
Plaque at Sibley Hall

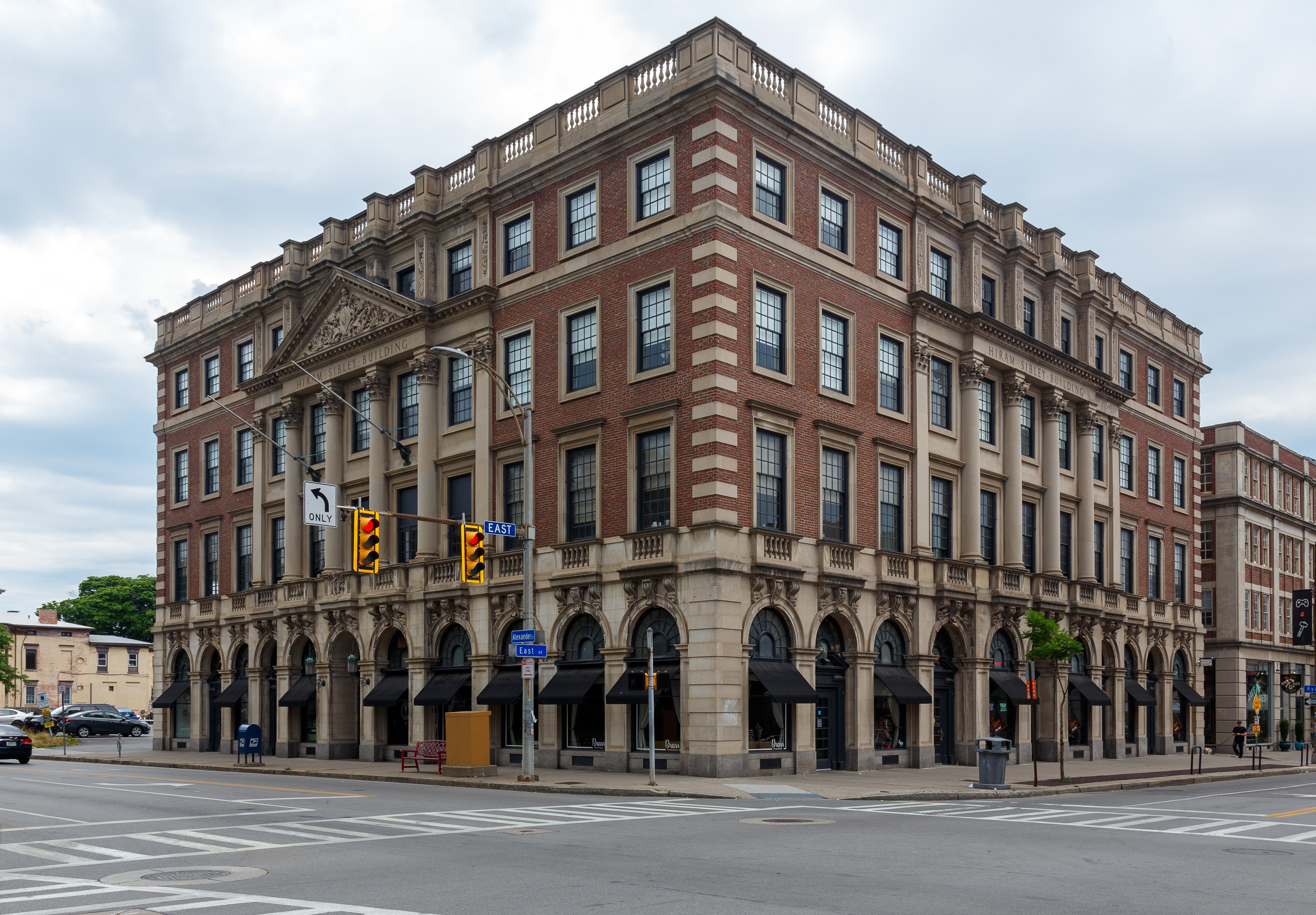
Hiram Sibley Building in Rochester

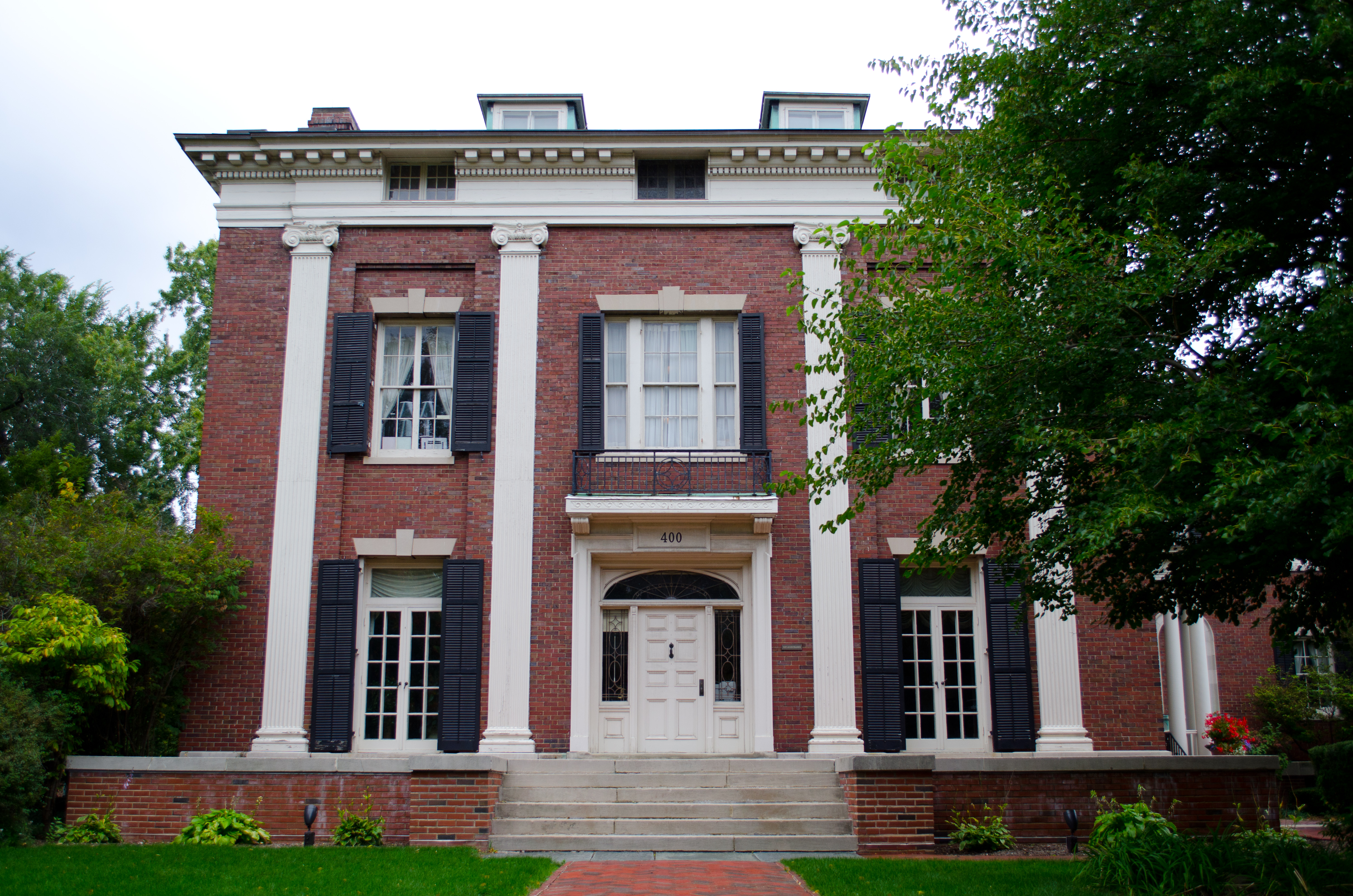
Hiram Sibley House in Rochester

In 1874 Sibley funded a library for the University of Rochester. Completed in 1877, it was the second building of the Prince Street campus, and later became part of the Eastman School of Music. The original Sibley Library building was sold in 1956 and torn down in 1968.

In 1876 Sibley founded and endowed the Sibley College of Mechanical Engineering and Mechanic Arts, as well as the building which housed it, Sibley Hall, at Cornell University in Ithaca, New York. The program is now known as the Sibley School of Mechanical and Aerospace Engineering, and is located in parts of Upson, Grumman and Rhodes Halls. Sibley Hall is now a part of the Cornell University College of Architecture, Art, and Planning.

Sibley's home, the Hiram Sibley Homestead, located in Mendon was added to the National Register of Historic Places in 1985. The surrounding area of the homestead is known as the hamlet of Sibleyville, named in Sibley's honor.

His home in Rochester is a part of the East Avenue Historic District.

The Hiram Sibley Building was built in 1925 at the corner of East Avenue and Alexander Street in Rochester, New York. It was named in his honor by his son Hiram Watson Sibley, and designed by Shepley, Bulfinch and Abbott of Boston.

== See also ==
- Telegraph in United States history
- Western Union
