= Goshute Valley =

Valley in Elk County, Nevada, United States

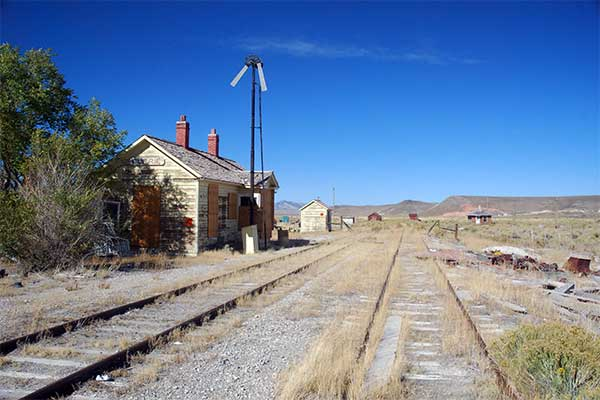
- The abandoned Nevada Northern Railway depot in Currie, September 2007

- Location within Nevada
- Length: 60 mi (97 km) north-south trending
- Width: 12 mi (19 km)

Geography
- Country: United States
- State: Nevada
- District: Elko County
- Borders on: List: Toano Range; Cherry Creek Range; Antelope Valley; Dolly Varden Mountains; Currie Hills; Steptoe Valley; Pequop Mountains
- Coordinates: 40°46′13″N 114°24′48″W
- Interactive map of Goshute Valley

The Goshute Valley is an endorheic landform of the Great Basin in Elko County, Nevada, United States.

== Description ==
The towns of Oasis and Cobre are in the valley's north, and the central and north of the valley contains broken flatlands, with short washes draining from the surrounding mountain ranges.

Interstate 80 crosses the valley and has a junction with State Route 233 at Oasis. The Nevada Northern Railway traverses the valley north from Ely and intersects the Western Pacific Railroad at Shafter and continues on north to a connection with the Southern Pacific Railroad at Cobre.

The southern 25 mi (40 km) of the valley turns southwest and includes the northeast-flowing Nelson Creek which drains into a flatland sink. Currie is in the Steptoe Valley to the southwest end of the Goshute Valley adjacent a drainage divide between the north flowing Nelson Creek and the south flowing drainage into the intermittent Goshute Lake near the ghost town of Goshute. The Goshute Canyon Wilderness lies to the southwest in White Pine County.

== Salt desert ==
The Goshute Valley includes the largest of the Nevada salt desert ecoregions.

== See also ==
- List of valleys of Nevada
