= Cherry Creek Range =

Mountain range in Nevada, United States

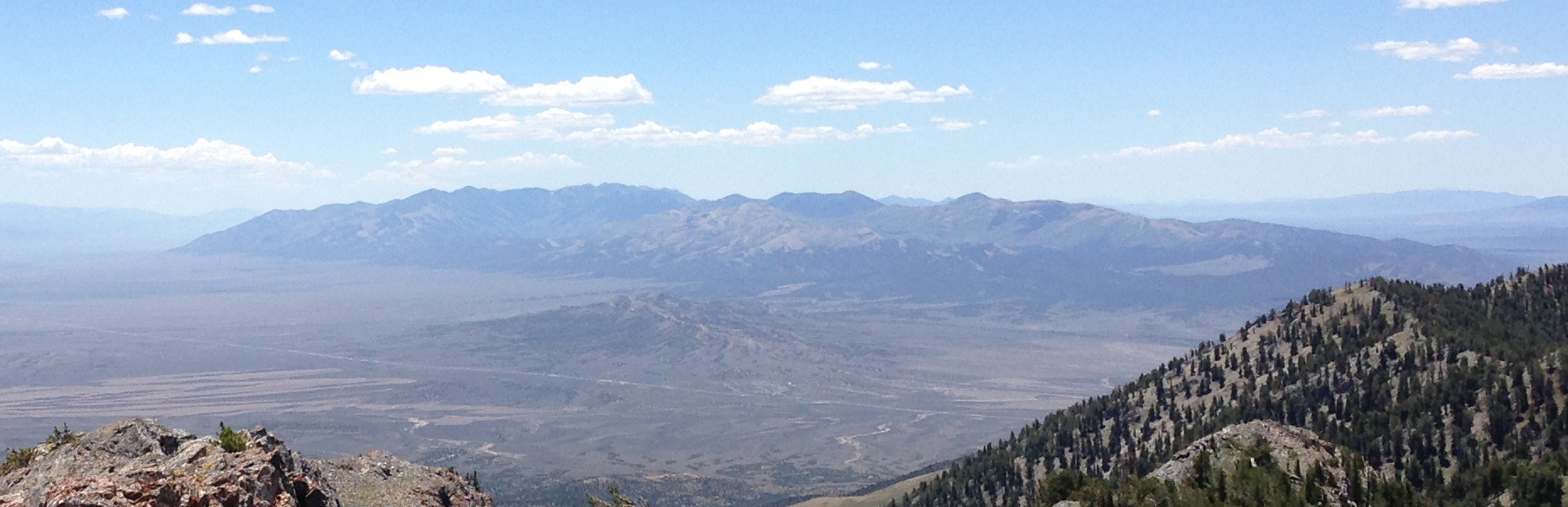
- Cherry Creek Range viewed from Spruce Mountain, Nevada

Highest point
- Elevation: 10,458 ft (3,188 m)

Geography
- Location within Nevada
- Country: United States
- State: Nevada
- Districts: White Pine County and Elko County
- Range coordinates: 40°3′34.755″N 114°52′59.101″W
- Topo map: USGS Paris Creek

The Cherry Creek Range is a line of mountains, Basin and Range faulted, in northern White Pine and southern Elko Counties, in northeastern Nevada in the western United States. The range runs generally north–south for approximately 50 miles (80 km). The highest point in the range is an unnamed peak, (10,458 feet, 3187 m) located just south of the border between the counties.

To the west are Butte Valley and the Butte Mountains, while to the east are Steptoe Valley, the Schell Creek Range, U.S. Route 93, and the historic mining community of Cherry Creek. To the north is Spruce Mountain, attached to the southwest of the Pequop Mountains; Goshute Valley lies east of the Pequop's but turns southwest at the northeast foothills border of the Cherry Creek Range, the location of Currie. South of the Cherry Creek Range are the Egan Range and Egan Canyon, the route of the Pony Express in this part of the Great Basin. The center of the range is deeply cut by the Goshute Basin – the location of the Goshute Canyon Wilderness Study Area.

== See also ==
- Goshute Canyon Wilderness
