= Tippett =

Tippett is a surname. Notable people with the surname include:

- Adam Tippett (born 1979), Australian rugby league footballer
- Alan Tippett (1911–1988), Australian Methodist missionary, missiologist, and anthropologist
- Andre Tippett (born 1959), American Hall of Fame footballer
- Barry Tippett (born 1957), Australian rules footballer
- Bradley Tippett (born 1988), Australian baseball player
- Clark Tippet (1954–1992), American dancer
- Coby Tippett, American football coach and son of Andre
- Dave Tippett (born 1961), Canadian ice hockey coach
- George Frederick Tippett (1828–1899), English builder and entrepreneur
- Helen Tippett (1933–2004), Australian and New Zealand architect and academic
- James Sterling Tippett (1885–1958), American educator
- Joe Tippett (born 1982), American actor
- Joel Tippett (born 1988), Australian rules footballer
- Keith Tippett (born 1947), English pianist known for work with King Crimson
- Krista Tippett (born 1960), American journalist, author, public intellectual, and entrepreneur
- Kurt Tippett (born 1987), Australian rules footballer and brother of Joel
- L. H. C. Tippett (1902–1985), English statistician
- Liz Whitney Tippett (1906–1988), American philanthropist
- Lynette Tippett, New Zealand psychologist and academic
- Maria Tippett (1944–2024), Canadian historian
- Michael Tippett (1905–1998), English composer
- Michael Tippett (businessman) (born 1970), Canadian entrepreneur, columnist and educator
- Owen Tippett (born 1999), Canadian ice hockey player
- Peter Tippett (born 1953), American physician, researcher, and inventor
- Peter Tippett (footballer) (1926–1990), Australian rules footballer
- Phil Tippett (born 1951), American animator, visual effects supervisor and founder of Tippett Studio
- Stanley James Tippett, Canadian criminal
- Tom Tippett (1904–1997), English footballer
- W. Paul Tippett Jr. (1932–2015), American business executive

== Fictional characters ==
- Gerald Tippett, a character in Shortland Street

== See also ==
- Tippetts
- 4081 Tippett, an asteroid
- Tippett, Nevada, a populated place
- Tippett Canyon, Nevada
- Tippett Studio, a visual effects company
