= Antelope Valley (Elko-White Pine Counties) =

Valley on the Nevada Utah state line

- Location within Nevada
- Length: 70 mi (110 km)

Geography
- Location: Kinsley Mountains
- Country: United States
- State: Nevada
- Districts: Elko County; White Pine County
- Population center: Tippett, NV
- Borders on: List: Dolly Varden Mountains; Goshute Mountains; South Mountains; Kern Mountains; Spring Valley; Antelope Range
- Coordinates: 40°9′54.761″N 114°20′22.056″W
- Interactive map of Antelope Valley

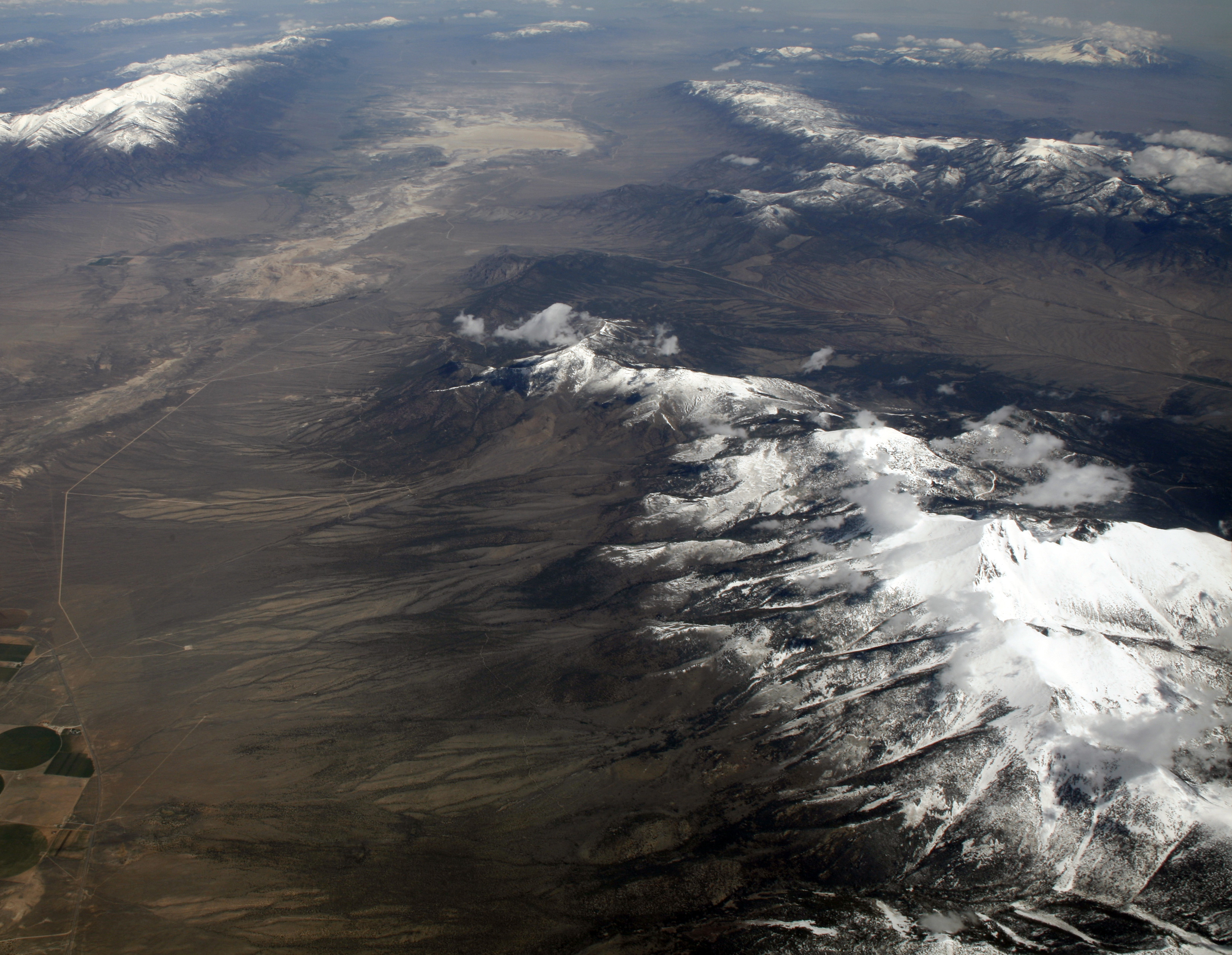

The Antelope Valley adjacent to the Nevada/Utah state line, and located in southeast Elko County and northeast White Pine County, Nevada is a 70 mi (113 km) long endorheic valley. The valley curves around the Dolly Varden and Kinsley Mountains, and the Antelope Range.

The valley is separated into two sections north and south, with an unnamed badlands region, at 40°07′45″N 114°07′59″W (though labelled as such) between eastern mountain ranges on its central-east perimeter. These badlands are on the Nevada/Utah border and southeast of Ferber Hills a small range of hills, mostly in Elko County, Nevada and partially in Tooele County, Utah.

A large two-lobed playa region makes up most of the south valley region, and can be easily seen from surrounding mountain ridgelines.

== Description ==
Antelope Valley is about 70 mi long, north–south, but arc-shaped pointing due-west around the three mountain ranges. The center of the valley is adjacent the small range, 3 by 8 mi long, the Kinsley Mountains slightly offset by Kinsley Draw, from the Antelope Range southwest; it is also separated from the Dolly Varden Mountains northwest by three small watershed areas of the north Antelope Range's foothills.

Two sections of the valley are created, a northwest-trending section, and the other, southwest-trending. The north section borders the southwest of Goshute Valley. The south merges into the extensive north–south Spring Valley, the north end of which extends into a bifurcation at the southwest end of the Antelope Range, where the Schell Creek Range is bordered to the west.

== Access ==
U.S. Route 93 (Alternate) crosses the southern section of the north valley toward the Goshute Mountains.
