= Spruce Mountain =

Spruce Mountain may refer to:

- Spruce Mountain (Arizona), in the Bradshaw Mountains
- Spruce Mountain (Colorado), a summit of Colorado
- Spruce Mountain (Maine), a ski slope in Jay, Maine
- Spruce Mountain (Nevada)
- Spruce Mountain (New York), in Saratoga County
- Spruce Mountain (Ulster County, New York)
- Spruce Mountain (Wells, New York), in Hamilton County
- Spruce Mountain (Vermont) in Plainfield, Vermont
- Spruce Mountain (West Virginia), with the highest point (Spruce Knob) in the state and in the Alleghenies

== See also ==
- Sprucemont, Nevada, a ghost town near Spruce Mountain
