= Tippet (disambiguation) =

A tippet is a scarf-like garment.

Tippet may also refer to:

- Tippet (surname)
- A piece of fly fishing tackle
- A bird's neck plumage
- An animal's neck fur
