= Tippet (surname) =

Tippet is a surname. Notable people with the surname include:

- Anthony Tippet (1928–2006), British naval officer
- Clark Tippet (1954–1992), American dancer
- Herbert Charles Tippet (1891–1947), British golfer
- William Tippet (1782–1824), British jurist

== See also ==
- Tippit (surname)
- Tippett, surname
