= Montello, Nevada =

- Census-designated place
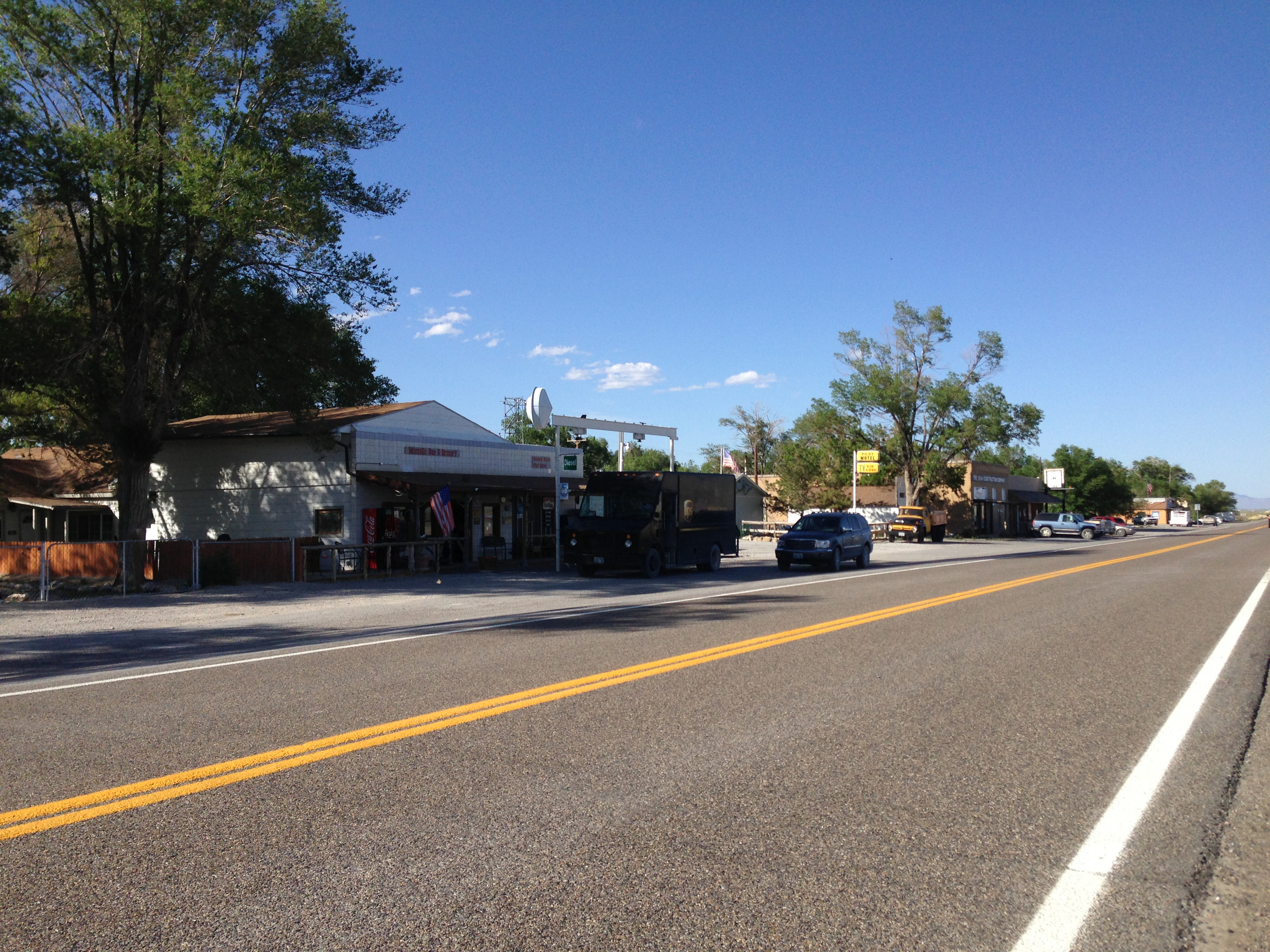

- Location within the state of Nevada
- Coordinates: 41°16′01″N 114°11′49″W
- Country: United States
- State: Nevada
- County (United States): Elko

Area
  - Total: 0.41 sq mi (1.07 km^{2})
  - Land: 0.41 sq mi (1.07 km^{2})
  - Water: 0 sq mi (0.00 km^{2})
- Elevation: 4,892 ft (1,491 m)

Population (2020)
  - Total: 66
  - Density: 160.5/sq mi (61.96/km^{2})
- Time zone: UTC-8 (Pacific (PST))
  - Summer (DST): UTC-7 (PDT)
- ZIP code: 89830
- FIPS code: 32-48400
- GNIS feature ID: 2583943

Montello is a census-designated place (CDP) in Elko County, Nevada, United States. It is home to Montello Elementary School, which is part of the Elko County School District. As of the 2020 census, Montello had a population of 66.

Montello is part of the Elko Micropolitan Statistical Area.

== History ==
The first permanent settlement at Montello was made in 1869. The town of Montello was established in 1904 as a "division point" (operations base) for the Southern Pacific Railroad. Montello's development was prompted by the construction of the Lucin Cutoff across the Great Salt Lake in Utah, a line that bypassed the area's former division point town of Terrace, Utah. Many of the original houses in Montello were moved there from Terrace and nearby Kelton, Utah. Montello was originally named "Bauvard", and received its current name in 1912. The word Montello is Italian for "little mountain" and was probably given by one of the early Italian settlers.

Montello was at its peak in the 1910s and early 1920s, with a population of perhaps 800. While the town's economic life was dominated by the railroad, it also served as a community center for local ranchers and as a supply point for the nearby mining camp of Delano. Montello began declining in the late 1920s, however; railroad employment began to lessen and a 1925 fire devastated the town's business district. The primary factor in Montello's decline, though, was the railroad's shift from steam to diesel locomotives, which took place in the 1940s and early 1950s. This rendered the servicing facilities at Montello obsolete, and they were removed by the Southern Pacific in the 1950s.

In February 2017, the town was flooded after a very wet winter. The failure of the "Twenty One Mile" earthen dam did not contribute to Montello flooding. Sections of State Route 30, State Route 233, and U.S. Highway 93 were closed, some sections of road were washed out and rail traffic had to be re-routed.

== Geography ==
Montello is located in eastern Elko County along Nevada State Route 233, 23 miles (37 km) northeast of Interstate 80 at Oasis and 11 miles (18 km) southwest of the Utah border. Elko, the county seat, is 100 miles (160 km) to the west.

According to the U.S. Census Bureau, the Montello CDP has an area of 0.39 square miles (1.0 km^{2}), all of it land.

== Demographics ==
Historical population
Census	Pop.	Note	%±
2020	66		—
U.S. Decennial Census
