= Tippit (surname) =

Tippit is a surname. Notable people with the surname include:

- J. D. Tippit (1924–1963), American policeman
- Jack Tippit (1923–1994), American cartoonist
- Wayne Tippit (1932–2009), American actor

== See also ==
- Tippet (surname)
- Tippett, surname
