= Colville Gardens =

Cul-de-sac street in Notting Hill, London, England

Coordinates: 51°30′57″N 0°12′11″W

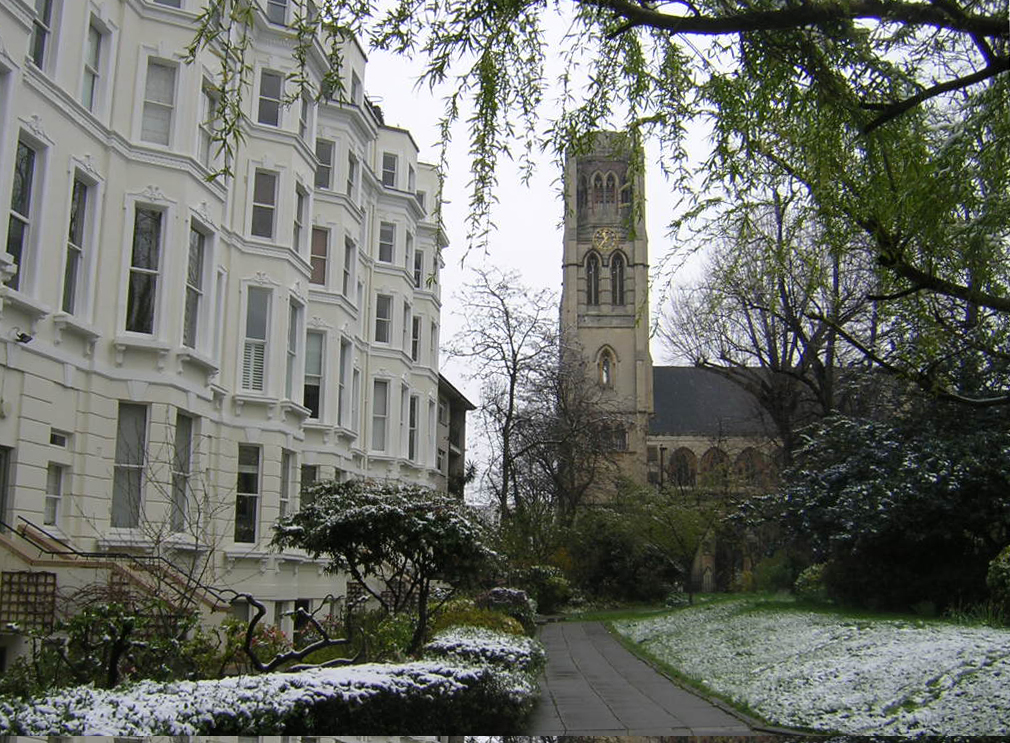
A view of Pinehurst Court, at 1-9 Colville Gardens, showing All Saints' Church in the background

Colville Gardens is a Victorian cul-de-sac street in the Royal Borough of Kensington and Chelsea, located north of Colville Terrace and east of the Portobello Market in Notting Hill, London, England. It is bordered on the north side by All Saints' Church.

Colville is also a ward of the Royal Borough. The population of the ward at the 2011 Census was 8,377.

== History ==
Colville Gardens was initially laid out in the 1870s by the builder George Frederick Tippett, who also developed much of the rest of the neighbourhood. It is possible that the street was named after the Colville Family, Scottish steel magnates. The houses were intended as single family homes for the well-to-do but, from the beginning, it proved difficult to attract wealthy buyers to the area and as early as 1888, the buildings began to be subdivided into flats.

In 1885, Tippett was declared bankrupt. He attributed his failure to "his inability to let a large portion of his property and to the pressure of secured creditors". Gradually, the character of the buildings changed as wealthier tenants left the area.

By 1928, the neighbourhood was described as "rapidly becoming poorer" and, by 1935, as a "largely slum area...large houses turned into one-room tenements and small flats".

Further decline set in as residents moved away during World War II to escape The Blitz and, indeed, one of the buildings at the end of the street was destroyed by bombing, which also damaged numerous other buildings including All Saints' Church.

The street continued to deteriorate in the 1960s and 1970s, along with the rest of Notting Hill, and the neighbourhood became notorious for the predatory business practices of slum landlord Peter Rachman. However, from the 1980s onwards, the street gradually improved, reflecting the general revival of Notting Hill in recent years. 1-9 Colville Gardens, formerly a notorious slum building, was rebranded as Pinehurst Court in the 1970s and now comprises around 105 one and two bedroom flats, mostly leased to private tenants on long leases of 100 years or more.

== Notable residents ==
- John Gawsworth (1912–1970), writer, poet and compiler of anthologies, grew up in Colville Gardens. He was crowned the king of the tiny Caribbean island of Redonda in 1947, and became known as King Juan I. His real name was Terence Ian Fytton Armstrong.

== See also ==
- Notting Hill
- Pinehurst Court
