= Maverick Canyon (Nevada) =

Canyon in Elko County, Nevada, United States

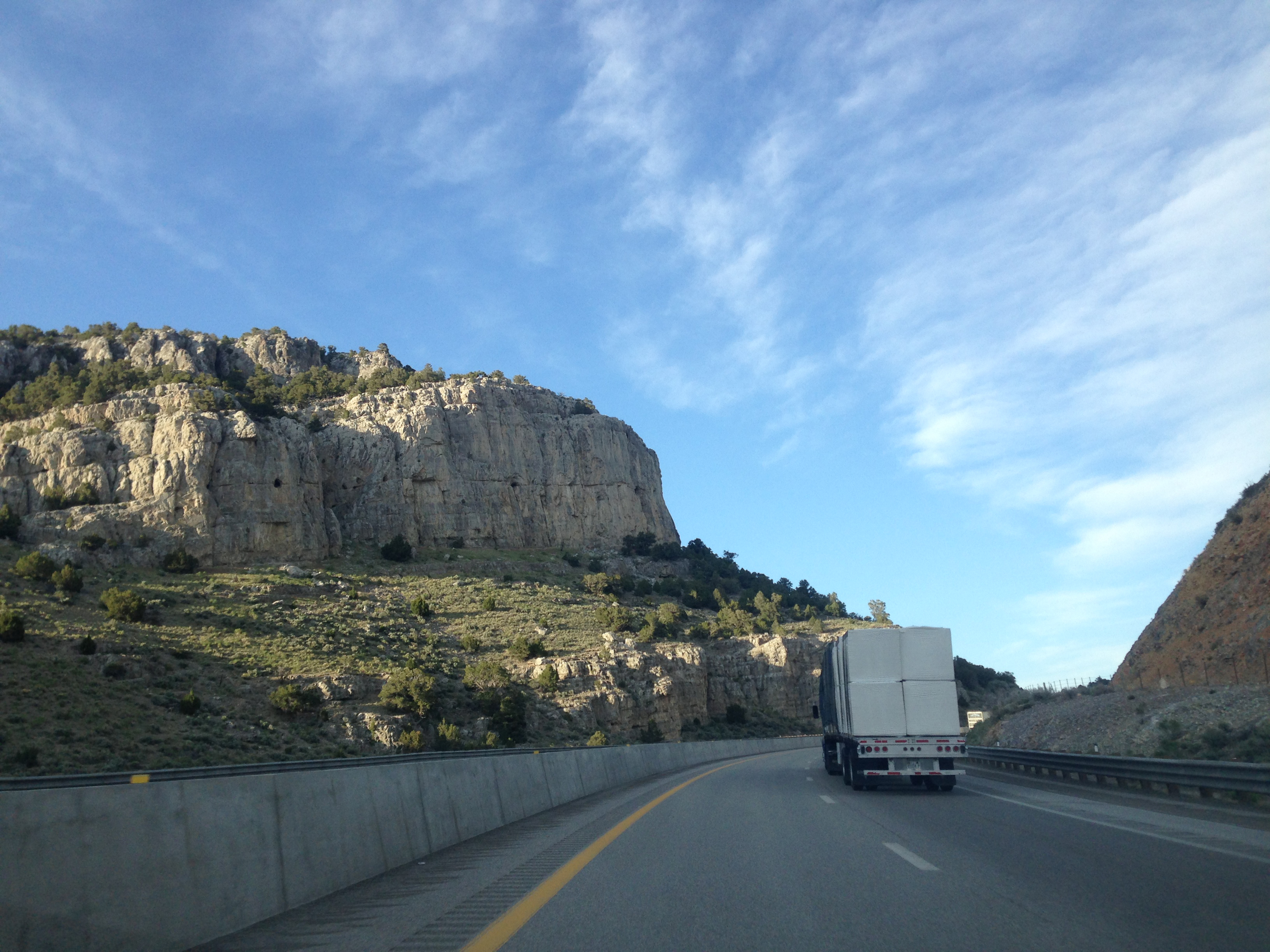
- View east along Interstate 80 as it ascends Maverick Canyon towards Pequop Summit

- Location within Nevada
- Floor elevation: 5,738 feet (1,700 m) at the mouth

Geography
- Location: Elko County, Nevada, United States
- Coordinates: 41°03′59″N 114°36′20″W
- Interactive map of Maverick Canyon

Maverick Canyon is a steep-sided canyon in the Pequop Mountains of Elko County, Nevada, United States. Interstate 80 traverses the canyon as it ascends the Pequop Mountains from the west.
