= Nevada State Route 233 =

State highway in Nevada, United States

State Route 233
- Montello Road

Route information
- Maintained by NDOT
- Length: 34.256 mi (55.130 km)
- Existed: 1978–present
- History: SR 30 by 1933

Major junctions
- South end: I-80 in Oasis
- North end: SR-30 at the Utah state line near Montello

Location
- Country: United States
- State: Nevada
- Counties: Elko

Highway system
- Nevada State Highway System; Interstate; US; State; Pre‑1976; Scenic
← SR 232	→ SR 264

State Route 233 (SR 233) is a 34.256-mile (55.130 km) state highway in rural eastern Elko County, Nevada, United States. The highway follows the route of the First transcontinental railroad from Interstate 80 (I-80) to the Utah state line. The highway was formerly numbered State Route 30.

== Route description ==
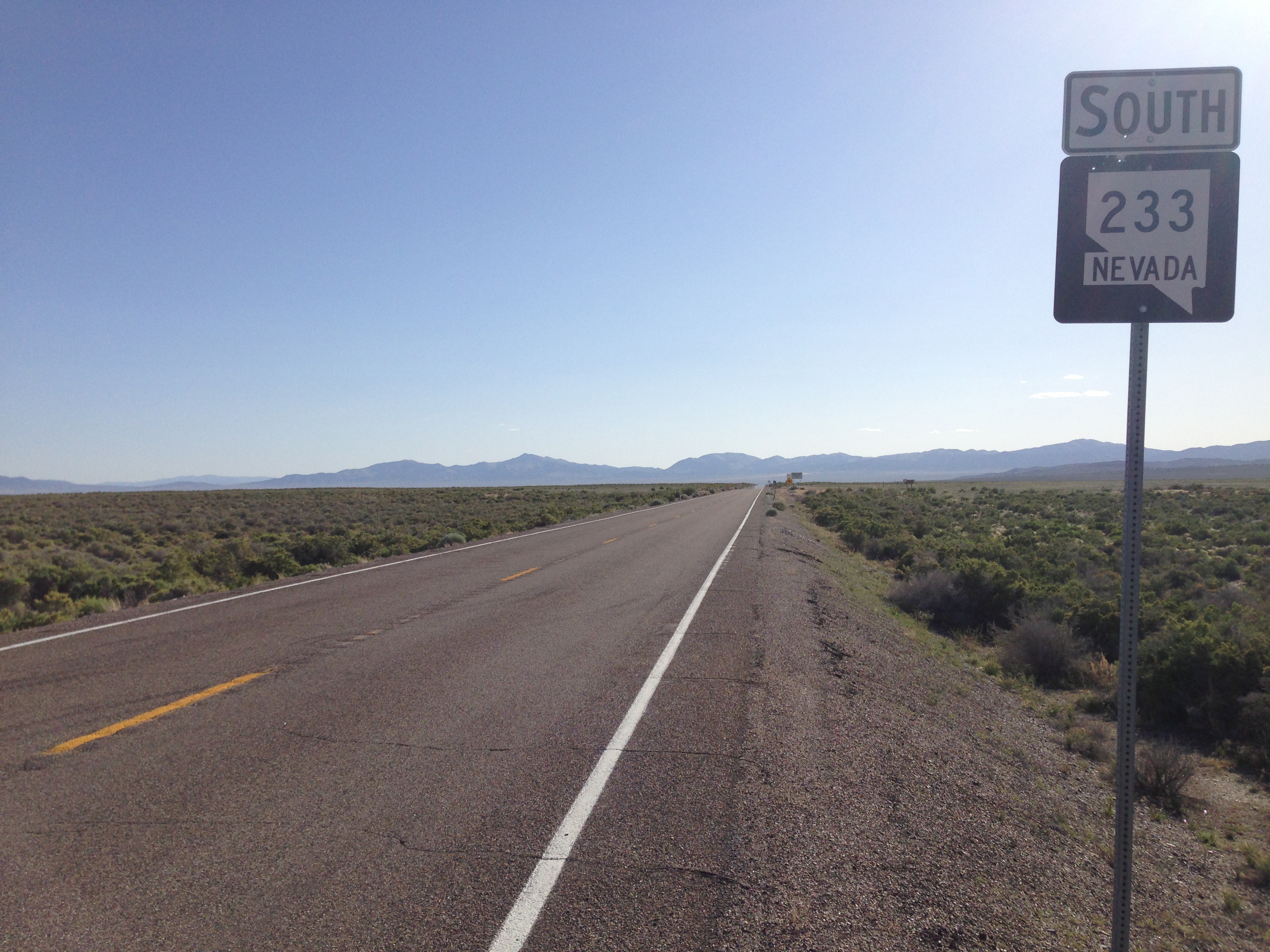
View from the north end of SR 233 looking southbound, June 2014

I-80 follows the route of the First Transcontinental Railroad throughout most of Nevada, but departs this corridor east of Wells. The historical route went around the north end of the Pequop Mountains, towards the north shore of the Great Salt Lake. Modern I-80 directly crosses these mountains en route to the south shore of the lake. State Route 233 exits I-80 at Exit 378 in Oasis, on the other side of the Pequops from Wells. Route 233 proceeds on a northeast course to rejoin the route of the railroad. The highway passes through the community of Monetello en route to the Utah state line, where the highway continues as Utah State Route 30. In Utah, the route also loosely follows the historical routes of the railroad around the north side of the Great Salt Lake until connecting with Interstate 84.

== History ==
This corridor parallels the route of the First Transcontinental Railroad.

The highway was originally State Route 30. The highway first appeared on the official Nevada state highway map in 1933. The connecting highway in Utah was originally numbered State Route 70, but was renumbered Route 30 in 1966. With this change the highway carried the number 30 on both sides of the state line. The highway was re-numbered State Route 233 as part of a mass renumbering of Nevada state routes. The 1978 edition of the official Nevada Department of Transportation state highway map was the first to show both numbers, with the 1982 edition the first to use only the 233 designation.

== Major intersections ==
The entire route is in Elko County.

Location	mi	km	Destinations	Notes
Oasis	0.000	0.000	Unnamed road south – Big Springs	Dirt road continuation beyond southern terminus
Oasis	0.000	0.000	I-80 west – Wells I-80 east – Wendover	Southern terminus; Diamond interchange Exit 378
	34.256	55.130	Utah state line	Northern terminus
	34.256	55.130	SR-30 east – Snowville	Continuation beyond northern terminus
1.000 mi = 1.609 km; 1.000 km = 0.621 mi

== See also ==
- List of state highways in Nevada
