= Thornton Carle Fry =

Thornton Carle Fry (7 January 1892, Findlay, Ohio – 1 January 1991) was an applied mathematician, known for his two widely-used textbooks, Probability and its engineering uses (1928) and Elementary differential equations (1929).

== Career ==
Thornton C. Fry received his bachelor's degree from Findlay College in 1912 and then pursued graduate study in Wisconsin in mathematics, physics, and astronomy. He received his M.A. in 1913 and his Ph.D. in 1920 in applied mathematics from the University of Wisconsin-Madison with thesis under the supervision of Charles S. Slichter.

Fry was employed as an industrial mathematician by Western Electric Company from 1916 to 1924 and then by Bell Telephone Laboratories (Bell Labs), which was half-owned by Western Electric. He headed a corporate division for industrial applications of mathematics and statistics and was involved in research and development for the U.S. federal government in both world wars.

After retiring (due to reaching the mandatory retirement age) from Bell Labs in 1956, he was hired by William Norris as a Senior Consultant for the UNIVAC division of Sperry Rand. He would subsequently be appointed as Vice-President head of the UNIVAC Division over Norris in April 1957. After retiring from Sperry-Rand in 1961 he worked as a consultant with Boeing Scientific Research Labs and also, during the 1960s, with Walter Orr Roberts, director of the National Center for Atmospheric Research.

In 1924 Fry was an Invited Speaker of the International Congress of Mathematicians in Toronto. In 1982 the Mathematical Association of America (MAA) gave him the MAA's distinguished service award.

== Selected publications ==
- Fry, Thornton C. (1916). "The graphical computation of transit factors". Popular Astronomy. 24: 17–21. Bibcode:1916PA.....24...17F.
- Fry, Thornton C. (1916). "Graphical solution of the position of a body in an elliptic orbit". The Astronomical Journal. 29: 141–146. Bibcode:1916AJ.....29..141F. doi:10.1086/104144.
- Fry, Thornton C. (1919). "The solution of circuit problems. Mathematical methods of investigation resulting from the application of Fourier's integral". Physical Review. 14 (2): 115–136. Bibcode:1919PhRv...14..115F. doi:10.1103/physrev.14.115.
- with R. V. L. Hartley: Hartley, R. V. L.; Fry, Thornton C. (1921). "The binaural location of pure tones". Physical Review. 18 (6): 431–442. Bibcode:1921PhRv...18..431H. doi:10.1103/PhysRev.18.431.
- with R. V. L. Hartley: Hartley, R. V. L.; Fry, Thornton C. (1922). "The binaural location of complex sounds". Bell Labs Technical Journal. 1 (2): 33–42. doi:10.1002/j.1538-7305.1922.tb00387.x.
- Fry, Thornton C. (1929). "The theory of the Schroteffekt". Journal of the Franklin Institute. 199 (2): 203–220. doi:10.1016/S0016-0032(25)91045-9.
- Fry, T. C. (1929). "The use of continued fractions in the design of electrical networks". Bull. Amer. Math. Soc. 35 (4): 463–498. doi:10.1090/S0002-9904-1929-04747-5.
- Fry, Thornton C. (1929). "Differential equations as a foundation for electrical circuit theory". The American Mathematical Monthly. 36 (10): 499–504. doi:10.1080/00029890.1929.11987013. JSTOR 2299959.
- Fry, Thornton C. (1932). "Two problems in potential theory". The American Mathematical Monthly. 39 (4): 199–209. doi:10.2307/2300663. JSTOR 2300663.
- with John R. Carson: Carson, John R.; Fry, Thornton C. (1937). "Variable frequency electric circuit theory with an application to the theory of frequency-modulation". Bell Labs Technical Journal. 16 (4): 513–540. doi:10.1002/j.1538-7305.1937.tb00766.x.
- Fry, Thornton C. (1937). "The semicentennial celebration of the American Mathematical Society—September 6–9, 1938". Bulletin of the American Mathematical Society. 43 (9): 593–594. doi:10.1090/S0002-9904-1937-06580-3.
- Fry, Thornton C. (1938). "The χ^{2}-test of significance". Journal of the American Statistical Association. 33 (203): 513–525. doi:10.1080/01621459.1938.10502328.
- "Industrial Mathematics by Thornton C. Fry, Mathematical Research Director, Bell Telephone Laboratories, New York, NY". In: Research—A National Resource. II. Industrial Research, Report of the National Resource Council to the National Resources Planning Board, December 1940. Washington, DC: U. S. Government Printing Office. 1941. pp. 268–288.
- Fry, Thornton C. (1941). "Industrial mathematics". Bell Labs Technical Journal. 20 (3): 255–292. doi:10.1002/j.1538-7305.1941.tb03138.x.
- Fry, Thornton C. (1945). "Some numerical methods for locating roots of polynomials" (PDF). Quarterly of Applied Mathematics. 3 (2): 89–105. doi:10.1090/qam/12910.
- Fry, Thornton C. (1956). "Mathematics as a profession today in industry". The American Mathematical Monthly. 63 (2): 71–80. doi:10.2307/2306427. JSTOR 2306427.
- Fry, T. C. (1964). "Mathematicians in industry—the first 75 years". Science. 143 (3609): 934–938. Bibcode:1964Sci...143..934F. doi:10.1126/science.143.3609.934. JSTOR 1712826. PMID 17743925.

== Patents ==
- "System for determining the direction of propagation of wave energy." U.S. Patent 1,502,243, issued July 22, 1924.
- "Harmonic analyzer." U.S. Patent 1,503,824, issued August 5, 1924.
- "Filtering circuit." U.S. Patent 1,559,864, issued November 3, 1925.
