= Tippetts =

Tippetts is a surname. Notable people with the surname include:

- Dylan Tippetts (born 2000), British Liberal Democrats politician
- John Tippetts (1622–1692), British shipbuilder and harbour designer
- Julie Tippetts (born 1947), English singer and actress
- Katherine Bell Tippetts (1865–1950), American conservationist
- Scott Tippetts (fl. from 2026), American politician
- Valeen Tippetts Avery (1936–2006), American biographer and historian

== See also ==
- Tippett
