= Oasis, Nevada =

- Census-designated place
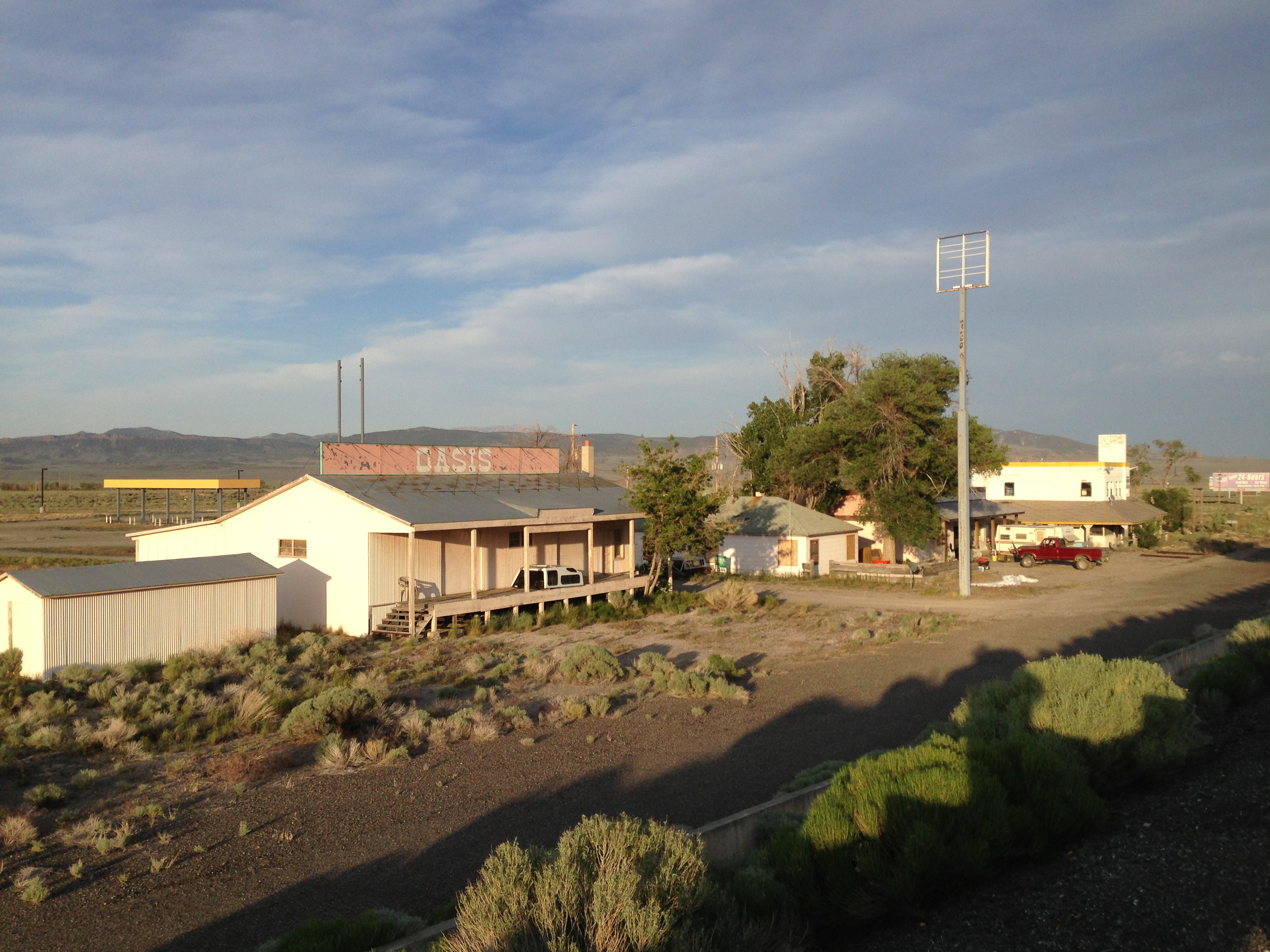

- Location within the state of Nevada
- Coordinates: 41°01′43″N 114°28′35″W
- Country: United States
- State: Nevada
- County: Elko

Area
  - Total: 0.89 sq mi (2.31 km^{2})
  - Land: 0.89 sq mi (2.31 km^{2})
  - Water: 0 sq mi (0.00 km^{2})
- Elevation: 5,843 ft (1,781 m)

Population (2020)
  - Total: 4
  - Density: 4.5/sq mi (1.73/km^{2})
- Time zone: UTC-8 (Pacific (PST))
  - Summer (DST): UTC-7 (PDT)
- ZIP code: 89835
- Area code: 775
- FIPS code: 32-52200
- GNIS feature ID: 2583946

Oasis is a census-designated place (CDP) located in eastern Elko County, Nevada, United States, at the junction of State Route 233 and Interstate 80, 31 miles (50 km) northwest of the Utah border and 77 miles (124 km) east of Elko. As of the 2020 census, Oasis had a population of 4.

== Description ==
Oasis is a high desert community located in the Goshute Valley between the Pequop Mountains and the Toano Range at an elevation of approximately 5,870 feet (1,790 m).

Oasis is named for the Oasis Ranch, which in the late 1880s was owned by E. C. Hardy.

The community is part of the Elko Micropolitan Statistical Area.

== Climate ==
Climate data for Oasis, Nevada, 1991–2020 normals, 1987-2020 extremes: 5835ft (1779m)
Month	Jan	Feb	Mar	Apr	May	Jun	Jul	Aug	Sep	Oct	Nov	Dec	Year
Record high °F (°C)	62 (17)	63 (17)	76 (24)	86 (30)	93 (34)	96 (36)	104 (40)	101 (38)	92 (33)	88 (31)	71 (22)	64 (18)	104 (40)
Mean maximum °F (°C)	50 (10)	54 (12)	66 (19)	75 (24)	83 (28)	91 (33)	97 (36)	94 (34)	88 (31)	80 (27)	64 (18)	53 (12)	97 (36)
Mean daily maximum °F (°C)	36.9 (2.7)	41.2 (5.1)	49.9 (9.9)	56.6 (13.7)	66.6 (19.2)	78.2 (25.7)	88.8 (31.6)	86.7 (30.4)	76.8 (24.9)	62.5 (16.9)	47.7 (8.7)	36.7 (2.6)	60.7 (16.0)
Daily mean °F (°C)	23.0 (−5.0)	28.2 (−2.1)	35.4 (1.9)	41.3 (5.2)	50.2 (10.1)	59.5 (15.3)	68.8 (20.4)	66.4 (19.1)	57.0 (13.9)	44.9 (7.2)	32.5 (0.3)	23.6 (−4.7)	44.2 (6.8)
Mean daily minimum °F (°C)	9.1 (−12.7)	15.2 (−9.3)	21.0 (−6.1)	25.9 (−3.4)	33.9 (1.1)	40.9 (4.9)	48.9 (9.4)	46.1 (7.8)	37.2 (2.9)	27.3 (−2.6)	17.4 (−8.1)	10.6 (−11.9)	27.8 (−2.3)
Mean minimum °F (°C)	−9 (−23)	−4 (−20)	8 (−13)	15 (−9)	21 (−6)	30 (−1)	39 (4)	37 (3)	25 (−4)	14 (−10)	1 (−17)	−9 (−23)	−14 (−26)
Record low °F (°C)	−26 (−32)	−24 (−31)	−7 (−22)	7 (−14)	12 (−11)	19 (−7)	30 (−1)	26 (−3)	12 (−11)	0 (−18)	−18 (−28)	−38 (−39)	−38 (−39)
Average precipitation inches (mm)	0.62 (16)	0.77 (20)	0.69 (18)	0.99 (25)	1.41 (36)	1.03 (26)	0.45 (11)	0.71 (18)	0.57 (14)	0.81 (21)	0.72 (18)	0.56 (14)	9.33 (237)
Average snowfall inches (cm)	6.60 (16.8)	6.20 (15.7)	2.80 (7.1)	2.60 (6.6)	0.30 (0.76)	0.00 (0.00)	0.00 (0.00)	0.00 (0.00)	0.00 (0.00)	0.30 (0.76)	3.20 (8.1)	4.50 (11.4)	26.5 (67.22)
Source 1: NOAA
Source 2: XMACIS2 (records)

== Demographics ==
Historical population
Census	Pop.	Note	%±
2020	4		—
U.S. Decennial Census

== See also ==
- List of census-designated places in Nevada
