= Pinehurst Court =

Coordinates: 51.5157°N 0.2029°W

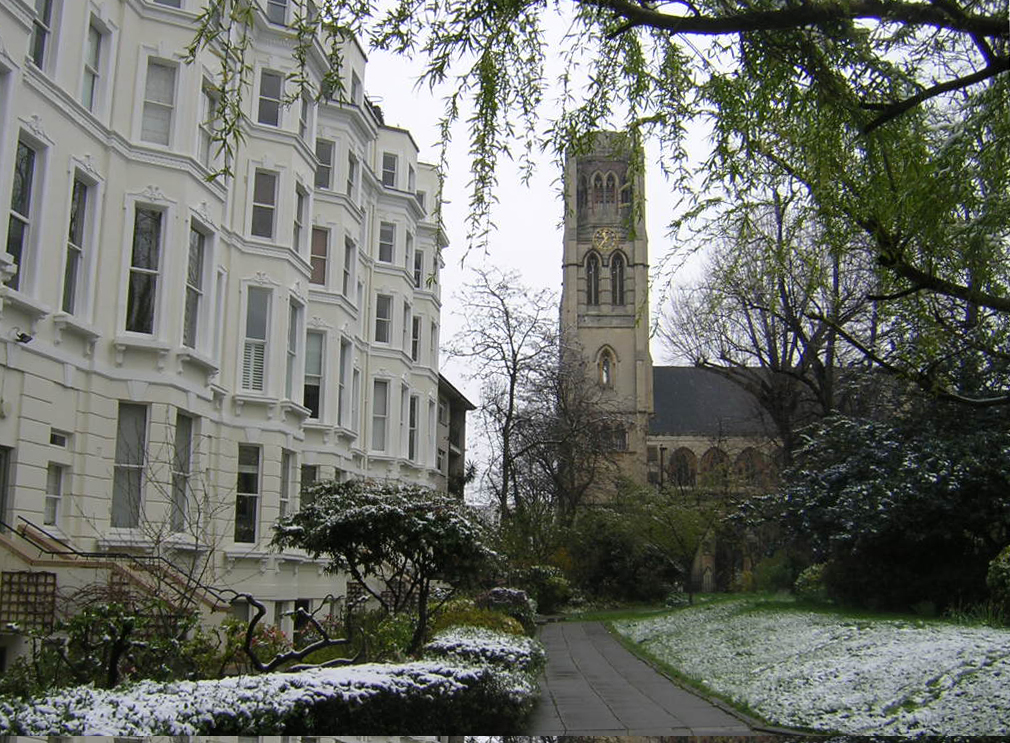
- Pinehurst Court, showing All Saints church in the background
- Alternative names: 1-3 Colville Gardens

General information
- Type: Mansion Block
- Architectural style: Victorian
- Location: Notting Hill, London, United Kingdom
- Construction started: c1870s
- Completed: c1870s

Technical details
- Structural system: Timber frame, brick, stucco.

Design and construction
- Architect: George Frederick Tippett
- Other designers: Builder: George Frederick Tippett

Pinehurst Court is a portered Victorian mansion block at 1-9 Colville Gardens, just off Colville Terrace and near the Portobello Market in Notting Hill, London, England. The terrace was initially built in the 1870s by the builder George Frederick Tippett, as single family residences, but from the 1880s the houses began to be subdivided into flats. By 1928 the neighbourhood was described as "rapidly becoming poorer", and by 1935 as a "largely slum area". The gentrification of Notting Hill in the 1980s and 1990s greatly improved the character of the building, which now forms a part of one of London's most fashionable neighbourhoods.

== History ==
=== 19th Century origins ===
The terrace was initially built in the 1870s by the builder George Frederick Tippett, who also developed much of the rest of the neighbourhood. Tippet was an entrepreneur who combined the roles of ground landlord, developer, builder "and probably architect as well". The gardens, however, were smaller than some earlier ornamental gardens in the neighbourhood. The 1973 Survey of London described the gardens at 1-3 Colville Gardens as being "a feeble imitation of the earlier and more spacious paddocks on the Ladbroke estate".

The houses were intended as single family homes for the well-to-do but from the beginning it proved difficult to attract wealthy buyers to the area, and as early as 1888 the buildings began to be subdivided into flats. In 1885 Tippett was declared bankrupt. He attributed his failure to "his inability to let a large portion of his property and to the pressure of secured creditors". Gradually the character of the buildings changed as wealthier tenants left the area. By 1888 two of Tippet's houses in Colville Gardens had already been subdivided into flats.

=== 1920s and 1930s ===
By 1928 the neighbourhood was described as "rapidly becoming poorer and more Jewish", and by 1935 as a "largely slum area... large houses turned into one-room tenements".

=== World War II ===
Further decline set in as many residents moved away during World War II to escape The Blitz. One of the buildings at the end of the terrace was destroyed during a bombing raid; it has since been rebuilt in the modern style. The same raid severely damaged other neighbouring buildings including All Saints Church.

=== 1950s ===
1–9 Colville Gardens was bought in 1953 by Fernbank Investments Ltd (a subsidiary of Davies Investments Ltd) for £8,000. Some questionable business practices followed, mostly involving attempts to displace sitting tenants (in some cases by intimidation) which however significantly increased the income from the property. At the same time the quality of the building deteriorated, and in around 1966 some of the residents began to approach the Council in order to attempt to improve living conditions.

=== 1960s ===
In 1967 Fernbank Investments declared bankruptcy. Its owner, Bowen Davies, took his own life, saying that he had "caused suffering... to very many, and the burden on my conscience is intolerable".

1–9 Colville Gardens was sold in October 1967 to another investment company, Trade and General Investments (Bahamas) Ltd, for £65,000. The building continued to deteriorate and in February 1969 it was again sold, this time to Cledro Developments for £120,000, whose Director Robert Gubay described conditions in the buildings as "truly terrible". In 1970 the block was sold to Crown Agents of Overseas territories, who renamed the building Trident House. The building was then again sold, changing hands several times before being purchased by Elkington's (PIF) Ltd in 1972 and renamed "Pinehurst Court". Elkington's began to invest in the building, selling off the flats on long leases, mostly to the occupying tenants.

=== Modern Revival ===
Over recent years the quality of the building gradually improved, reflecting the general revival of Notting Hill.

Today the building comprises around 105 one and two bedroom flats, mostly leased to private tenants on long leases of 100 years or more.

== See also ==
- All Saints Notting Hill
