= Goshute Canyon Wilderness =

Wilderness area in Nevada, United States

- IUCN category Ib (wilderness area)
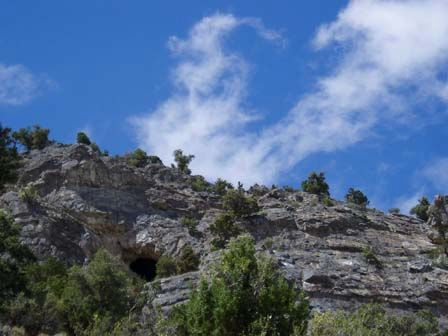
- Goshute Cave entrance in Goshute Canyon Wilderness

- Location within the United States
- Location: White Pine County, Nevada, United States
- Nearest city: McGill, Nevada
- Coordinates: 40.0520°N 114.8513°W
- Area: 42,544 acres (17,217 ha)
- Established: December 20, 2006
- Governing body: U.S. Bureau of Land Management

Goshute Canyon Wilderness is a 42,544-acre (17,217 ha) wilderness area in northern White Pine County in the U.S. state of Nevada. Located in the Cherry Creek Range north of the town of Mcgill, the Wilderness was created by the "White Pine County Conservation, Recreation and Development Act of 2006" and is administered by the U.S. Bureau of Land Management.

Vegetation in the Wilderness consists primarily of thick pinyon pine and juniper stands at the lower elevations, while bristlecone and limber pine thrive in the higher elevations. Aspen and cottonwood trees crowd the moist drainages along the creeks that flow through the Wilderness.

== Goshute Cave ==
Eroding natural limestone in the Cherry Creek Range has created Goshute Cave, an underground network of caves popular with cavers in the Wilderness.

== Wildlife ==
Various species of wildlife can be found in Goshute Canyon Wilderness, including Bonneville cutthroat trout, mule deer, mountain lion, bobcat, owl, falcon, eagle, hawk, kestrel, blue grouse, sage grouse, and marmot.

== Recreation ==
Popular recreational activities in Goshute Canyon Wilderness include camping, hiking, hunting, fishing, and caving.

== See also ==
- List of wilderness areas in Nevada
- List of U.S. Wilderness Areas
- Wilderness Act
