= Burmis Tree =

Dead limber pine landmark in Burmis, Alberta

Coordinates: 49°33′24.636″N 114°19′53.00″W

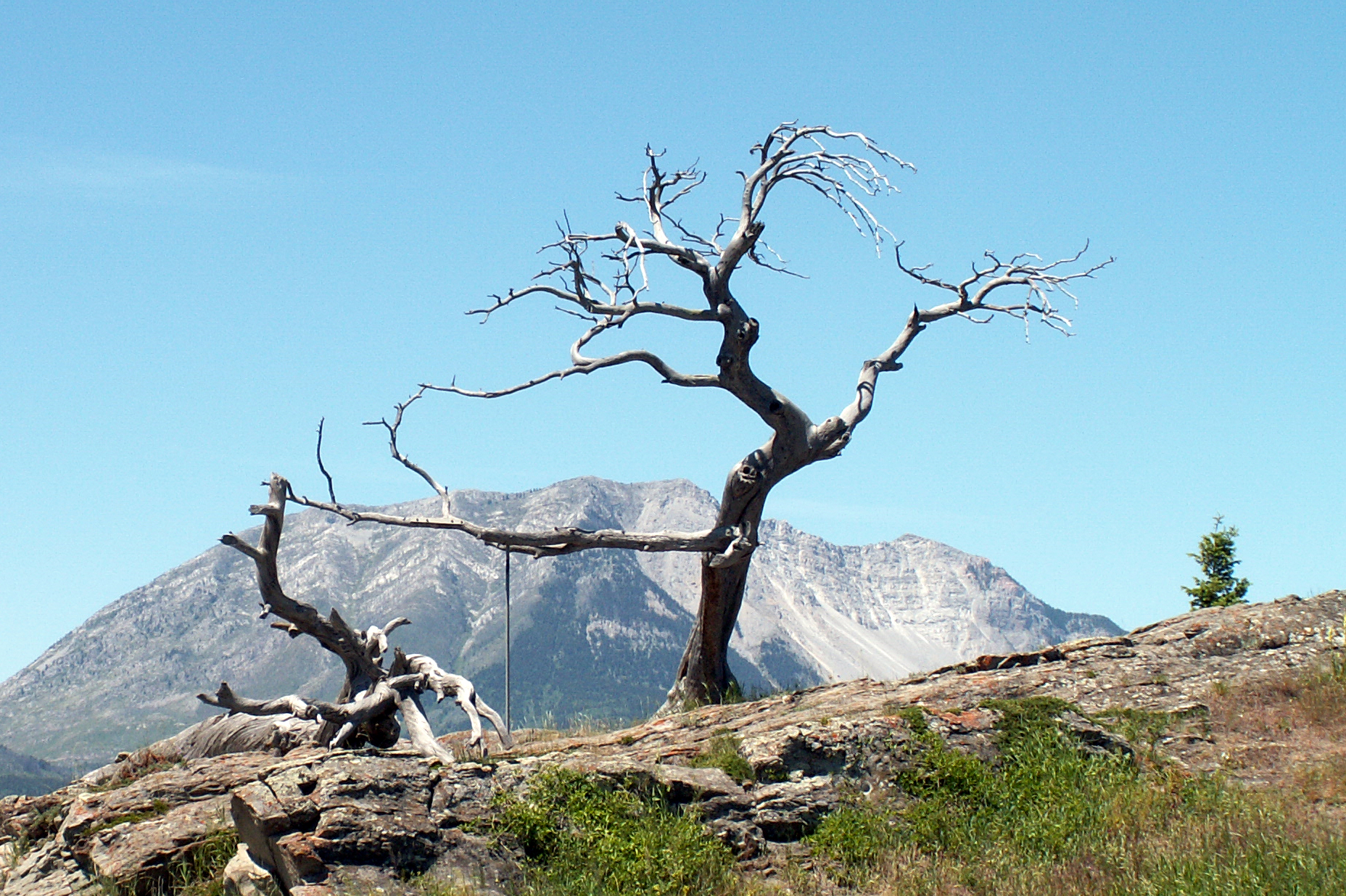
The Burmis Tree

The Burmis Tree (also known as the Burmisanu) is a dead limber pine tree located in the community of Burmis, Alberta, Canada, along the Crowsnest Highway (Highway 3) and east of municipality of Crowsnest Pass.

The tree died in the late 1970s after losing its needles. Limber trees are known to survive harsh conditions and are one of the longest living trees in Alberta. The Burmis Tree was estimated to be between 600 and 750 years old. In 1998, it was toppled by wind, however members of the local community refused to leave it lying. The tree was stabilized by Alberta Culture, Historic Sites staff using stainless steel rods and brackets. In 2004, vandals cut one of the tree's main branches. Locals fixed it again with glue and a prop pole. The community rallied to have the new Highway 3 built around the tree rather than destroy the heritage symbol it has become. The tree remains as the sole point of interest in the once prosperous town of Burmis.

== See also ==
- List of individual trees
