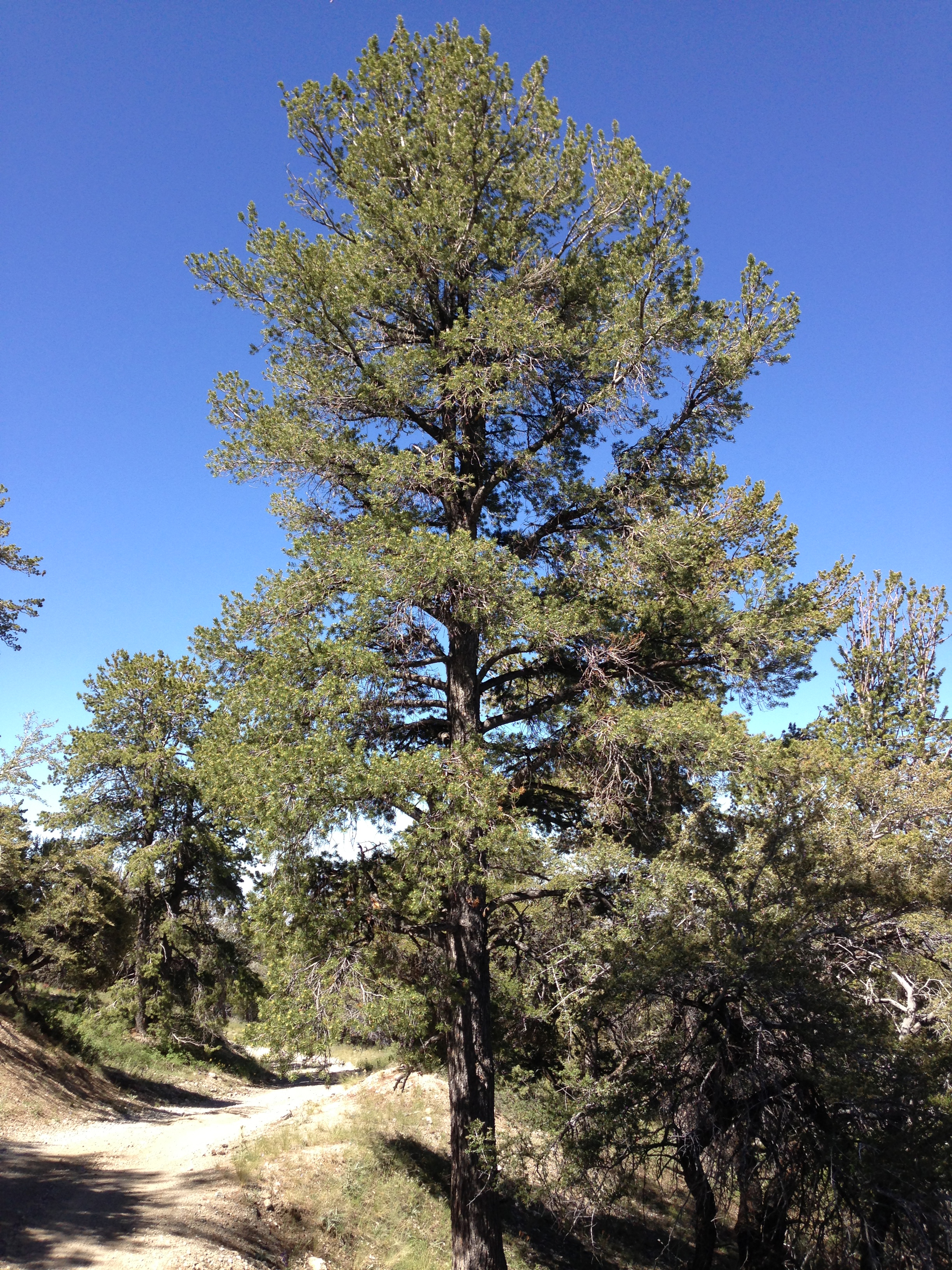
- Limber pine on Spruce Mountain, Nevada

Conservation status
- Least Concern (IUCN 3.1)

- Apparently Secure (NatureServe)

Scientific classification
- Kingdom: Plantae
- Clade: Tracheophytes
- Clade: Gymnosperms
- Division: Pinophyta
- Class: Pinopsida
- Order: Pinales
- Family: Pinaceae
- Genus: Pinus
- Subgenus: P. subg. Strobus
- Section: P. sect. Quinquefoliae
- Subsection: P. subsect. Strobus
- Species: P. flexilis

Binomial name
- Pinus flexilis E.James, 1824
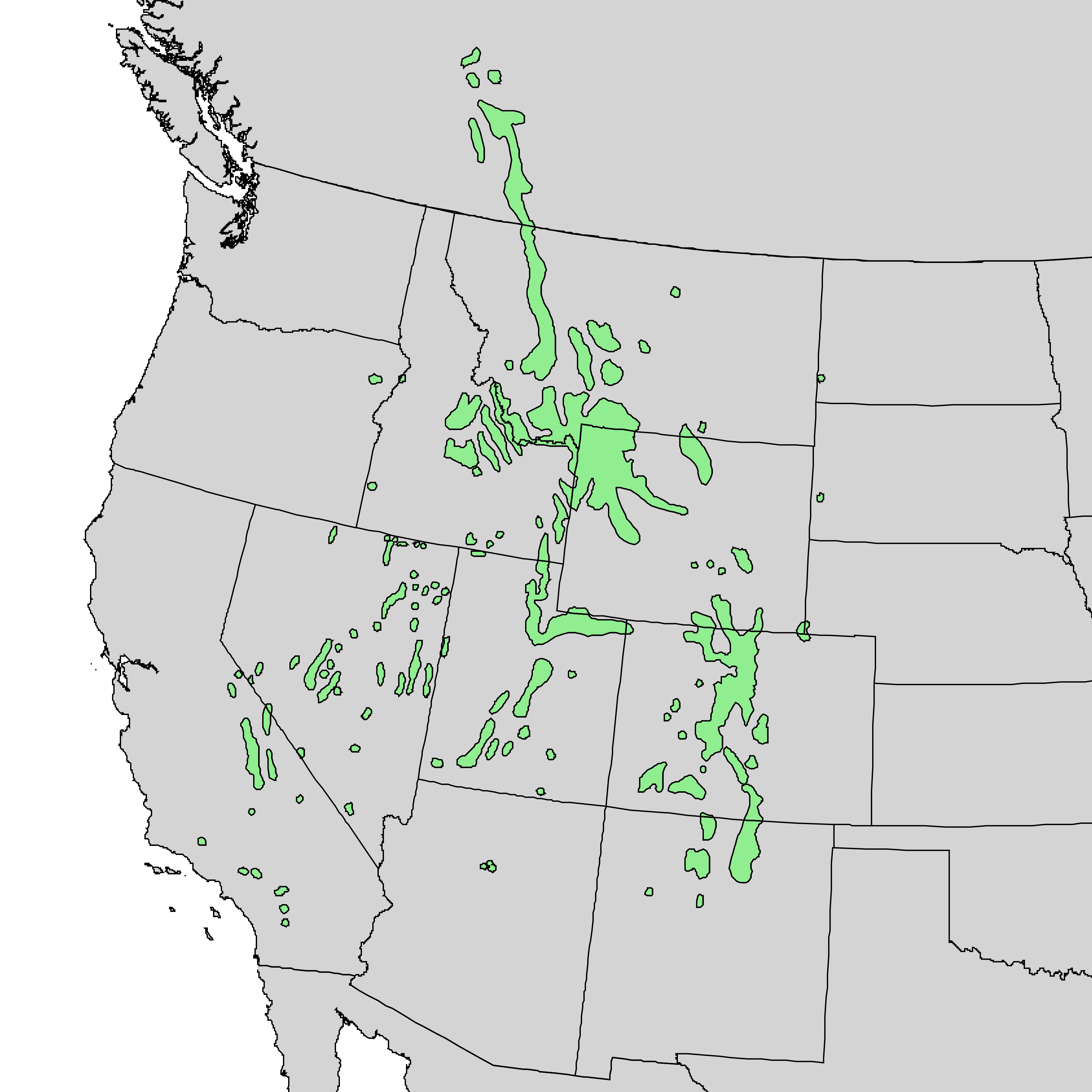
- Natural range

Synonyms
- Apinus flexilis (E.James) Rydb. (1905); Pinus cembra var. flexilis (E.James) F.Sanders (1874); Pinus lambertiana var. brevifolia Hook. (1838); Pinus novaemexicana P.Landry (1989)

= Pinus flexilis =

Limber pine

North American species of pine tree

Pinus flexilis, the limber pine, is a species of pine tree in the family Pinaceae that occurs in the mountains of the Western United States, Mexico, and Canada. It is also called Rocky Mountain white pine.

A limber pine in Eagle Cap Wilderness, Oregon, has been documented as over 2,000 years old, and another one was confirmed at 1,140 years old. Another candidate for the oldest limber pine was identified in 2006 near the Alta Ski Area in Utah; called "Twister", the tree was confirmed to be at least 1,700 years old and thought to be even older.

== Description ==
Its pliant branches gives it the common name "limber" and specific epithet flexilis. Its needles are about 8 centimeters (3 1/4 in) long and a dark, blueish green. Its bark is heavily creased and dark grey. Its pale wood is lightweight and soft.

Pinus flexilis is typically a high-elevation pine, often marking the tree line either on its own, or with whitebark pine (Pinus albicaulis), either of the bristlecone pines, or lodgepole pine (Pinus contorta). In favorable conditions, it makes a tree to 20 metres (65 feet), rarely 25 m (80 ft) tall. On exposed tree line sites, mature trees are much smaller, reaching heights of only 5–10 m (15–35 ft). In steeply-sloping, rocky, and windswept terrain in the Rocky Mountains of southern Alberta, limber pine is even more stunted, occurring in old stands where mature trees are consistently less than 3 m (10 ft) in height.

One of the world's oldest living limber pine trees grows on the banks of the upper North Saskatchewan River at Whirlpool Point in Alberta. Recent measurements give a maximum girth of 185". In 1986, a core sample 10 cm was retrieved by two researchers who counted 400 rings. Extrapolating this data gives an age close to 3,000 years.

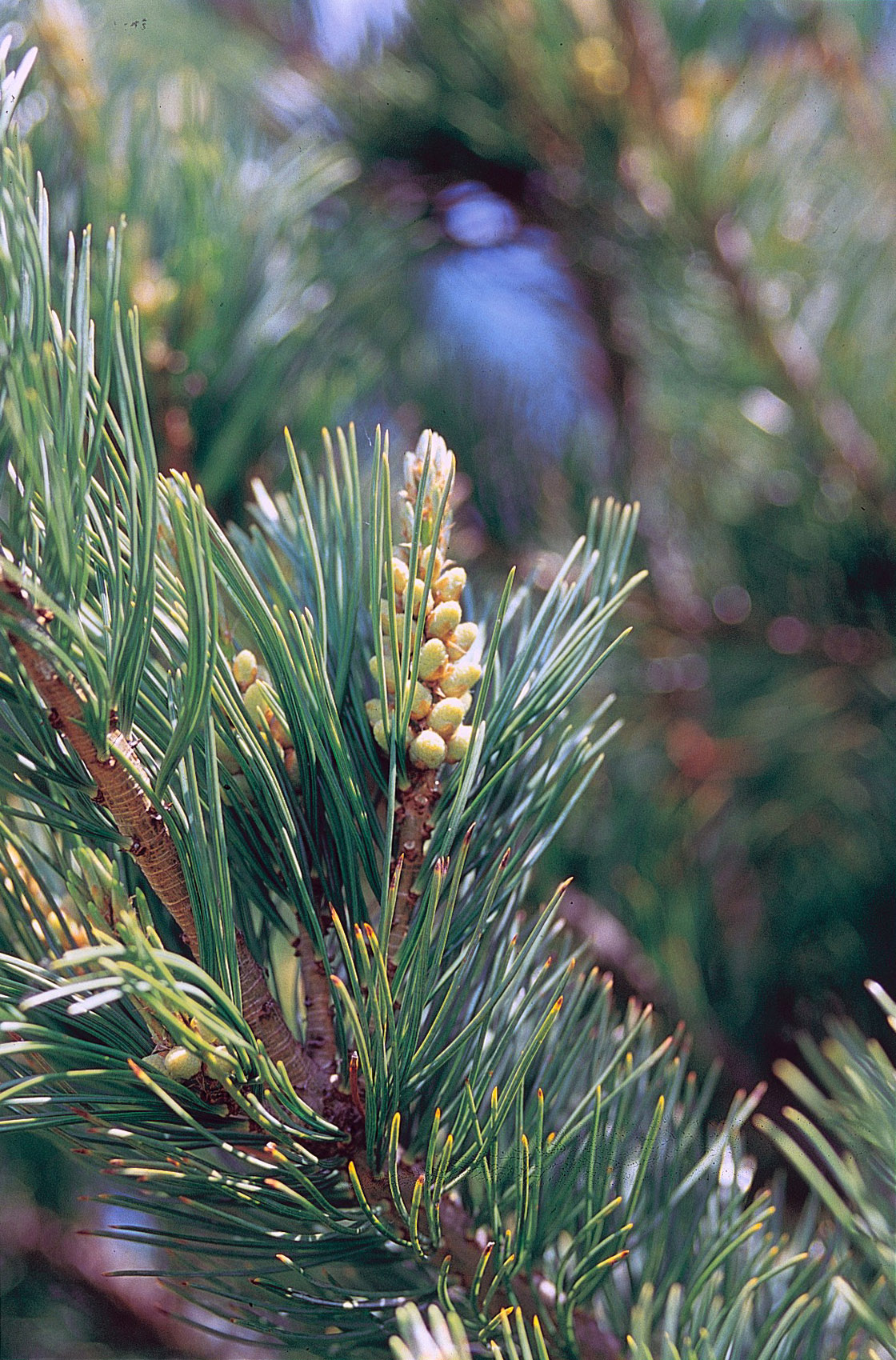
Male cones of a limber pine, eastern Sierra Nevada, California

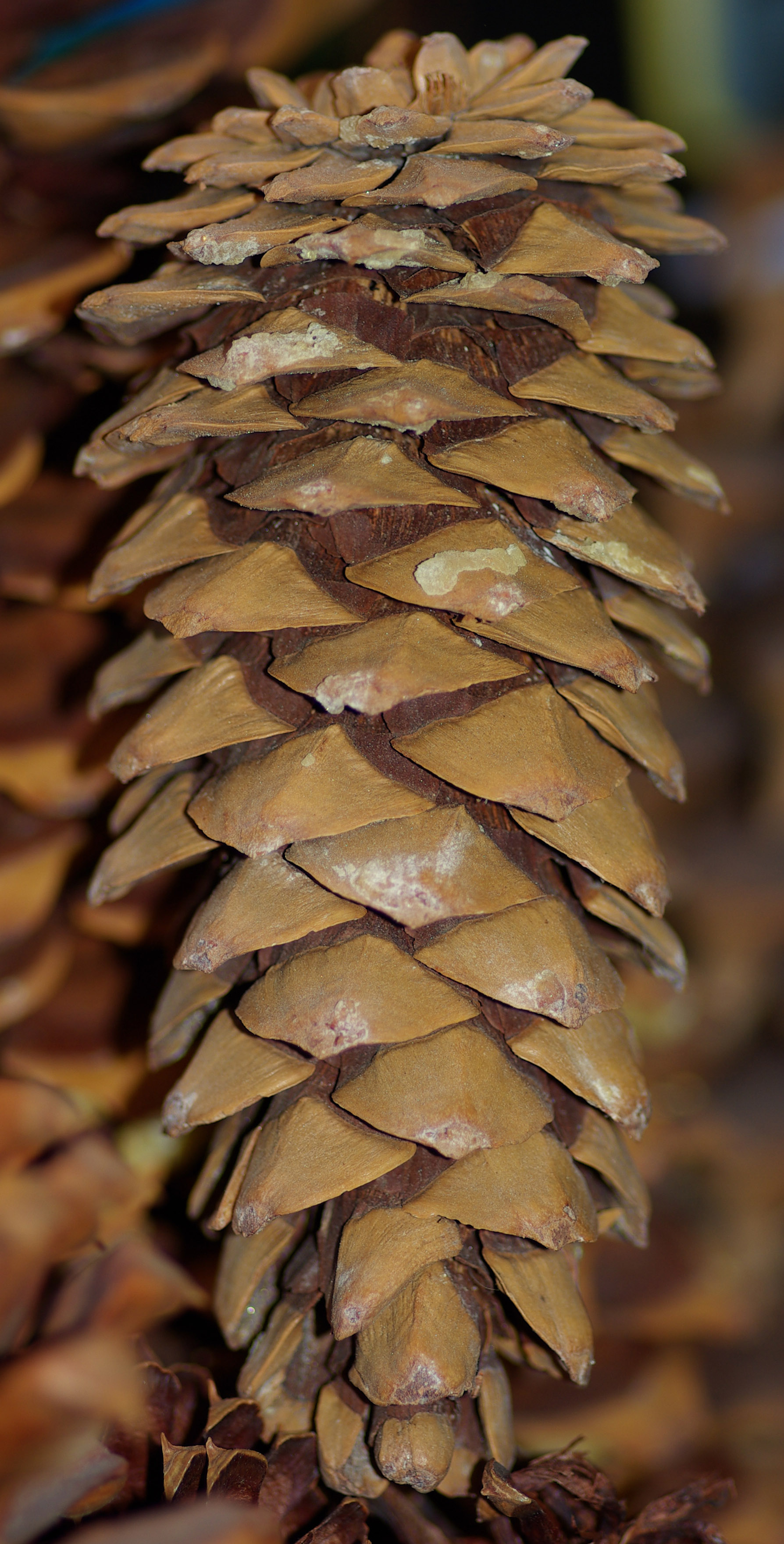
Limber pine cone from San Jacinto Mountains

=== Similar species ===
Pinus flexilis is a member of the white pine group, Pinus subgenus Strobus, and like all members of that group, the leaves ('needles') are in fascicles (bundles) of five, with a deciduous sheath. This distinguishes it from the lodgepole pine, with two needles per fascicle, and the bristlecone pines, which share five needles per fascicle but have a semi-persistent sheath.

==== Pinus albicaulis ====
Distinguishing limber pine from the related whitebark pine (P. albicaulis), also a white pine, is more difficult, and can only easily be done by the cones. In limber pine, the cones are 6–15 cm (2 1/4–6 in) long where the species overlap, green when immature, and open to release the seeds; the scales are not fragile. In whitebark pine, the cones are 4–7 cm (1 1/2–2 3/4 in) long, dark purple when immature, and do not open on drying, but are fragile and are pulled apart by birds to release the seeds. A useful clue is that whitebark pines almost never have intact old cones lying under them, whereas limber pines usually do.

==== Pinus monticola ====
In the absence of cones, limber pine can also be hard to tell from Western white pine (P. monticola) where they occur together in the northern Rockies and the Sierra Nevada east slope. The most useful clue here is that limber pine needles are entire (smooth when rubbed gently in both directions), whereas Western white pine needles are finely serrated (feeling rough when rubbed gently from tip to base). Limber pine needles are also usually shorter, 4–7 cm (1 1/2–2 3/4 in) long, while western white pine needles are 5–10 cm (2–4 in), although these ranges overlap.

== Distribution ==
The largest part of the limber pine's range is in the Rocky Mountains, from southwest Alberta and southeastern British Columbia south through Colorado and New Mexico into the northern states of Mexico. It is also found through the Great Basin states of Nevada and Utah, in the eastern Sierra Nevada and White Mountains of Northern California, and in the San Bernardino and San Gabriel Mountains of the Transverse Ranges in Southern California. Continuing south the species is found in the San Jacinto Mountains, Santa Rosa Mountains, and Hot Springs Mountain of the Peninsular Ranges. There are small disjunct populations in eastern Oregon, in western North Dakota and Nebraska, and in the Black Hills of South Dakota. It is found at a wide range of altitudes depending on the latitude, from 850 to 3,810 m (2,790 to 12,500 ft). In the northern half of its range, it grows in the montane zone near the lower tree line; in the middle of its range between the 45th and 40th parallels, it grows on windswept sites in the montane and subalpine zones; and in the southern part of its range, it grows mainly at high elevations in the subalpine zone near the upper tree line. It can more often be found at the outer fringes of a forest than in the forest itself.

== Ecology ==
Pinus flexilis is an important source of food for several species, including red squirrels and Clark's nutcrackers, the latter being an important distributor of seeds. There is evidence that limber pines co-evolved with Clark's nutcrackers, which are the primary dispersers of the seeds. In a relic, low elevation population, seeds are also dispersed by small rodents. American black bears and grizzly bears may raid squirrel caches for limber pine nuts. Squirrels, Northern flickers, and mountain bluebirds often nest in the trees. There is some evidence that P. flexilis has a symbiotic relationship with nitrogen-fixing bacteria that inhabit the needles.

The species is generally shade tolerant and resistant to fire, but does not thrive in dense habitats, instead occurring in areas relatively hostile to other species.

=== Threats ===
Limber pine is susceptible to white pine blister rust, caused by Cronartium ribicola, a fungus that was introduced accidentally from Europe. Limber pine mortality is high in many areas throughout its range, except Arizona, where it has not yet been found. However, there is little hope of controlling the blister rust in existing trees. Research is under way, locating and breeding from the occasional naturally resistant limber pines, and by studying the resistance mechanisms of the European and Asian white pines (e.g. Swiss pine, Macedonian pine), which are strongly resistant to the disease.

The tree has also been damaged by bark beetle epidemics, particularly at drought-affected low elevations.

== Cultivation ==
The popular cultivar P. flexilis 'Vanderwolf's Pyramid' is widely available as an ornamental tree for gardens. 'Vanderwolf's Pyramid' derives from P. reflexa, though it is usually listed in nursery catalogs under P. flexilis.

The Southwestern white pine is popular as a windbreak tree or an ornamental tree due to its drought tolerance. It is also grown as a Christmas tree, liked for the soft needles but with stiffer branches than an Eastern white pine.

== Uses ==
The large seeds are edible, and were reportedly consumed by Native Americans in Montana.

== See also ==
- Burmis Tree
