= Antelope Range (White Pine County, Nevada) =

Mountain range in Nevada, United States

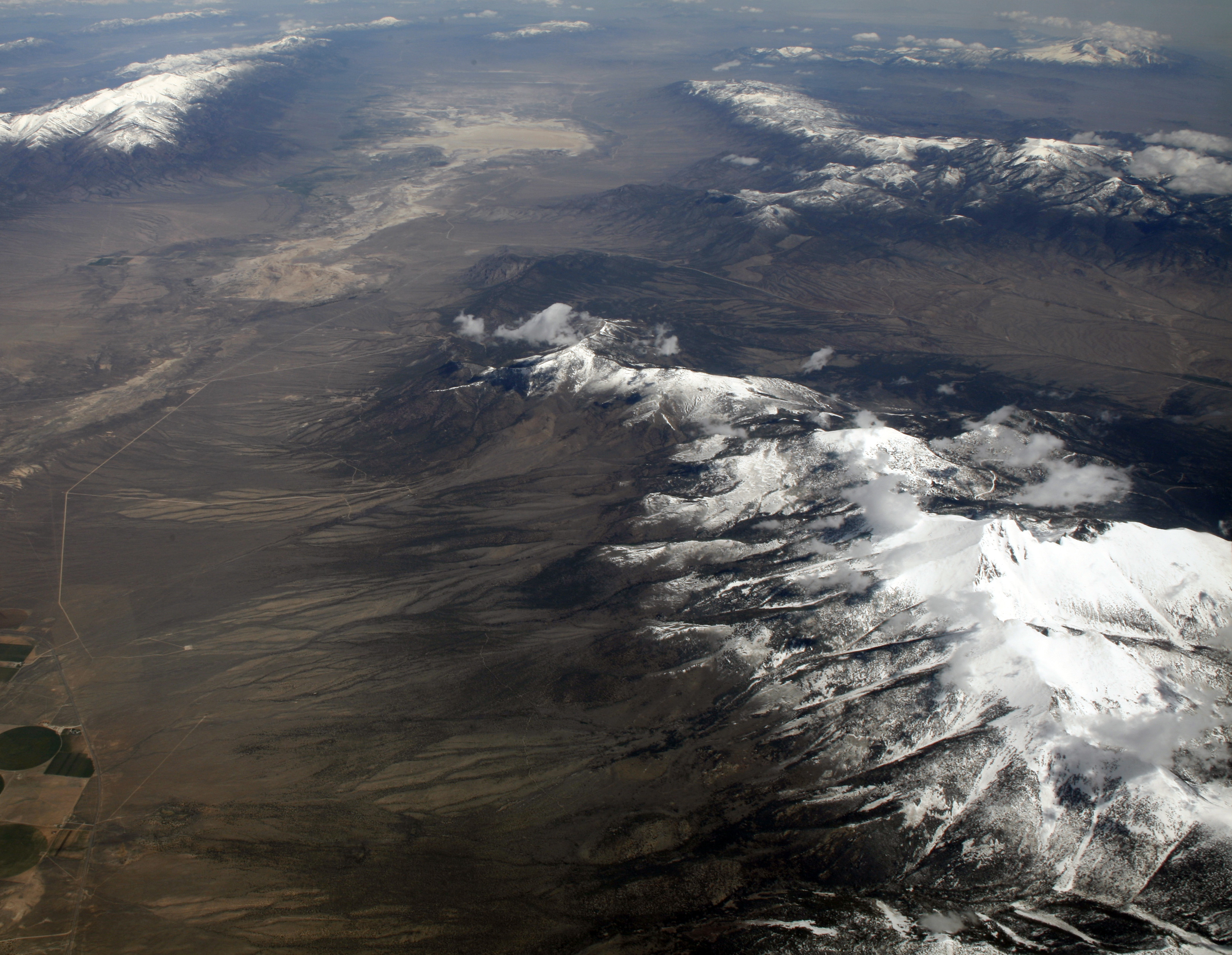
- Bifurcated Antelope Range, upper left (origins of Spring Valley in the split on south of range-Antelope Valley playas-(south region) visible)

Highest point
- Elevation: 2,770 m (9,090 ft)

Geography
- Location within Nevada
- Country: United States
- State: Nevada
- District: Elko/White Pine County
- Range coordinates: 39°57′53.768″N 114°24′3.052″W
- Topo map: USGS Baldy Peak

The Antelope Range is a mountain range in Elko and White Pine counties, Nevada.

The range was named for the wild antelope which roamed the area.
