= Delano, Nevada =

Ghost town in Elko County, Nevada, United Statses

- Ghost town
- Location within the state of Nevada Delano (the United States)
- Coordinates: 41°40′04″N 114°16′25″W
- Country: United States
- State: Nevada
- County: Elko
- Elevation: 6,398 ft (1,950 m)
- Time zone: UTC-8 (Pacific (PST))
  - Summer (DST): UTC-7 (PDT)
- GNIS feature ID: 854719

Delano is a ghost town in northeastern Elk County, Nevada, United States, about 36 miles (58 km) north of Montello.

== Description ==
Site of the former ghost town of Delano, June 2009

Delano was the center of a small gold-mining district that saw production from the 1870s to the 1960s. The post office closed in 1927. The community has the name of a local trapper.

The remaining buildings at Delano were destroyed by a wildfire in the 1990s, and only archaeological remains survive at the site today.

== Geography ==
Delano is at an elevation of 6,401 feet (1,951 m).

== See also ==
- List of ghost towns in Nevada
