= Ralph Hartley =

American electronics researcher (1888–1970)

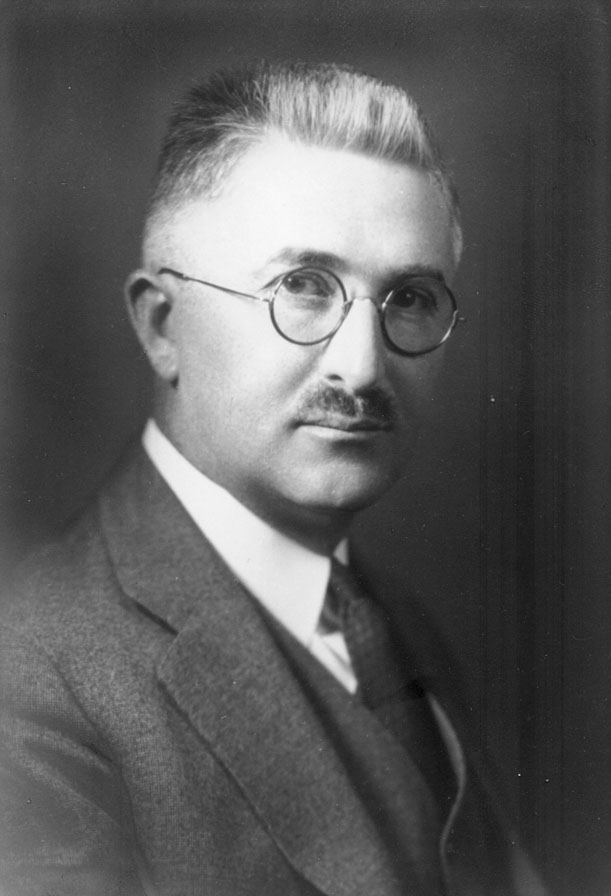
- Born: November 30, 1888; Sprucemont, Nevada, U.S.
- Died: May 1, 1970 (aged 81); Summit, New Jersey, U.S.
- Education: University of Utah; Oxford University
- Known for: Hartley function Hartley modulator Hartley oscillator Hartley transform Shannon–Hartley theorem
- Awards: IEEE Medal of Honor (1946)
- Scientific career
- Fields: Electrical engineering

Ralph Vinton Lyon Hartley (November 30, 1888 – May 1, 1970) was an American electronics researcher. He invented the Hartley oscillator and the Hartley transform, and contributed to the foundations of information theory.

His legacy includes the naming of the hartley, a unit of information equal to one decimal digit, after him.

== Biography ==
Hartley was born in Sprucemont, Nevada, and attended the University of Utah, receiving an A.B. degree in 1909. He became a Rhodes Scholar at St Johns, Oxford University, in 1910 and received a B.A. degree in 1912 and a B.Sc. degree in 1913. He married Florence Vail of Brooklyn on March 21, 1916. The Hartleys had no children.

He returned to the United States and was employed at the Research Laboratory of the Western Electric Company. In 1915 he was in charge of radio receiver development for the Bell System transatlantic radiotelephone tests. For this he developed the Hartley oscillator and also a neutralizing circuit to eliminate triode singing resulting from internal coupling. A patent for the oscillator was filed on June 1, 1915 and awarded on October 26, 1920.

During World War I Hartley established the principles that led to sound-type directional finders.

Following the war he returned to Western Electric, whose research division later became Bell Laboratories. He performed research on repeaters and voice and carrier transmission and formulated the law "that the total amount of information that can be transmitted is proportional to frequency range transmitted and the time of the transmission." His 1928 paper is considered "the single most important prerequisite" for Shannon's theory of information.

Hartley formed a theoretical and experimental research group at Bell Laboratories starting in 1929 to investigate nonlinear oscillations and what later became known as parametric amplifiers. This research was mostly parallel to the work being done at the same time in Soviet Russia by Leonid Mandelstam and in Europe by Balthasar van der Pol. A short review and extensive bibliography was published by Mumford in 1960. The Bell Laboratories work was carried on under Hartley's guidance during the 1930s and 1940s by John Burton and Eugene Peterson (who themselves had begun investigations of nonlinear circuits as far back as 1917 when they had observed unusual characteristics while working with E.F.W. Alexanderson's magnetic modulators, an early form of magnetic amplifier). Peterson later got John Manley and Harrison Rowe involved in this line of research during the 1940s which culminated in the now famous Manley–Rowe relations and several papers by the latter two authors on the topic of parametric circuits in the mid 1950s.

During World War II he was particularly involved with servomechanism problems.

He retired from Bell Labs in 1950 and died on May 1, 1970.

== Awards ==
- IRE Medal of Honor, 1946, for his oscillator and information proportionality law. This was an award from the Institute of Radio Engineers which later merged into the Institute of Electrical and Electronics Engineers; the award became the IEEE Medal of Honor.
- Fellow of the American Association for the Advancement of Science

== Publications ==
Probably incomplete.

- Hartley, R.V.L., "The Function of Phase Difference in the Binaural Location of Pure Tones," Physical Review, Volume 13, Issue 6, pp 373–385, (June 1919).
- Hartley, R.V.L., Fry T.C.,"The Binaural Location of Pure Tones", Physical Review, Volume 18, Issue 6, pp 431 – 442, (December 1921).
- Hartley, R.V.L., "Relations of Carrier and Side-Bands in Radio Transmission", Proceedings of the IRE, Volume 11, Issue 1, pp 34 – 56, (February 1923).
- Hartley, R.V.L., "Transmission of Information", Bell System Technical Journal, Volume 7, Number 3, pp. 535–563, (July 1928).
- Hartley, R.V.L., "A Wave Mechanism of Quantum Phenomena", Physical Review, Volume 33, Issue 2, Page 289, (1929) (abstract only)
- Hartley, R.V.L., "Oscillations in Systems with Non-Linear Reactance", The Bell System Technical Journal, Volume 15, Number 3, pp 424 – 440, (July 1936).
- Hartley, R.V.L., "Excitation of Raman Spectra with the Aid of Optical Catalysers", Nature, Volume 139, pg 329 - 329, (20 February 1937)
- Hartley, R.V.L., "Steady State Delay as Related to Aperiodic Signals", Bell System Technical Journal, Volume 20, Number 2, pp 222 – 234, (April 1941).
- Hartley, R.V.L., "A More Symmetrical Fourier Analysis Applied to Transmission Problems," Proceedings of the IRE, Volume 30, Number 2, pp. 144–150 (March 1942).
- Hartley, R.V.L., "Note on the Application of Vector Analysis to the Wave Equation", Journal of the Acoustical Society of America, Volume 22, Issue 4, pg 511, (1950).
- Hartley, R.V.L., "The Significance of Nonclassical Statistics", Science, Volume 111, Number 2891, pp 574 – 576, (May 26, 1950)
- Hartley, R.V.L., "Matter, a Mode of Motion", Bell System Technical Journal, Volume 29, Number 3, pg 350 - 368, (July 1950).
- Hartley, R.V.L., "The Reflection of Diverging Waves by a Gyrostatic Medium", Bell System Technical Journal, Volume 29, Number 3, pp 369 – 389, (July 1950),
- Hartley, R.V.L., "A New System of Logarithmic Units", Proceedings of the IRE, Volume. 43, Number 1, pg 97, (January 1955).
- Hartley, R.V.L., "New System of Logarithmic Units", Journal of the Acoustical Society of America, Volume 27, Issue 1, pp 174 – 176, (1955)
- Hartley, R.V.L., "Information Theory of The Fourier Analysis and Wave Mechanics", August 10, 1955, publication information unknown.
- Hartley, R.V.L., "The Mass of a Wave Particle", July 30, 1955, unpublished manuscript, copies available from the Niels Bohr Library & Archives, American Institute of Physics, College Park MD
- Hartley, R.V.L., "The Mechanism of Gravitation", January 11, 1956, unpublished manuscript; copies available from the Niels Bohr Library & Archives, American Institute of Physics, College Park MD
- Hartley, R.V.L., "The Mechanism of Electricity and Magnetism", June 14, 1956, unpublished manuscript, copies available from the Niels Bohr Library & Archives, American Institute of Physics, College Park MD
- Hartley, R.V.L., "Rotational Waves in a Turbulent Liquid", Journal of the Acoustical Society of America, Volume 29, Issue 2, pp 195 – 196, (1957)
- Hartley, R.V.L., "A Mechanistic Theory of Extra-Atomic Physics", Philosophy of Science, Volume 26, Number 4, pp 295 – 309, (October 1959)

== See also ==
- cas (mathematics)
- Discrete Hartley transform
- Hartley (unit)
- Units of information
