= William Tippet =

William Henry Tippet (1782-1824) was the Judge and Magistrate of Patna, India, from 1816 to 1824.

== Biography ==
Tippet was born in Bombay on 21 November 1782. His father was Captain James Tippet, an artillery officer with the British East India Company, who met Tippet's mother, Mary Mason, when he was stationed on the South Atlantic island of St Helena (c. 1770-1778). The Masons were a prominent plantation family. In 1775, Tippet's father and grandfather, Benjamin Mason, had accommodated Captain James Cook, during his second visit to the island.

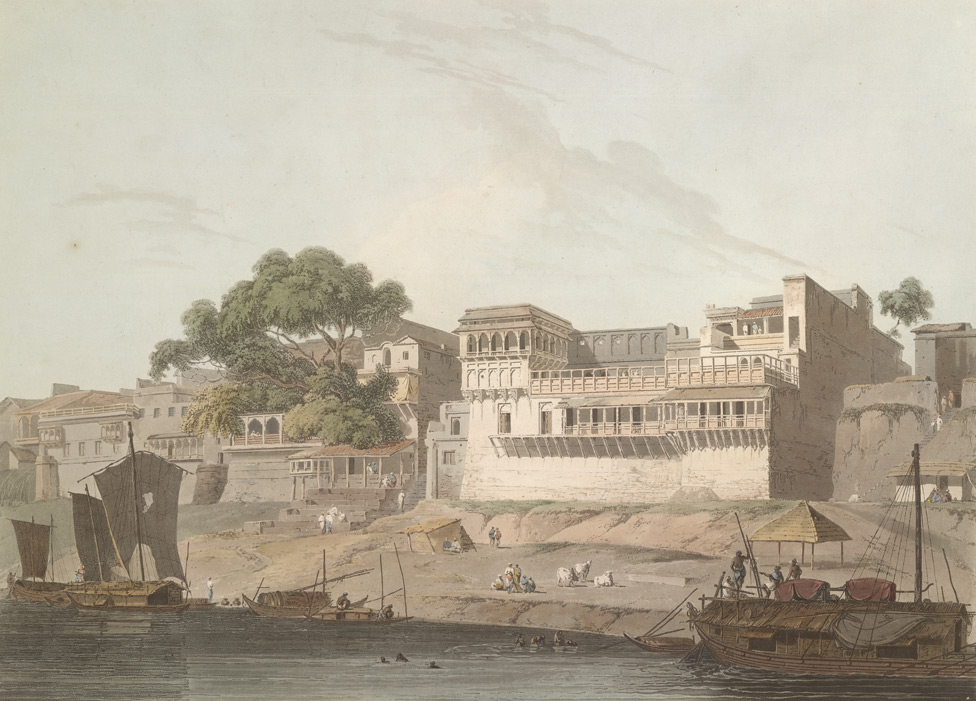
19th-century Patna

From an early age, Tippet pursued a career in the service of the East India Company. Aged 17 years, he served as a Cadet, then attained the ranks of Ensign (1799) and Lieutenant (1800), before leaving military service to take up a position with the Company as a Writer in Bengal in July 1803.

In the civil service wing of the British East India Company, Tippet served in a variety of junior judicial and administrative positions; first at Tirhoot, then in the Sadr Diwani Adalat (Supreme Court of Revenue), before becoming the Judge and Magistrate of Cawnpore in 1813. His jurisdiction was extended to include Ghazipur and Benares in 1815 and Murshidabad in 1816, before he was appointed Judge and Magistrate of the City of Patna.

As a Magistrate, Tippet was sympathetic to the protection and development of local economies and supported the legal interests of senior merchants of both European and Indian heritage.

Tippet died at sea, aged 41, aboard the Berwickshire, during a voyage to St Helena.
