= James Sterling Tippett =

American writer

James Sterling Tippett (September 7, 1885 in Memphis, Missouri – 1958) was an American educator and children's writer.

== Biography ==
At age five, in 1890, his family moved to a farm inherited from his maternal grandfather, and remained there until he was thirteen, when his family returned to Memphis. After graduating from high school, Tippett began teaching high school, and attended the University of Missouri during summer breaks.

Tippett moved to Nashville, Tennessee, in 1918 to become principal of Peabody Demonstration School. In 1922, he left to join the Lincoln School at Teachers College in New York as an instructor and special investigator. During this time, he began writing children's books. The Singing Farmer, his first book, was inspired by a classroom farm exhibit. It was published in 1927.

Tippett taught in Pennsylvania, Connecticut, and South Carolina, while continuing to write children's books and edit educational textbooks. His works include: I Live in a City (1927), I Go A-Traveling (1929), I Spend the Summer (1930), Busy Carpenters (1930), Toys and Toymakers (1931), A World to Know (1933), Henry and the Garden and Stories about Henry (1936), Shadow and the Stocking (1937), Sniff (1937), Counting the Days (1940), and Abraham Lincoln (1951), as well as a series called Understanding Science.

Tippett moved with his wife Martha to Chapel Hill, North Carolina, in 1939. There he served as a visiting professor of education at the University of North Carolina at Chapel Hill until his death in 1958. In 1972 his name was added to the North Carolina Educational Hall of Fame.

James S. Tippett's best known work is "Sunning", a poem about a dog lying in the summer sun that became required reading in many elementary schools. Thus his place as a historic poet in the world was secured.

Tippett's poem "The Park" is included, with permission, from Harper & Row, Publishers Inc., and World's Work Ltd., in a First Little Golden Book, My Little Book of POEMS, Western Publishing Company, Inc. Racine, Wisconsin 53404, (1983)
