= Tippett, Nevada =

Populated place in Nevada, United States

Coordinates: 39°52′07″N 114°20′59″W

Tippett is a populated place in White Pine County, Nevada, United States. It lies at an elevation of 5,692 feet (1,735 meters) in Antelope Valley, south of the Goshute Indian Reservation.

== History ==
Tippett was the location of a U. S. Post Office, from May 1896 to December 1913, then from June 1914 to June 1926. It was also located along the original 1913 alignment of the Lincoln Highway.
