= George Frederick Tippett =

George Frederick John Tippett (1828, Greater London – 21 July 1899) was an English builder and entrepreneur who developed much of the former St Quintin Estate in Notting Hill, London. He is responsible for the construction of many buildings in the area which remain today, including Pinehurst Court, a portered Victorian mansion block at 1-9 Colville Gardens in Notting Hill.

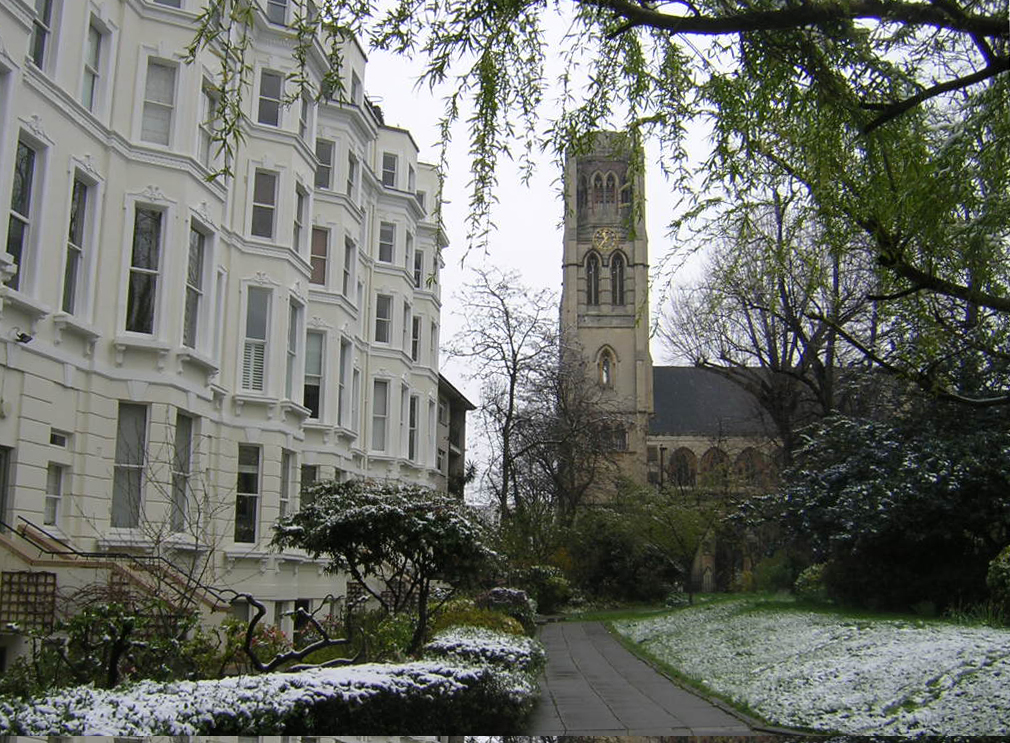
Pinehurst Court, one of Tippett's buildings in Notting Hill.

== Biography ==
Tippett was 31 years of age in 1860.

Tippett was active in the Paddington area in the 1860s, by now a wealthy builder who around this time was constructing a substantial number of sizeable terrace houses in Leinster Square, Prince's Square, and elsewhere in the vicinity of Paddington. Two of his relatives, Thomas Sheade Tippett and John Tippett assisted him with the development of his Kensington estate.

Tippett began to develop the former St Quintin Estate in the 1870s. The houses were intended as single family homes for the well-to-do but from the beginning it proved difficult to attract wealthy buyers to the area, and as early as 1888 many of his buildings began to be subdivided into flats.

In 1885 Tippett was declared bankrupt. He attributed his failure to "his inability to let a large portion of his property and to the pressure of secured creditors". Gradually the character of the buildings declined as wealthier tenants left the area.
