= Sprucemont, Nevada =

Elko County, Nevada ghost town

Coordinates: 40°33′02″N 114°52′20″W

Sprucemont is a ghost town in Elko County, in the U.S. state of Nevada. The GNIS classifies it as a populated place.

== History ==
The community took its name from nearby Spruce Mountain, as it is located on the western foothills of the mountain. Variant names were "Spruce City" and "Spruce Mount". A post office called Sprucemount was established in 1880, the name was changed to Spruce in 1895, the name was changed again to Sprucemont in 1929, and the post office was discontinued in 1935.

The population was 17 in 1940.

Ralph Vinton Lyon Hartley, pioneer of Information Theory, was born in Sprucemont, Nevada on November 30, 1888.

== See also ==
- List of ghost towns in Nevada
