= All Saints Notting Hill =

Coordinates: 51.5165°N 0.2029°W

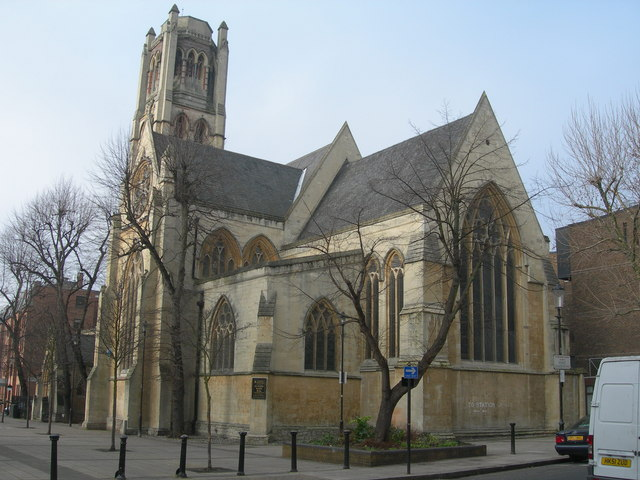
- All Saints Notting Hill
- Location: Talbot Road, Notting Hill
- Country: England
- Denomination: Church of England
- Churchmanship: Anglo-Catholic
- Website: All Saints Notting Hill

History
- Founder: Samuel Walker
- Dedication: All Saints

Architecture
- Heritage designation: Grade II*
- Designated: 29 July 1949
- Architect(s): William White, with Sir George Gilbert Scott
- Style: Gothic Revival
- Years built: 1861

Administration
- Province: Canterbury
- Diocese: London
- Archdeaconry: Kensington
- Deanery: Kensington and Chelsea

Clergy
- Priest: Philip Corbett SSC

All Saints Notting Hill is a Church of England parish church in Talbot Road, Notting Hill, London, that is affiliated to the Anglo-Catholic Forward in Faith movement. The church is built in a Victorian Gothic Revival style with striking polychromatic decoration. For heritage purposes the church is a Grade II* listed building.

== History ==
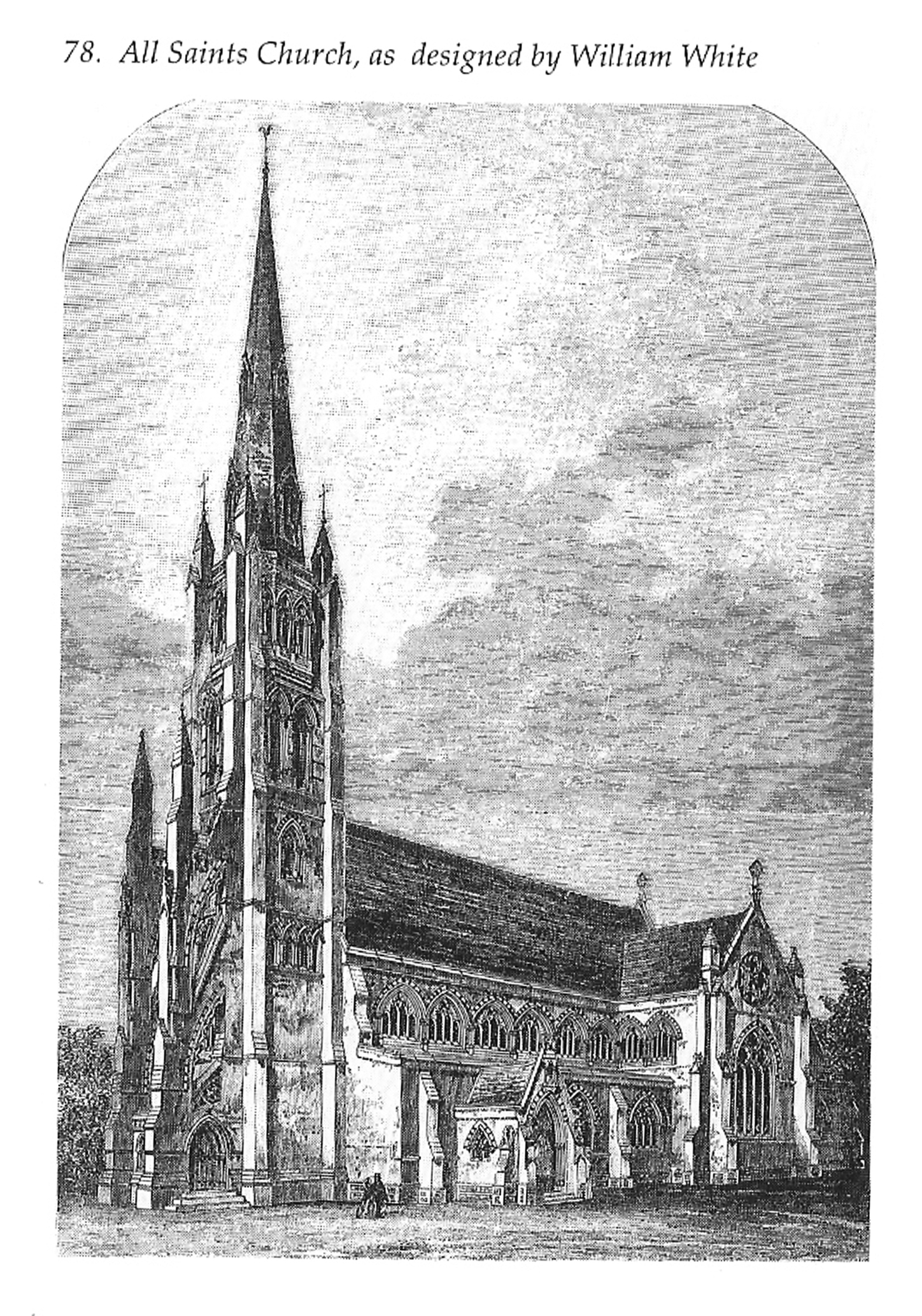
Engraving of William White's design for All Saints, complete with spire

The building of All Saints' Church was begun in 1852 for the Reverend Dr Samuel Walker. Walker was a wealthy property speculator, one of several buying up land in the area that was then to be known as Kensington Park. The church was designed by architect William White, working with Sir George Gilbert Scott, as to be the centrepiece of Walker's local property development, and a church without pew rents. Walker's property speculation in the area was a financial failure and he sold his interests to others speculating on property in the newly emerging area of Kensington Park. As a result, the church-building was left unfinished for a number of years during which time in some quarters it received the epithet "All-Sinners-in-the-Mud".

All Saints was eventually completed in 1861 at a cost of £25,000, without its spire, for the incumbency of Reverend John Light of Trinity College Dublin.

The tower is 100 feet (30 m) high and is said to resemble the Medieval Gothic Belfry of Bruges, Belgium.

All Saints suffered serious bomb damage in The Blitz of World War II, along with neighbouring buildings including Pinehurst Court, at 1–9 Colville Gardens. The first bombs fell on 26 September 1940, and the church was hit again in March and June 1944. The Lady Chapel and the south transept chapel were destroyed. Restoration work was completed in 1951.

On 14 October 1966, Pink Floyd played the first of a number of events known as Notting Hill Fayre at All Saints church hall. The events, staged by the London Free School, were the forerunners of the internationally renowned Notting Hill Carnival. Three years later Hawkwind also played the church hall.

== Clergy ==
From 1931 to 1961 the vicar was the outgoing and gregarious Fr John Twisaday, who established the high church worship tradition at All Saints. From January 2025 Rev. Charles Card-Reynolds will be Vicar.

=== Vicars ===
- 1861–85 John Light
- 1885–96 Robert Trench
- 1896–1907 Philip Herbert Learyk
- 1907–31 Herbert Ridley
- 1932–61 John Herbert Cloete Twisaday
- 1961–66 John Herbert Brewer
- 1966–67 John Henry Dixon
- 1967–74 Peter Clark
- 1976–2018 John Brownsell
- 2019–2024 Philip Corbett
- 2025– Charles Card-Reynolds

== Decoration and fittings ==
The chancel has paintings by Henry Holiday.

== Notable parishioners ==
- Walter Passmore (1867–1946), a singer and actor best known for his comic baritone roles in Gilbert and Sullivan operas with the D'Oyly Carte Opera Company, was a choirboy at All Saints.

== Organs and organists ==
=== Organs ===
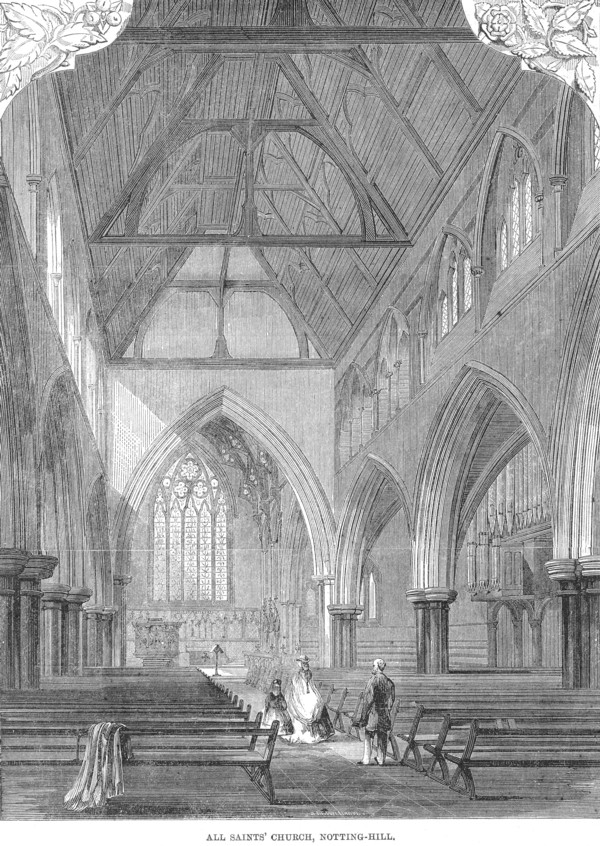
1866: interior looking east with the organ briefly glimpsed in the south aisle

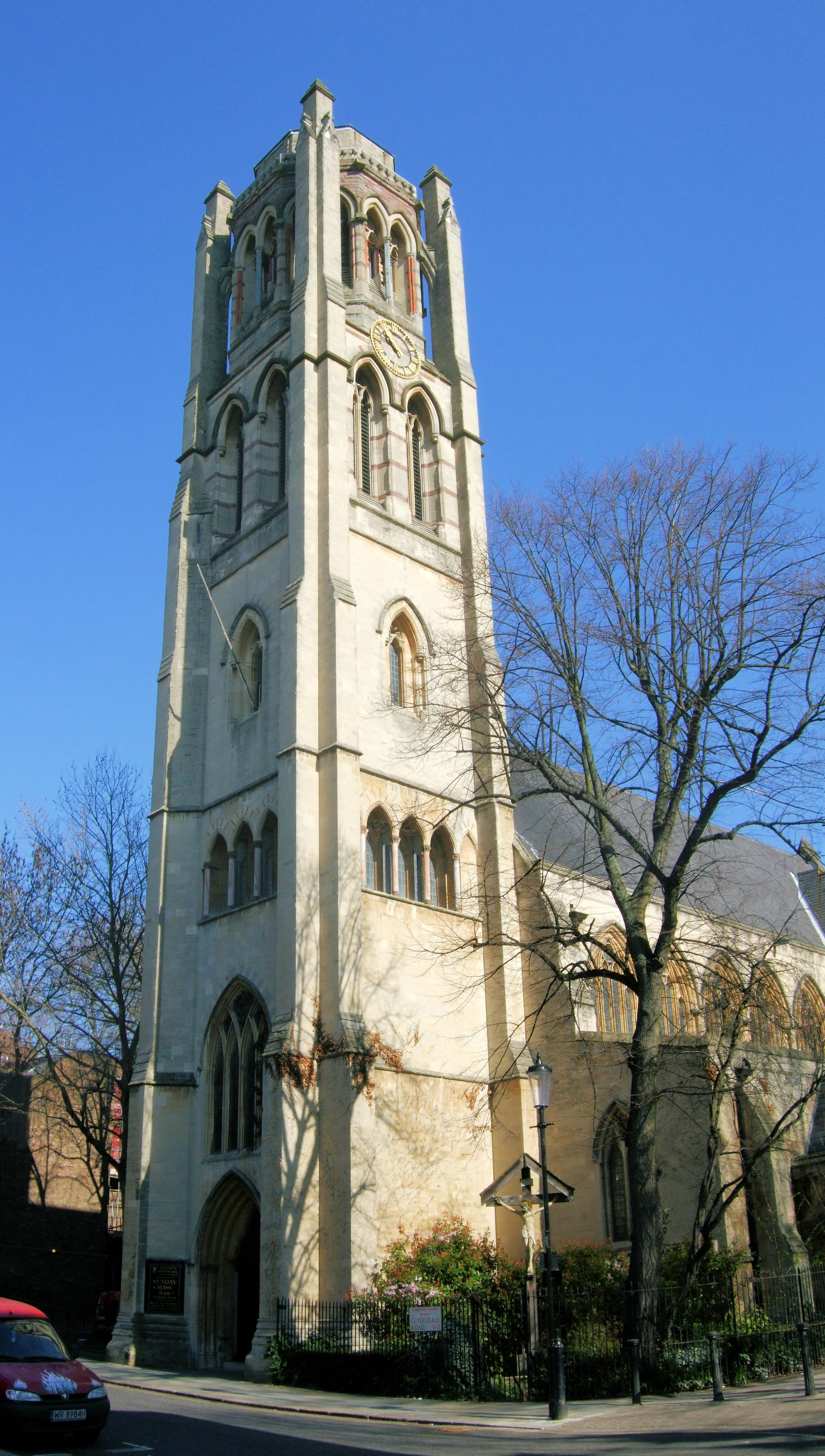
The west tower in 2011

- 1862–63. The church's first organ was built by Gray & Davison having first been displayed at the 1862 International Exhibition. It was located in the south transept of the church. This position led to some criticism:

The north transept of All Saints', Notting Hill, was designed by Mr. White, specially for the reception of the organ, and with this end in view he fenestrated it with a large traceried rose placed high up in the wall [...] the authorities caused the organ to be placed in the south transept, thus completely blocking up a very beautiful four-light window. The effect of the opposite transept, with the blank wall space left perfectly bare, is very unpleasing. [...] The organ in question, by Gray and Davison, occupies an elevated position, and has the somewhat unusual appendage (for a modern instrument) of a choir organ.

- 1902. A new three-manual organ by Norman and Beard was installed, in the north chancel and north transept.
- 1952. The organ was reconstructed by Percy Daniel & Co, Clevedon, with the pipe-work placed inside the tower speaking into the church via an opening onto the west gallery.

=== Organists ===
- (n.d.) Henry John Gauntlett (9 July 1805 Wellington – 21 February 1876 Kensington). Mus.D. (Lambeth, 1843)
- (n.d.) George Benjamin Allen (21 April 1822 London – 30 November 1897 Brisbane) Mus.B. (Oxon, 1852).
- (1873–86) Edward Henry Birch. (12 December 1849 Uxbridge – 9 April 1934 Kensington) Mus.B. (Oxon, 1875).
- (1885/6?-at least 1892) George Ernest Lake (29 May 1854 London – 15 March 1893 London).
- (noted In post in1902 & 1921) Richard William Robertson (c.1880 Kensington – 11 May 1936 St Pancras).
- (1905–) Henry Scott-Baker (1880 London -?) A.R.A.M., L.R.A.M., A.R.C.O.
- (noted In post in 1921) Benham Blaxland (1861 Parramatta – 1926 London).
- (1936–42) Joseph Hurst Bannister (1882 Burton-upon-Trent – 2 August 1942 Lindfield).
- (noted in post in 1957/8) Nicholas Jackson (1934– ), 3rd Bt (1979). LRAM.
- (1975) Organist post advertised jointly with St John's Notting Hill, £200 p.a.
- (noted in post 2005) Andrew Tait GGSMD MA MMus.
- (2021–23) Christopher Myhill (1980– )

==== Assistant organists ====
- 1877–79 Henry William Richards (16 April 1865, Notting Hill) – 4 January 1956. Reading). Mus.D. (Dunelm, 1903), Hon.R.A.M., Hon.R.C.M., F.R.C.O.
- September 1959 Assistant organist post advertised at £40 p.a.
