= Barry Tippett =

Australian rules footballer

Personal information
- Full name: Barry Tippett
- Born: 16 March 1957 (age 69)
- Original team: Shepparton
- Height: 175 cm (5 ft 9 in)
- Weight: 73 kg (161 lb)

Playing career^{1}
Years	Club	Games (Goals)
1976–1978	Melbourne	18 (9)
- ^{1} Playing statistics correct to the end of 1978.

Barry Tippett (born 16 March 1957) is a former Australian rules footballer who played for the Melbourne Football Club in the Victorian Football League (VFL).
