= Kinsley Mountains =

Mountain range in Nevada, United States

- Location within Nevada

Highest point
- Elevation: 2,143 m (7,031 ft)

Geography
- Country: United States
- State: Nevada
- District: Elko County
- Range coordinates: 40°9′54.761″N 114°20′22.056″W
- Topo map: USGS Kinsley Mountains

The Kinsley Mountains are a mountain range in Elko County, Nevada.
