= Currie, Nevada =

Unincorporated community in Nevada, U.S.

- Unincorporated community
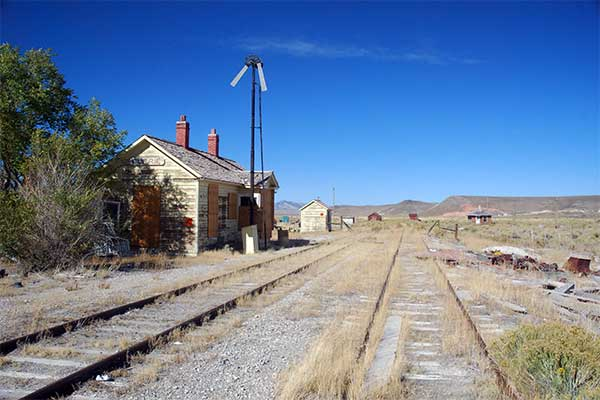
- The Nevada Northern Railway depot in Currie

- Location within the state of Nevada
- Coordinates: 40°16′00″N 114°44′35″W
- Country: United States
- State: Nevada
- County: Elko
- Elevation: 5,804 ft (1,769 m)
- Time zone: UTC-8 (Pacific (PST))
  - Summer (DST): UTC-7 (PDT)
- GNIS feature ID: 856224

Currie is an unincorporated community in Elko County, Nevada, United States. It is often considered a ghost town, and its population is around 20.

The town is named after Joseph Currie, who started a ranch there in 1885. Discovery of copper in the neighboring town of Ely prompted the building of a railroad from Ely to the Southern Pacific main-line, at Cobre, Nevada. Currie is the midpoint between the two towns. On March 22, 1906, the first passenger train from Cobre to Currie was operated. Between 1906 and 1941, approximately 4.6 million passengers passed through Currie on rail.

The Ely copper smelters were closed on June 20, 1983 and the railroad closed one day later.

The major portion of the town, the business district (20 acres) consists of Goshute Mercantile, the bar, adjoining house, cabins, RV park, garage, historic buildings, and corrals. There is also the Nevada Northern Railway, Elko County School District - Currie Elementary school, Lear Ranch and the Nevada Highway Department.
