= Spruce Mountain (Nevada) =

Mountain in the American state of Nevada

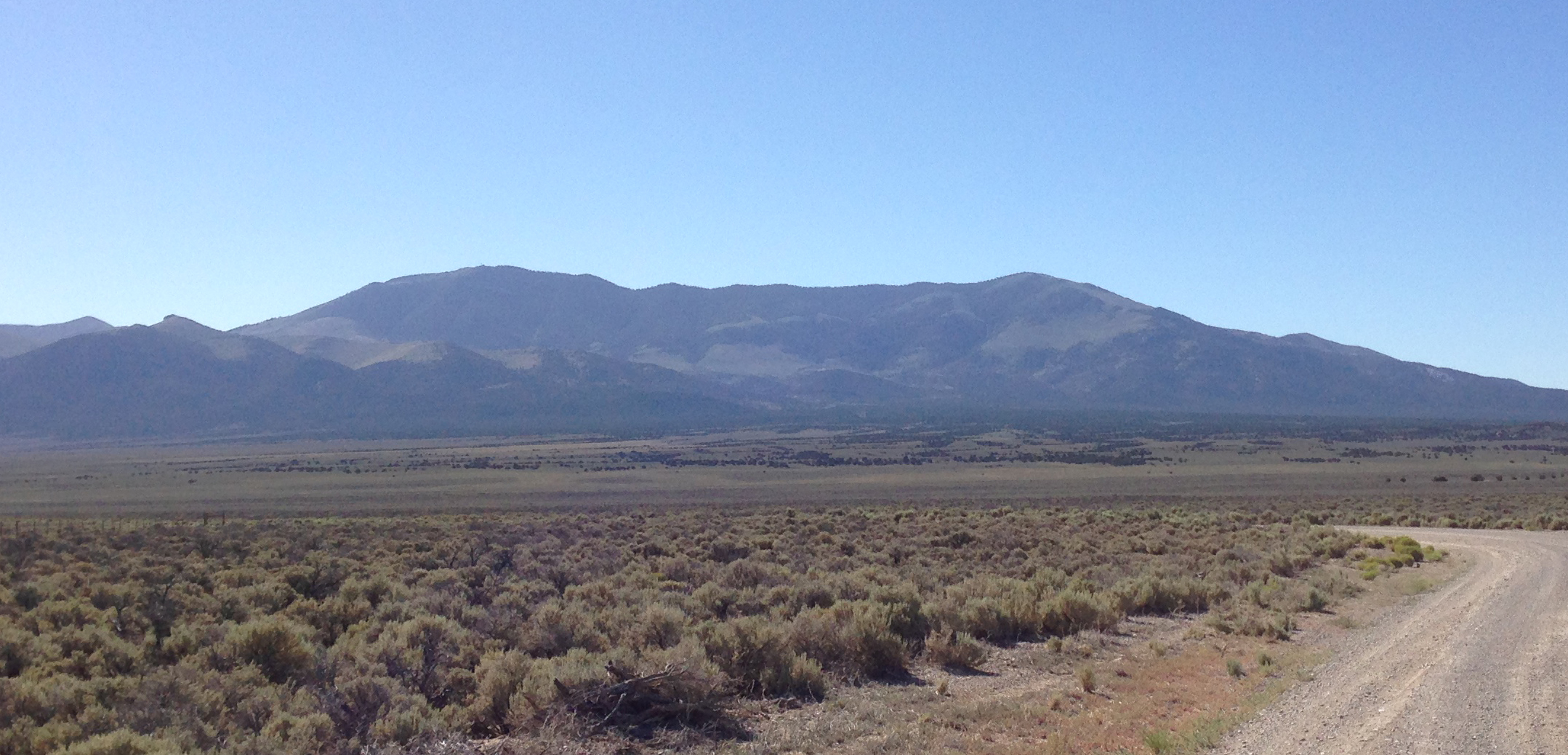

Highest point
- Elevation: 10,267 ft (3,129 m) NAVD 88
- Prominence: 3,930 ft (1,198 m)
- Coordinates: 40°33′08″N 114°49′18″W

Geography
- Location within Nevada
- Location: Elko County, Nevada
- Parent range: Pequop Mountains
- Topo map(s): USGS Spruce Mountain, NV

Climbing
- Easiest route: A four-wheel drive road ascends directly to the summit

Spruce Mountain is a mountain in Elko County, Nevada, United States. It was named from the spruce timber near the summit. Spruce Mountain ranks twenty-fifth among the most topographically prominent peaks in the state. The summit is at 10,267 feet (3,129 m). Spruce Mountain is on a northeast–southwest trending ridge with a parallel Spruce Ridge to the northwest. To the east, a low section of hills connects the mountain to the south end of the Pequop Mountains. US Route 93 passes the southwest end of the mountain. The peak is on public land administered by the Bureau of Land Management and thus has no access restrictions.

The western side of the mountain was the site of copper, silver, and lead mining during the late 19th century. The settlement of Sprucemont on the western slope of the mountain supported the mining activity and existed from 1868 through about 1900 and is now a ghost town. Electronics researcher Ralph Hartley was born at Sprucemont in 1888.

== Summit panorama ==
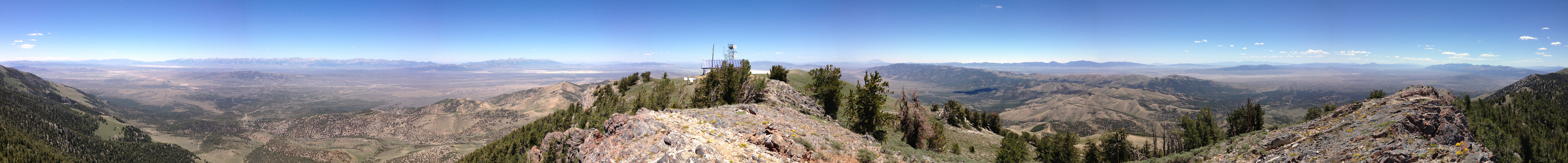
360-degree panorama from the summit of Spruce Mountain
