= Dolly Varden Mountains =

Mountain range in Nevada, United States

- Location within Nevada

Highest point
- Elevation: 2,251 m (7,385 ft)

Geography
- Country: United States
- State: Nevada
- District: Elko County
- Range coordinates: 40°18′59.752″N 114°32′33.087″W
- Topo map: USGS Sharp Peak

The Dolly Varden Mountains are a mountain range in Elko County, Nevada.
