= Pequop Mountains =

Mountain range in Elko County, Nevada, United States

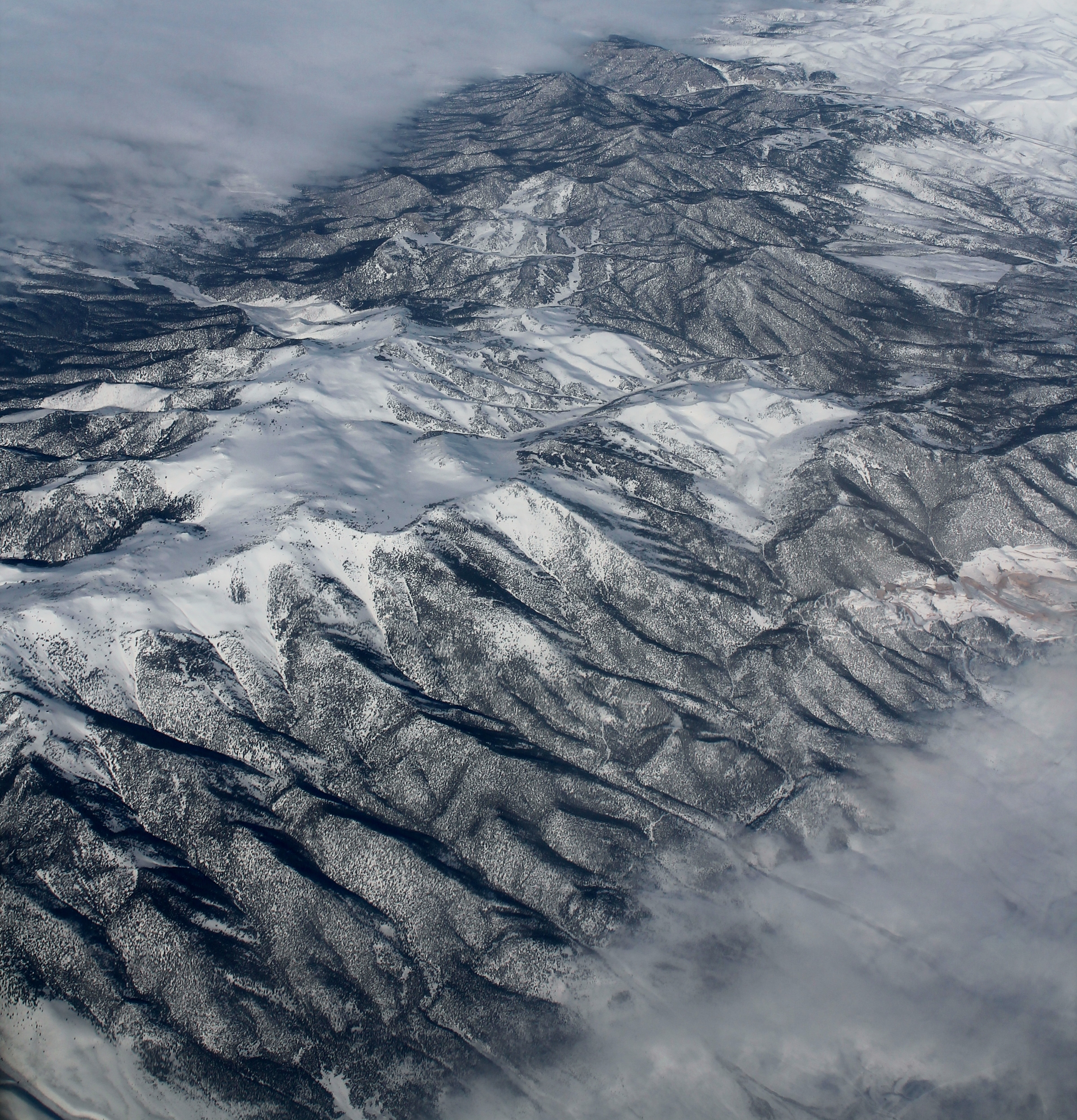
- Aerial view of the Pequop Mountains

Highest point
- Peak: Unnamed point
- Elevation: 9,249 ft (2,819 m)
- Coordinates: 40°43′48″N 114°34′52″W

Geography
- Location within Nevada
- Country: United States
- State: Nevada
- County: Elko

The Pequop Mountains are a mountain range located in eastern Elko County, Nevada, United States. The range runs generally north-south for approximately 51 miles (82 km) The high point of the range is an unnamed peak (at an elevation of 9,249 feet [2,819 m]) located at 40°55.46'N and 114°35.38'W.

== Description ==
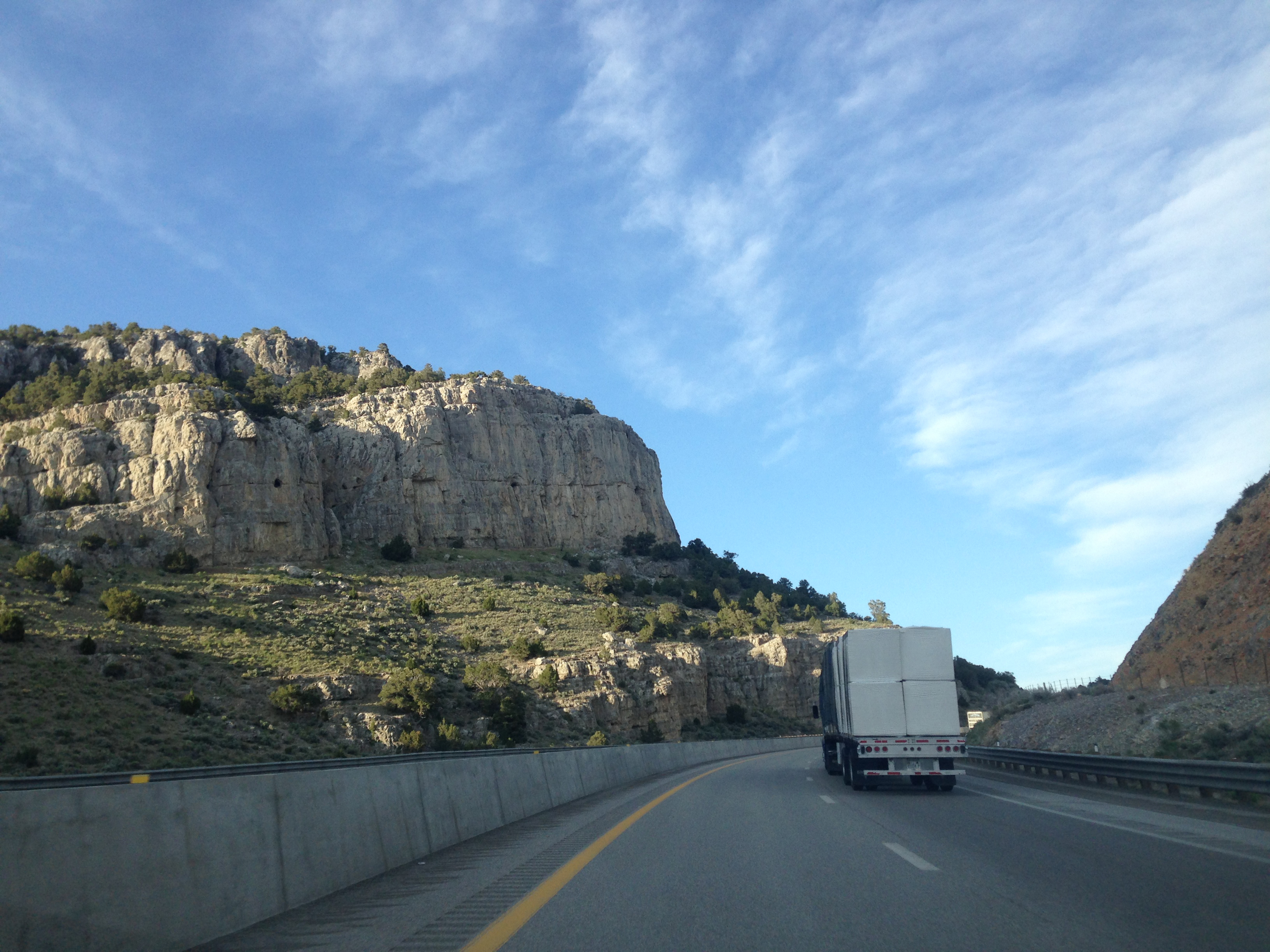
View east along I-80 as it ascends the Pequop Mountains via Maverick Canyon

The range comprises two distinct groups of mountains, separated by a low line of hills at Flower Pass. To the west is Independence Valley and the East Humboldt Range, while to the east is Goshute Valley and the Toano Range. The southern section of the range, bending slightly to the southwest, essentially merges with Spruce Mountain, and is the location of the South Pequop Wilderness Study Area.

These mountains are a serious obstacle to travel between the more level terrain of the Great Salt Lake Desert and the Humboldt River Valley. The First transcontinental railroad was routed around the north end of the range, on its way to Promontory Summit in Utah. The later Western Pacific Railroad line, which crosses the Great Salt Lake Desert, tunneled through the range at Flower Pass (which was itself part of the historic Hastings Cutoff route). Both of these railways now operate under Union Pacific Railroad, the former as part of the Lakeside Subdivision of the Overland Route and the latter as the Shafter Subdivision of the Central Corridor. Interstate 80 crosses the northern section of the range at 6,967 ft (2,124 m) Pequop Summit, its highest point between Parley's Summit in the Wasatch Mountains of Utah and Donner Summit in the Sierra Nevada Range of California.

== See also ==
- List of mountain ranges of Nevada
