= Yellow Bear =

Oglala Lakota leader (c. 1844–1913)

- Mato Gi
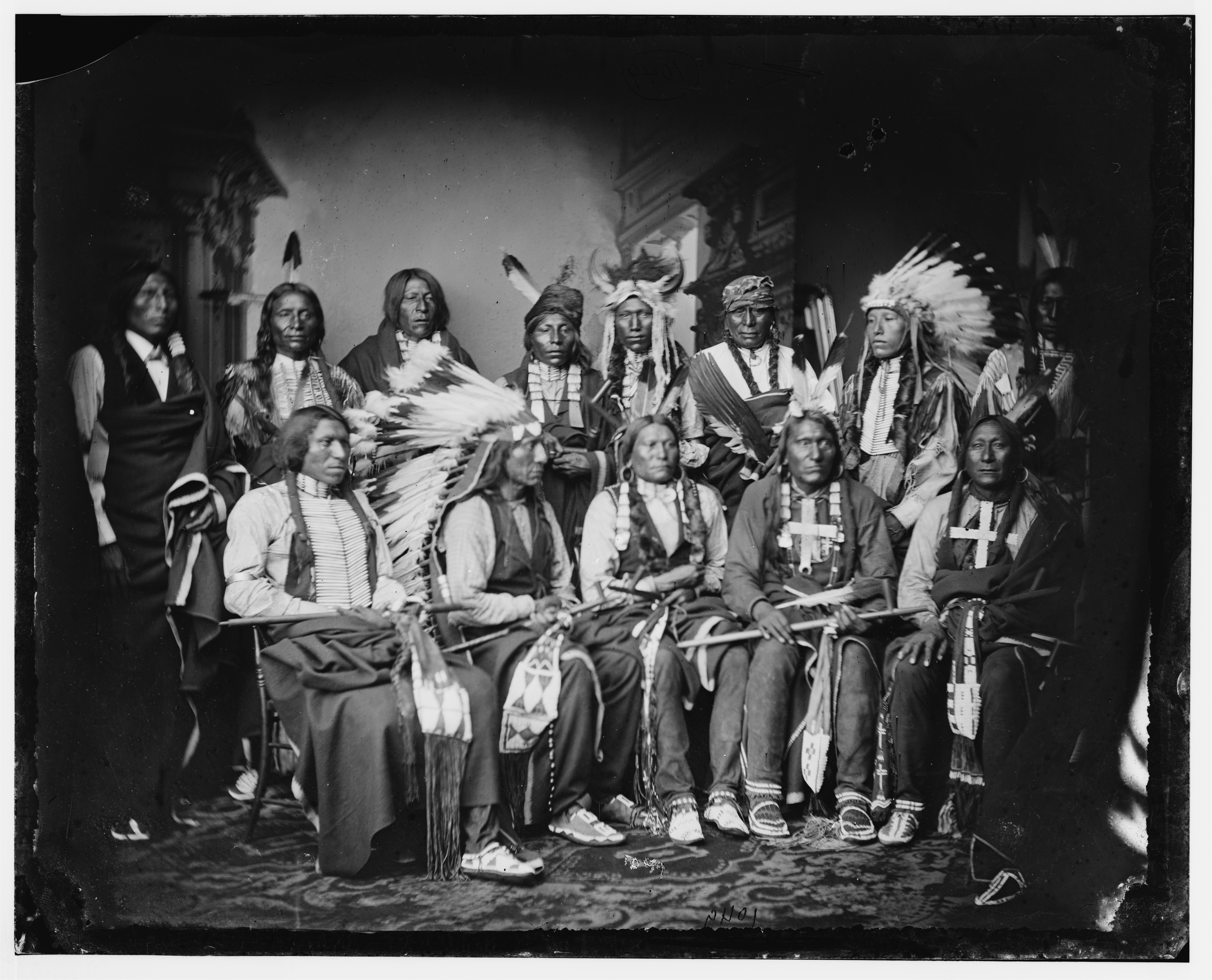
- Yellow Bear (seated, first on left) with group of Sioux

Oglala leader

Personal details
- Born: circa. 1844 South Dakota
- Died: September 1, 1913 Pine Ridge Indian Reservation, South Dakota, United States

Yellow Bear, Mato Ǧí (c. 1844–1913), was an Oglala Lakota leader.

== The first Yellow Bear ==
The first Yellow Bear was a prominent headman among the Tapisleca Tiyóšpaye (translated as the Spleen or Melt Band), one of the major divisions of the southern Oglala Lakota. He accompanied the first Oglala delegation to Washington, D.C., in 1870. By the following year, Colonel John E. Smith rated the size of this leader's village at about 40 lodges, one of the largest family groups within the Tapisleca Band. Yellow Bear was murdered in 1872 near Fort Laramie during a fight with the controversial white trader John Richard Jr.

As the Lakota reservations were being established following the Fort Laramie Treaty of 1868, the majority of the Tapisleca gave up their buffalo hunting way of life and settled at the Red Cloud Agency. By 1874, leadership of Yellow Bear's band appears to have passed to his younger brother, Black Hawk. At about this same time, another Oglala named Yellow Bear began to emerge among the Tapisleca, perhaps another "brother" (in the widest Lakota sense).

== Great Sioux War of 1876-77 ==
Born about 1844 or 1845, Yellow Bear was one of several younger Oglala leaders who came into prominence among the Lakota during the Great Sioux War of 1876-77. With the traditional avenues of a warrior no longer available, he is an example of how a new generation of leaders found success as an intermediary between the U.S. government and the Lakota people. Yellow Bear enlisted as a scout in General George Crook's Indian Scouts in the fall of 1876 and he participated in the Powder River Expedition, fighting alongside the Army against the Northern Cheyenne in the Dull Knife Fight.

By February 1877, Yellow Bear had been promoted to sergeant in Company B, Indian Scouts, and he was recognized as the primary headman or spokesman of the Tapisleca band at the Red Cloud Agency, indications of his growing influence. Photographer D. S. Mitchell included a portrait of Yellow Bear in his series of prominent Oglala portraits taken that summer or fall. During the excitement over Crazy Horse in the fall of 1877, Yellow Bear attended the council with other Oglala headmen. When Indian scouts were used to surround Crazy Horse's village on September 4, Yellow Bear was not present but he sent word that he agreed with the action. In the fall of 1877, he was selected as one of the Oglala delegates together with Red Cloud sent to Washington, D.C., to meet with the president. "I want to know now which is the best way we can live for a long time," he told President Hayes. "I have a band of my own and I have come down to work for them."

== Later life ==
Yellow Bear married his first wife, Wild Horse, about 1870. About four years later, he married his wife's younger sister, Holy Day. Together, the family bore eight children, four of whom grew to adulthood.

As the Oglala settled on the Pine Ridge Agency after 1878, the family bands within the Tapisleca established various communities. Yellow Bear's community, known as the Shkokpaya, settled just northwest of Allen, South Dakota, within what later became known as the Pass Creek District of the reservation. The 1890 Pine Ridge census lists the Shkokpaya with 22 families or 99 people. Among the band members listed was Imitates Dog (Sunka Onca), a brother of Yellow Bear. Other sisters of Yellow Bear's wives married Yellow Hawk and Little Crow, both also members of the Shkokpaya. Another prominent member of the Shkokpaya was Pawnee Killer, though his relationship to Yellow Bear is not known.

Yellow Bear continued to serve as a prominent Oglala leader at Pine Ridge, again traveling to Washington, D.C., in 1888. He died September 1, 1913, near Allen, South Dakota.
