= Fairfield, Utah =

Town in the state of Utah, United States

Fairfield
- Town
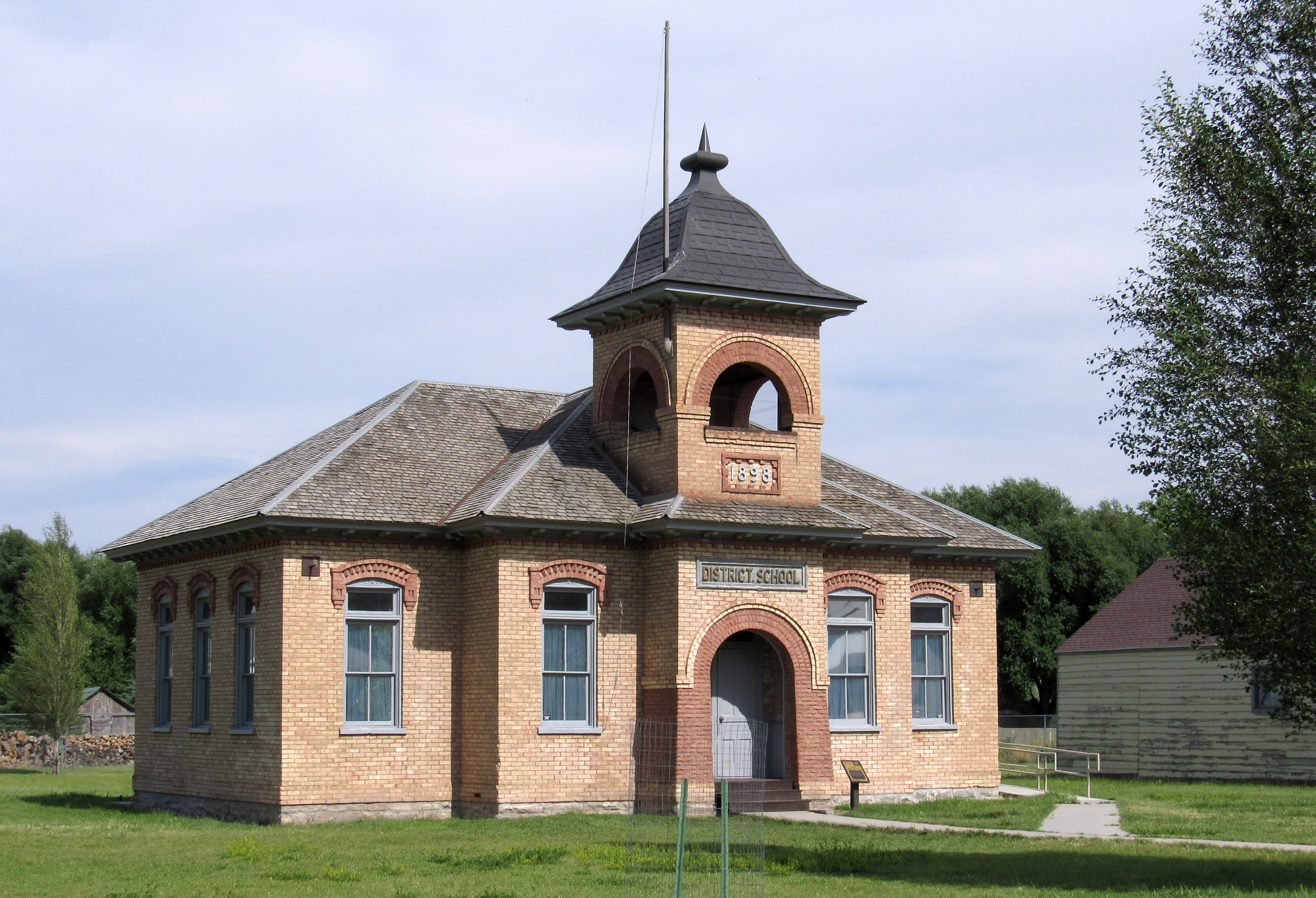
- Old Fairfield Schoolhouse

- Location in Utah County and the state of Utah
- Coordinates: 40°15′44″N 112°05′35″W
- Country: United States
- State: Utah
- County: Utah
- Founded: 1855
- Incorporated: December 20, 2004
- Founder: John Carson
- Named for: Amos Fielding

Area
  - Total: 26.11 sq mi (67.63 km^{2})
  - Land: 26.09 sq mi (67.56 km^{2})
  - Water: 0.027 sq mi (0.07 km^{2})
- Elevation: 4,879 ft (1,487 m)

Population (2020)
  - Total: 160
  - Density: 6.1/sq mi (2.4/km^{2})
- Time zone: UTC-7 (Mountain (MST))
  - Summer (DST): UTC-6 (MDT)
- ZIP code: 84013
- Area codes: 385, 801
- Geographic Names Information System feature ID: 2412611
- Website: fairfieldtown-ut.gov

Fairfield is a town in Utah County, Utah, United States. It is part of the Provo–Orem, Utah Metropolitan Statistical Area. It is located in the southwest corner of Cedar Valley about 50 miles (80 km) southwest of Salt Lake City and 5 miles (8.0 km) south of Cedar Fort on Utah State Route 73, west of Utah Lake. The population was 160 at the 2020 census.

== History ==
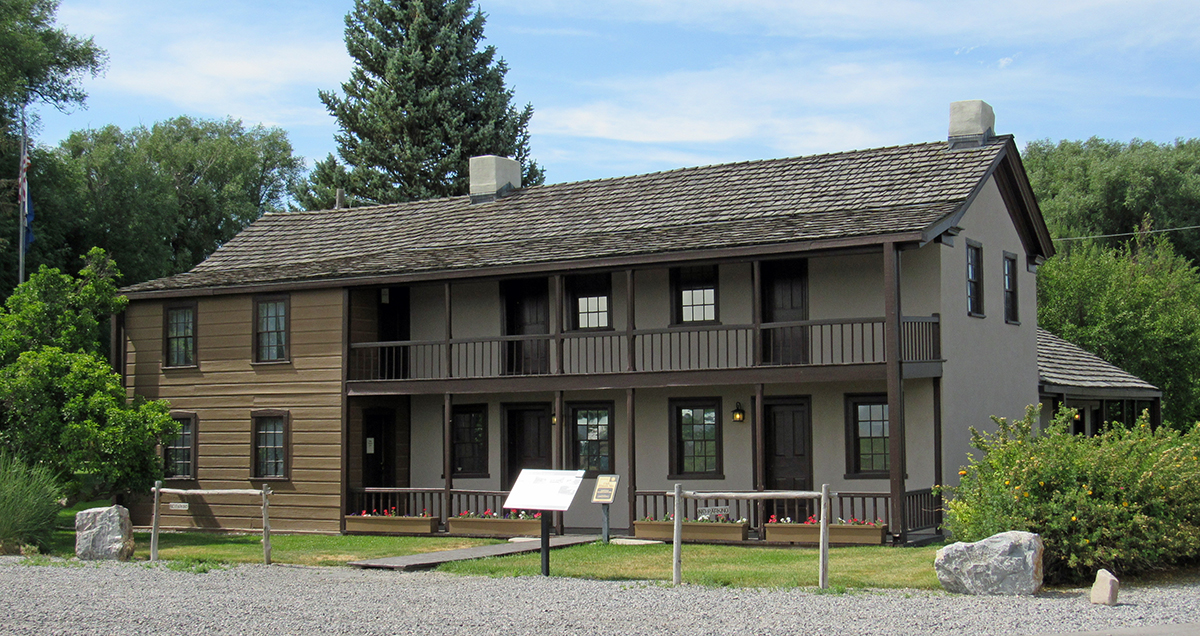
Stagecoach Inn, Camp Floyd State Park in Fairfield

The town was founded in 1855 when John Carson, his four brothers, and others settled in the Cedar Valley. The settlement was soon known as Frogtown. The population ballooned after the arrival of Johnston's Army in 1858-59, sent to Utah to suppress the rumored rebellion there. The army established a nearby camp called Camp Floyd, and the population grew to over 7,000, including 3,500 troops (nearly one-third of the entire U.S. Army at that time), teamsters, gamblers, and camp followers of various persuasions. With no rebellion taking place, the troops were recalled in 1861 and sent east to fight for the Union with the outbreak of the Civil War.

Frogtown became Fairfield in 1861, named after Amos Fielding, who had participated in establishing the community.

The Stagecoach Inn, located in Fairfield and now a museum, was used by travelers passing through via stagecoach, military personnel, and riders on the Pony Express trail.

Fairfield was incorporated in 2004 due to concerns about growth from surrounding communities, and a desire to maintain the community's rural and farming characteristics. Besides agriculture, the town is a destination for Camp Floyd tourists and home to a large construction landfill.

== Demographics ==
Historical population
Census	Pop.	Note	%±
1860	303		—
1870	223		−26.4%
1880	172		−22.9%
1890	273		58.7%
1900	168		−38.5%
1910	279		66.1%
1920	95		−65.9%
1930	129		35.8%
1940	93		−27.9%
1950	99		6.5%
2010	119		—
2020	160		34.5%
Source: U.S. Census Bureau

As of the census of 2010, 119 people lived in the town. There were 41 housing units. The racial makeup was 95.8% White, 1.7% from some other race, and 2.5% from two or more races. Hispanic or Latino of any race were 4.2% of the population.

== Climate ==
Fairfield has a continental climate (Köppen Dfb) bordering a semi-arid climate (BSk).

Climate data for Fairfield, Utah, 1991–2020 normals, extremes 1950–present
Month	Jan	Feb	Mar	Apr	May	Jun	Jul	Aug	Sep	Oct	Nov	Dec	Year
Record high °F (°C)	63 (17)	70 (21)	81 (27)	85 (29)	96 (36)	100 (38)	102 (39)	101 (38)	100 (38)	88 (31)	78 (26)	70 (21)	102 (39)
Mean maximum °F (°C)	51.6 (10.9)	58.0 (14.4)	71.0 (21.7)	78.3 (25.7)	86.7 (30.4)	92.7 (33.7)	98.0 (36.7)	96.0 (35.6)	91.3 (32.9)	81.1 (27.3)	67.9 (19.9)	55.5 (13.1)	98.3 (36.8)
Mean daily maximum °F (°C)	39.3 (4.1)	44.5 (6.9)	56.0 (13.3)	63.0 (17.2)	72.1 (22.3)	82.5 (28.1)	90.2 (32.3)	88.6 (31.4)	80.0 (26.7)	66.6 (19.2)	51.8 (11.0)	40.2 (4.6)	64.6 (18.1)
Daily mean °F (°C)	26.3 (−3.2)	31.1 (−0.5)	40.4 (4.7)	46.3 (7.9)	54.4 (12.4)	63.2 (17.3)	70.6 (21.4)	69.0 (20.6)	60.2 (15.7)	47.6 (8.7)	35.8 (2.1)	26.7 (−2.9)	47.6 (8.7)
Mean daily minimum °F (°C)	13.3 (−10.4)	17.6 (−8.0)	24.8 (−4.0)	29.6 (−1.3)	36.8 (2.7)	43.9 (6.6)	51.0 (10.6)	49.4 (9.7)	40.3 (4.6)	28.5 (−1.9)	19.8 (−6.8)	13.2 (−10.4)	30.7 (−0.7)
Mean minimum °F (°C)	−7.3 (−21.8)	−2.6 (−19.2)	10.6 (−11.9)	16.6 (−8.6)	23.2 (−4.9)	31.7 (−0.2)	41.0 (5.0)	38.7 (3.7)	26.0 (−3.3)	14.8 (−9.6)	3.8 (−15.7)	−6.4 (−21.3)	−12.9 (−24.9)
Record low °F (°C)	−29 (−34)	−36 (−38)	−11 (−24)	7 (−14)	14 (−10)	21 (−6)	31 (−1)	27 (−3)	16 (−9)	2 (−17)	−20 (−29)	−29 (−34)	−36 (−38)
Average precipitation inches (mm)	1.27 (32)	1.33 (34)	1.17 (30)	1.18 (30)	1.37 (35)	0.78 (20)	0.67 (17)	0.66 (17)	0.82 (21)	1.15 (29)	0.79 (20)	1.32 (34)	12.51 (318)
Average snowfall inches (cm)	10.7 (27)	5.9 (15)	3.5 (8.9)	1.4 (3.6)	0.1 (0.25)	0.0 (0.0)	0.0 (0.0)	0.0 (0.0)	0.0 (0.0)	0.7 (1.8)	3.4 (8.6)	7.9 (20)	33.6 (85)
Average precipitation days (≥ 0.01 in)	7.5	7.4	8.0	8.9	7.4	4.4	5.0	6.4	4.9	5.7	6.4	6.7	78.7
Average snowy days (≥ 0.1 in)	4.2	3.5	2.1	1.0	0.2	0.0	0.0	0.0	0.0	0.4	1.6	4.3	17.3
Source: NOAA

== See also ==
- List of cities and towns in Utah
- Utah War
