= David Rodocker =

American photographer

David Rodocker, circa. 1890. From advertisement in old high school yearbook, Winfield, Kansas.

David Rodocker (October 13, 1840 – July 29, 1919) was an American photographer active in Champaign, Illinois in the 1860s, Winfield, Kansas, 1871–1919, and traveling through Black Hills, 1877.

== Early years ==
Born in Ashland County, Ohio, in 1840, David Rodocker opened his first photography studio in Champaign, Illinois. He moved to Winfield, Kansas, in late 1870 where he opened a studio by the following year.

== Black Hills visit ==
In January 1877, Rodocker sold his Winfield studio and took his camera on the road to the Black Hills, spending the summer producing views of the mines and mining towns. He departed the Black Hills in October 1877, apparently heading south and passing through the Red Cloud Agency in northwestern Nebraska where he produced several additional photographs. He arrived about a month after the death of Crazy Horse so he could not have produced a portrait of the famed Oglala Sioux war leader.

== Later years ==
Rodocker traveled to Chicago where he purchased new equipment and made arrangements with publisher L. M. Melander to market and sell his views. Melander produced a series called "Views of the Black Hills Mining Country and in the Sioux Indian Country", a set of 79 stereoviews.

Rodocker returned to Winfield, Kansas, in November 1877 and reopened his studio. "He brings with him many beautiful stereoscopic views of the mountains, peaks, hills, gulches, claims, camps, and towns in the gold region," the local newspaper reported. "He says he will return to the Hills about next Centennial."

Rodocker did return to the Black Hills briefly in 1880, but continued to operate his Winfield studio. He later worked for the government as a photographer, returning to Winfield in 1894. Rodocker died in 1919 but his wife and daughter continued to operate the studio until 1925.

== Noted works ==
- Cabinet Card of Chief White Shield and Family, Southern Cheyenne
- Indian Village near the Red Cloud Agency
- Red Cloud Agency
- Studio portrait of Geronimo (Goyathlay, ca. 1825-1909)

== Bibliography ==
- Ephriam D. Dickson III, "Capturing the Lakota Spirit: Photographers at the Red Cloud and Spotted Tail Agencies," Nebraska History, vol. 88 no. 1 & 2 (Spring-Summer 2007) pp. 2–25
