= Fairfield District School =

- U.S. National Register of Historic Places
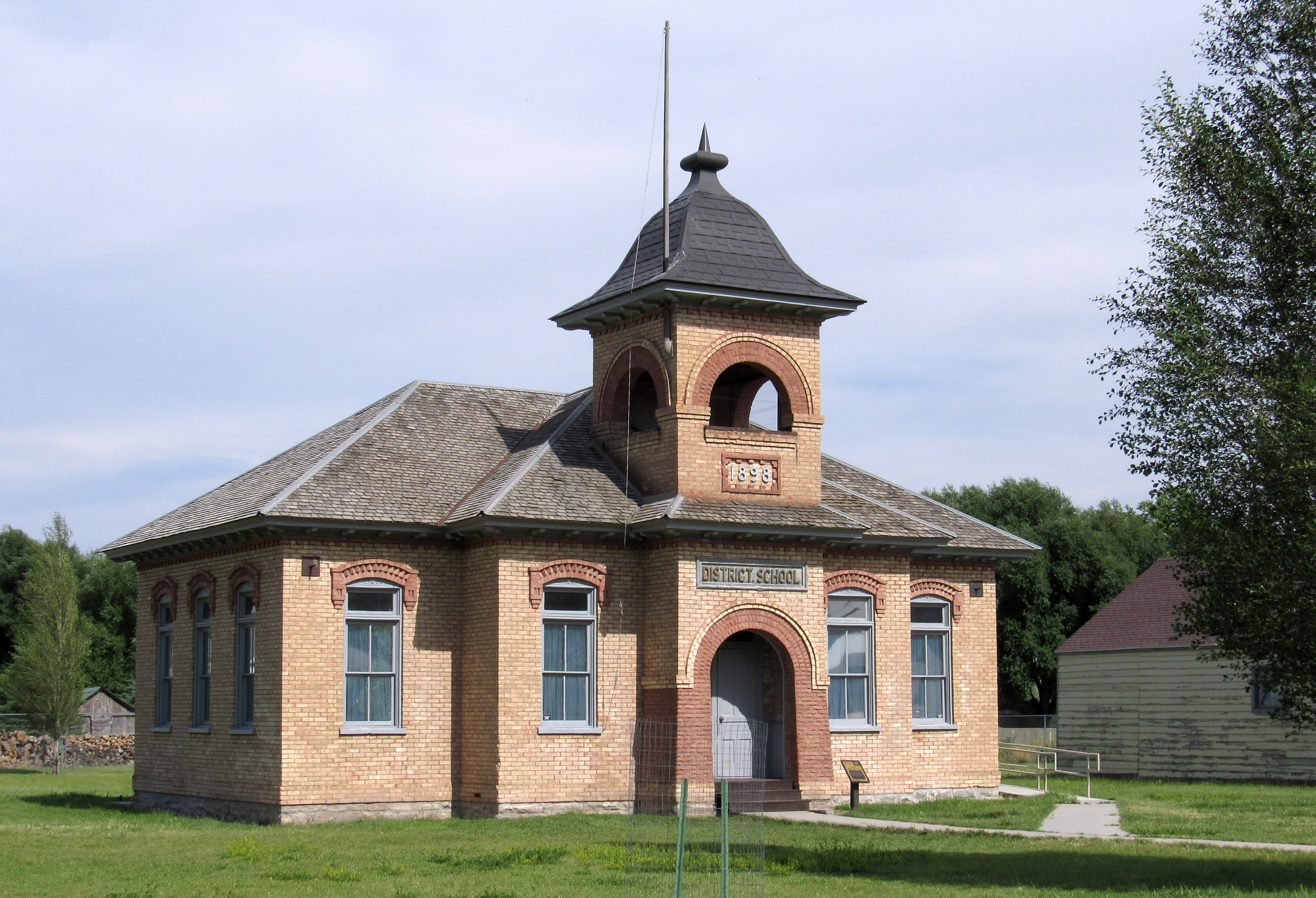
- Fairfield District School, 2015

- Location within Utah Location within the United States
- Location: 59 North Church Street; Fairfield, Utah; United States
- Coordinates: 40°15′41″N 112°05′26″W
- Area: less than one acre
- Built: 1898
- Built by: Andrew Fjeld
- Architect: Richard C. Watkins
- Architectural style: Late Victorian, Eclectic, Other
- NRHP reference No.: 87000992
- Added to NRHP: August 6, 1987

The Fairfield District School is a historic schoolhouse in Fairfield, Utah, United States, that is listed on the National Register of Historic Places (NRHP) and is part of the Camp Floyd State Park Museum (a Utah State Park).

== Description ==
The school is located at 59 North Church Street and was built in 1898 by Andrew Fjeld, a local builder. It includes Late Victorian, Eclectic, other architectural styles.

In 1939, the school was closed and elementary-age children living in Fairfield began to be bused to nearby Cedar Fort for classes. The school building was turned over to the Church of Jesus Christ of Latter-day Saints (LDS Church) in the 1950s. By the mid-1970s, the LDS Church planned to demolish the building. To preserve the structure, Walter Kershaw (who had formerly attended school there) purchased it and donated it to the Utah State Division of Parks and Recreation in 1977.

It was listed on the NRHP on August 6, 1987.

After nearly a decade of work, the restored building was opened to the public in April 2005 and is used as educational space by the state park.

== See also ==
- National Register of Historic Places listings in Utah County, Utah
