= Fort Bridger =

- U.S. National Register of Historic Places
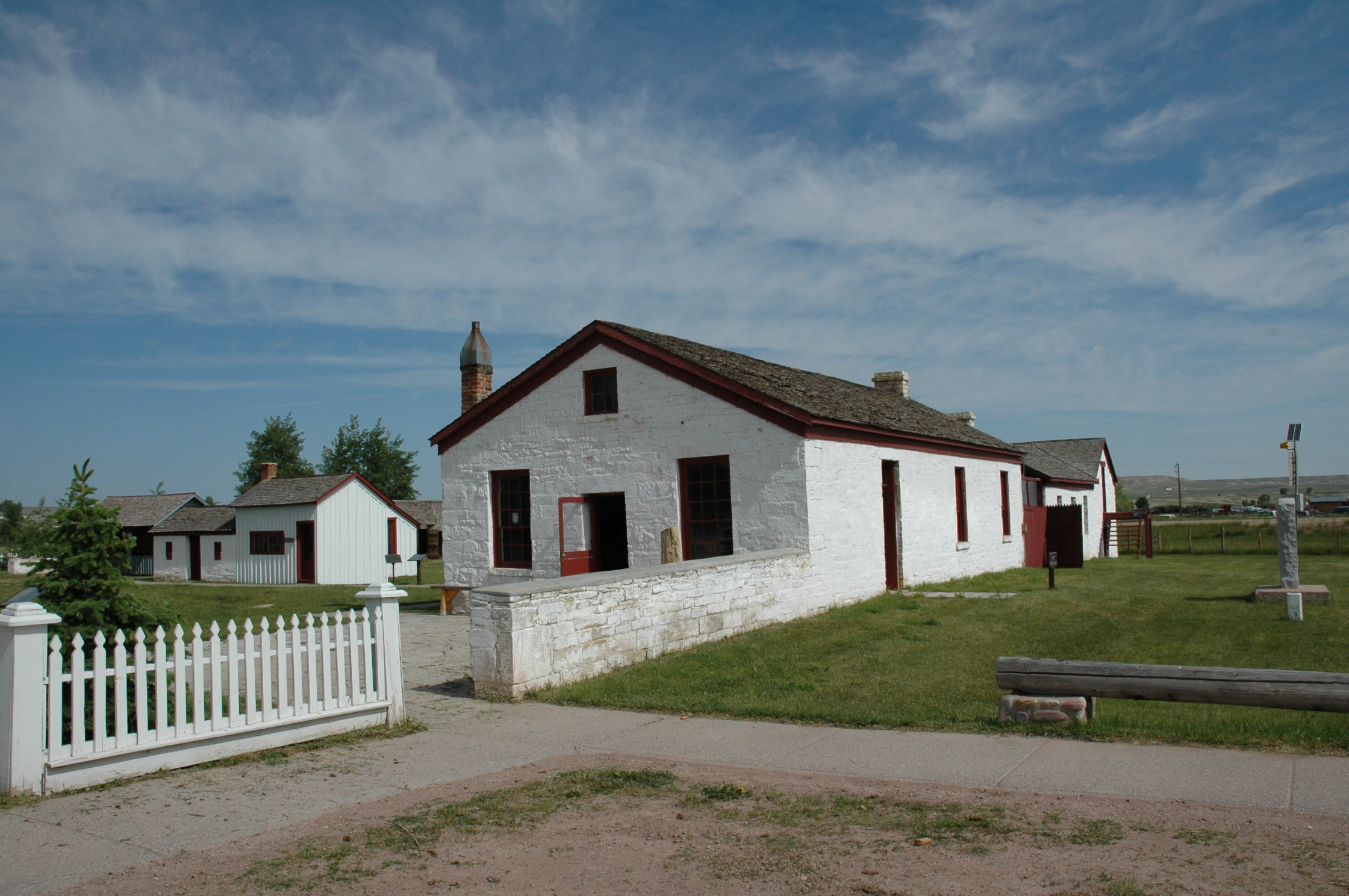
- Fort Bridger

- Location within Wyoming Location within the United States
- Location: Uinta County, Wyoming
- Nearest city: Fort Bridger, Wyoming
- Coordinates: 41°19′4″N 110°23′31″W
- NRHP reference No.: 69000197
- Added to NRHP: 1969-04-16

Fort Bridger was originally a 19th-century fur trading outpost established in 1842, on Blacks Fork of the Green River, in what is now Uinta County, Wyoming, United States and was then part of Mexico. It became a vital resupply point for wagon trains on the Oregon, California, and Mormon Trails. The US Army established a military post here in 1858 during the Utah War, until it was finally closed in 1890. A small town, Fort Bridger, Wyoming, remains near the fort and takes its name from it.

== Bridger's trading post ==
The post was established by the mountain man Jim Bridger, after whom it is named, and Louis Vasquez. In December 1843, Bridger wrote to Pierre Chouteau Jr., "I have established a small fort, with a blacksmith shop and a supply of iron in the road of emigrants on Black Fork of Green River, which promises fairly." According to Stanley Vestal, "His fort consisted simply of an eight-foot stockade, with a corral adjoining on the north. Within that stockade stood four log cabins with flat dirt roofs. One of these housed Bridger's forge and carpenter's bench, another his store, the third his family and possibles, while the fourth was the home of his partner." On October 19, 1852, Mrs. Benjamin G. Ferris visited with her husband, and described the fort as "- a long, low, strongly-constructed log building, surrounded by a high wall of logs, stuck endwise in the ground." On March 9, 1854, Bridger filed a claim with the United States General Land Office, for the 3,800 acres (1,500 hectares) around the fort.

Richard Francis Burton visited the fort in August 1860, and later wrote, "Colonel Bridger, when an Indian trader, placed this post upon a kind of neutral ground between the Snakes and the Crows (Hapsaroke) on the north, the Oglalas and other Sioux to the east, the Arapahoes and Cheyennes on the south, and various tribes of Yutas (Utahs) on the southwest." Bridger, perhaps the most picturesque figure in early Wyoming, was often called the "Daniel Boone" of the Rockies. Bridger Pass was also named for him.

In 1845, Lansford Hastings published a guide entitled The Emigrant's Guide to Oregon and California, which advised California emigrants to leave the Oregon Trail at Fort Bridger, pass through the Wasatch Range across the Great Salt Lake Desert (an 80-mile waterless drive), loop around the Ruby Mountains, and rejoin the California Trail about seven miles west of modern Elko, Nevada (now Emigrant Pass). The ill-fated Donner-Reed Party followed that route, along which they were met by a rider sent by Hastings to deliver letters to traveling emigrants. On July 12, the Donners and Reeds were given one of these letters, in which among other messages, Hastings claimed to have "worked out a new and better road to California", and said he would be waiting at Fort Bridger to guide the emigrants along the new cutoff.

== Mormons and Fort Supply ==
On July 7, 1847, Orson Pratt was amongst the first party of Mormons to arrive at the fort. He described the fort as, "Bridger's post consists of two adjoining log houses, dirt roofs, and a small picket yard of logs set in the ground, and about eight feet high." Nine native lodges were located nearby.

With the arrival of the Mormon pioneers in 1847, disputes arose between Bridger and the new settlers. By 1853, a militia of Mormons was sent to arrest him for selling alcohol and firearms to the Native Americans, a violation of Federal Law. He escaped capture and temporarily returned to the East. Near the existing fort, the Mormons established their own Fort Supply the same year. In 1855, Mormons took over Fort Bridger, reportedly having bought it for $8,000 in gold coins. The Mormons claimed, over Bridger's denials, they had purchased the fort from Vasquez. There was a deed dated August 3, 1855, recorded October 21, 1858, in Salt Lake City in Records Book B. p. 128, that ostensibly sold Fort Bridger to the LDS Church. Bridger and Vasquez's names were signed by H. F. Morrell in the presence of Alinerin Grow and William Adams "Wild Bill" Hickman, purportedly pursuant to a power of attorney. Bridger was absent from the area in 1855, acting as guide for Sir St George Gore.

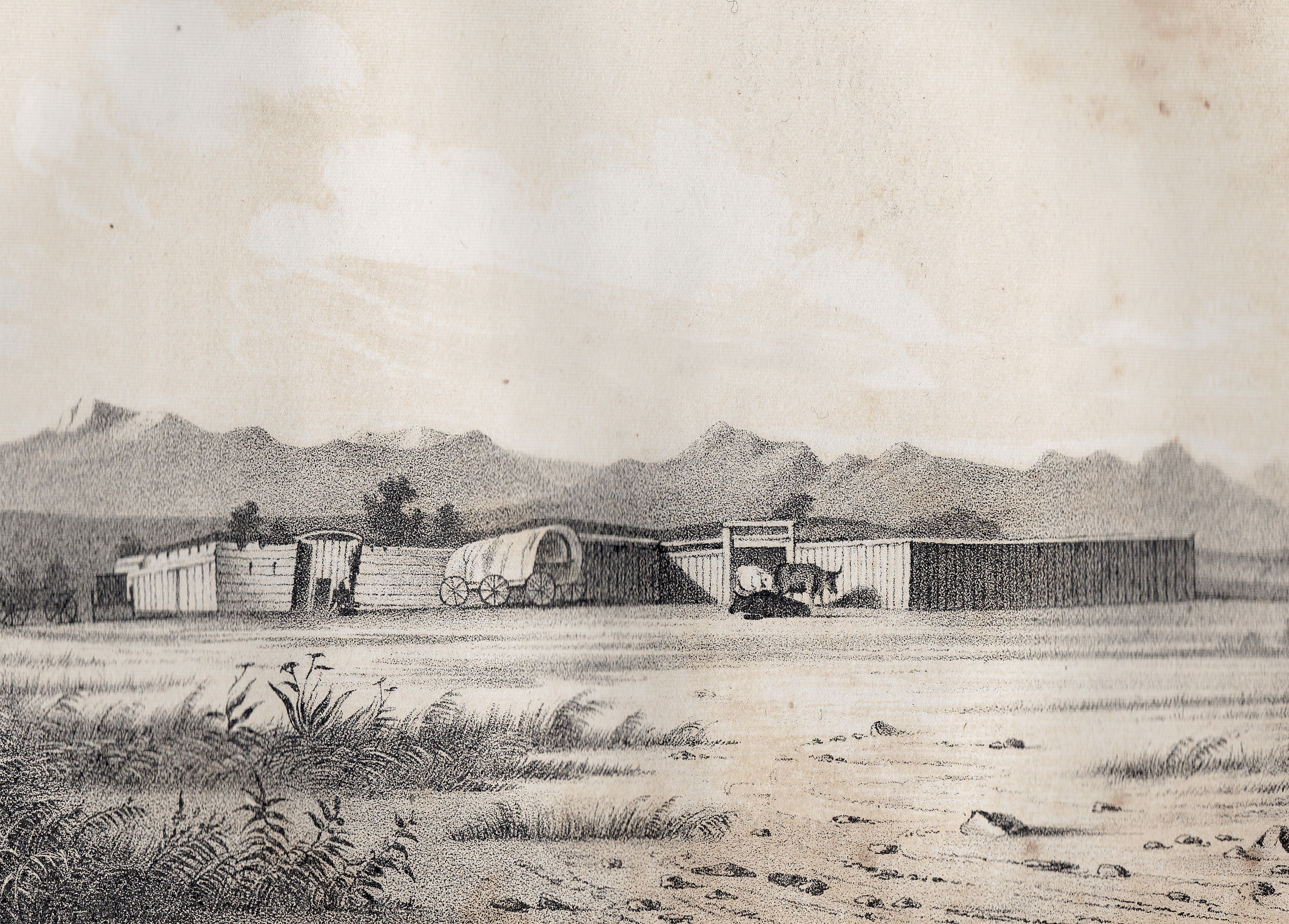
Fort Bridger, 1850.

Andrew Jenson noted, "From 1853 to 1857, Fort Bridger was quite an important 'Mormon' outpost." Orson Hyde arrived at the fort on November 13, 1853, with 39 Mormon settlers. They established Fort Supply on Willow Creek, about 12 miles (19 km) southwest of Fort Bridger. Jenson goes on to state, "Fort Bridger and Fort Supply were deserted by the 'Mormons' in September, 1857, on the approach of Col. Johnston's army."

== Military post ==
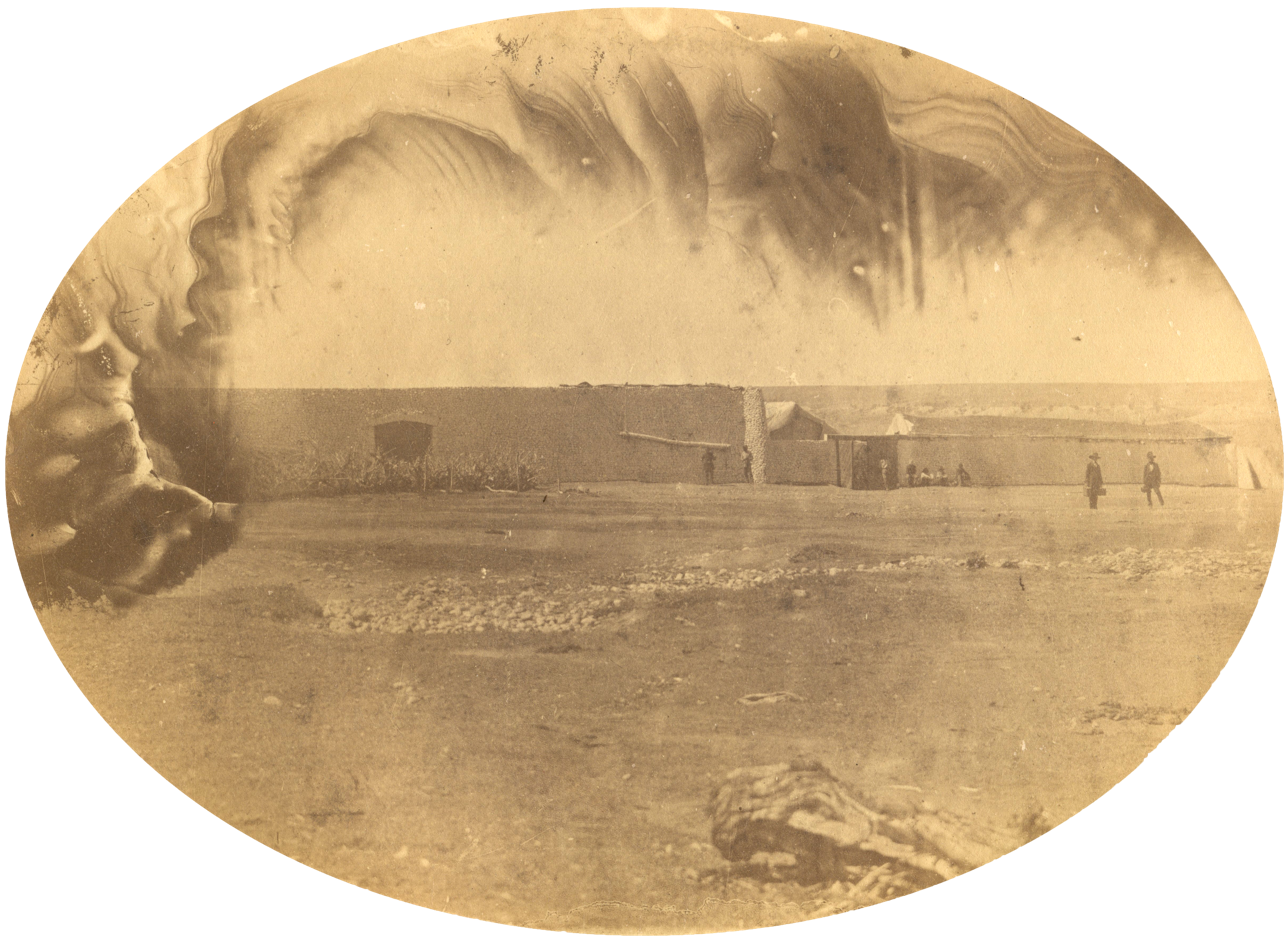
Fort Bridger, 1858. By Samuel C. Mills, photographer with the Simpson expedition.

On November 18, 1857, Bridger leased his surveyed land to the United States, though payment was withheld until Bridger could establish title. Colonel Albert Sidney Johnston was to use the land for his army during the Utah War. Relations had deteriorated between Mormon leaders in Utah Territory and federal authorities in Washington, D.C. President James Buchanan ordered the United States Army to install a new governor, Alfred Cumming to replace Brigham Young. As the army of 2,500 advanced in November 1857, the Mormons set fire to the Fort Bridger buildings. Johnston kept his supplies, with a garrison, within the stone walls which remained, while the army wintered at Camp Scott nearby. In June 1858, as the majority of Johnston's Army set off for Salt Lake City, two companies of troops remained behind. The other troops continued on and eventually established Camp Floyd south of Salt Lake City.

Major William Hoffman commanded the army depot of Fort Bridger from 7 June 1858, until 17 August, when he was relieved by Brevet Lieutenant Colonel Edward Canby. Elements of the Sixth and Tenth Infantry, and First Cavalry, erected storehouses and troop quarters. On July 14, 1859, orders established a military reservation at Fort Bridger amounting to 500 square miles (1,300 km^{2}). Major Richard C. Gatlin took over command on 7 March 1860. Captain Alfred Cumming took command on 4 June 1860, followed by Captain Franklin Gardner on 7 August 1860. Captain Jesse Gove commanded from 29 May 1861 until 9 August, when the number of troops was reduced due to demands of the American Civil War. Captain M. G. Lewis took over command in December 1862, followed by Major Noyes Baldwin in 1865. Captain Anson Mills assumed command from November 1866 until August 1867.

In 1858, William A. Carter was appointed as post sutler at Fort Bridger. Perhaps more than any other individual, the history of the post revolves around this civilian merchant who remained at the center of the post's activities for his lifetime. When William A. Carter died in November 1881, his wife, Mary Elizabeth Hamilton Carter, became sutler, then renamed as the post trader until 1890. Judge Carter was a probate judge who had served in the army during the Seminole Wars. He managed both his sutler's store, and the post office, under one roof.

Chief Washakie signed the Fort Bridger Treaty of 1868 at the fort on 3 July, which ceded the Shoshone and Bannock lands in southwestern Wyoming, and created the Wind River Indian Reservation.

Lieutenant Colonel Henry Morrow was in command from 9 November 1867 until 17 April 1869. During this time, Fort Bridger troops helped guard construction of the Overland Route (Union Pacific Railroad) and the Overland Stage and Mail route. In the summer of 1870, Yale College Professor Othniel Charles Marsh used the fort as a base camp during a geological expedition. The fort was also host to the geological survey conducted by Ferdinand Vandeveer Hayden from 12 September to 1 October 1870. Ultimately, the expansion of the railroads in the west made this and other forts obsolete. Fort Bridger was first abandoned in 1878 but then was re-established two years later. The Army closed the post in 1890 when Wyoming became a state.

== Preservation ==
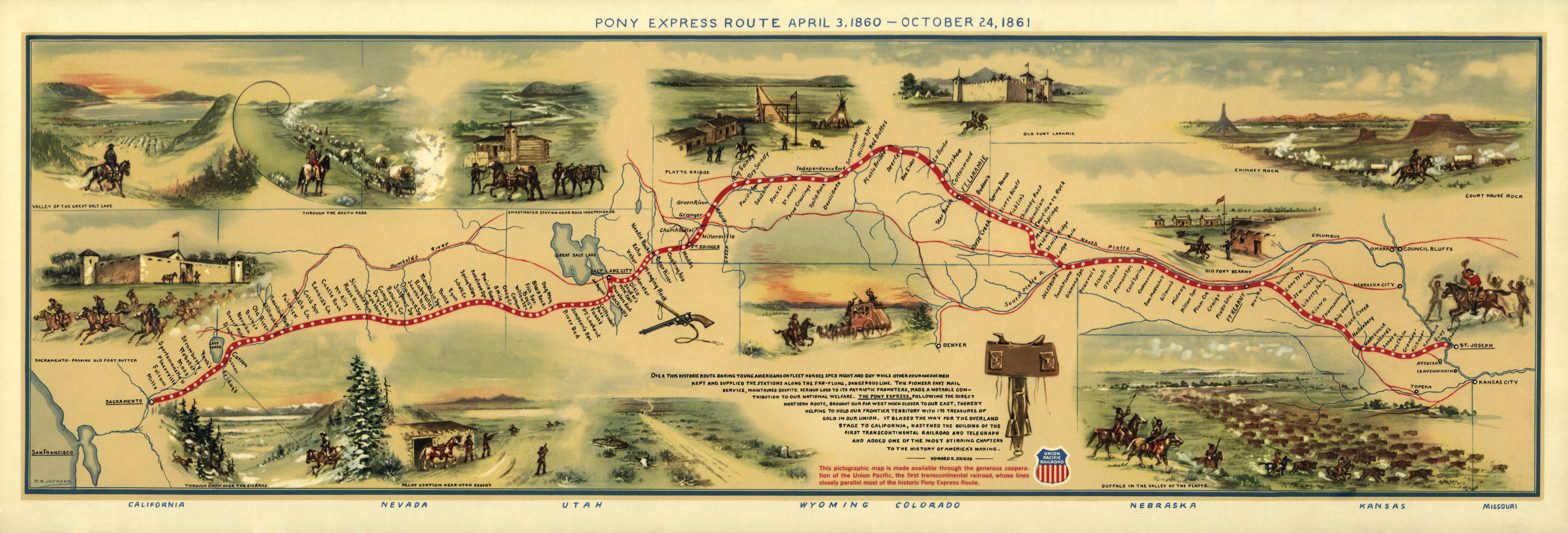
Map of the Pony Express Route in 1860 by William Henry Jackson ~ courtesy the Library of Congress

The historical Fort Bridger has several interesting old buildings still standing: the old Pony Express barn and the Mormon protective wall.

On June 27, 1928, the site of the fort, and remaining buildings, were sold to the Historical Landmark Commission of Wyoming. Dedication ceremonies were held on June 25, 1933 establishing Fort Bridger as a Wyoming Historical Landmark and Museum. The Annual Fort Bridger Muzzle Loading Rendezvous is held every Labor Day weekend.

== See also ==
- Charles Howard
- List of the oldest buildings in Wyoming
- Wyoming Historical Landmarks
