= Daniel S. Mitchell =

Daniel Sedgley Mitchell (1838-1929) was an American photographer best known for his series of stereoscopic views of the Black Hills in 1876, his Native American portraits from the Red Cloud Agency in 1877, and his photographs of the Oklahoma Land Rush in 1889.

== Early life ==
Born in 1838 in York County, Maine, Mitchell began his photographic career as an errand boy in a daguerreotype gallery in Maine at the age of nine. During his early years he worked in a number of photographic galleries, ranging from New York City to Boston to Canada.

== In the West ==
About 1874, Mitchell departed Boston, leaving behind his wife and children. He apparently first stopped briefly in Kansas. In late 1875, he had opened a studio on Eddy Street in Cheyenne, Wyoming Territory. In the spring of 1876, he headed north to the Black Hills with his camera, spending the summer making images among the mines. After returning to Cheyenne, he sold his Black Hills stereoviews and continued to produce portraits for the public. In January 1877, he produced portraits of Brigadier General George Crook and of the court-martial board for Colonel Joseph J. Reynolds. In the spring of 1877, he joined partnership with Joseph H. McGowan and traveled along the Union Pacific Railroad, taking portraits and selling his Black Hills views. In the fall of 1877, he apparently visited the Red Cloud Agency where he took portraits of a majority of the Oglala and Arapaho headmen.

In the spring of 1878, Mitchell and McGowan settled in Omaha where they established the Great Western Photographic Company. Their focus was to mass-produce and market Mitchell's two series of photographs as well as a third series, taken by Charles Howard. The partnership dissolved in the fall of 1878. Mitchell then opened a portrait studio in Omaha, in partnership with May J. Cannell, whom he later married.

== Final years ==
Mitchell next moved to Norfolk, Nebraska; then to Galesburg, Illinois, and finally, in 1889, moved to Guthrie, Oklahoma Territory, where he produced an important photographic series of the land rush. Mitchell died in Guthrie in 1929.

== Examples of photographs ==
=== Indian portraits ===
The largest surviving collection of Mitchell's Indian portraits from the Red Cloud Agency were preserved by Captain John G. Bourke, former aide-de-camp to Brigadier General George Crook. Some of the images are pasted within his diaries, preserved at the U.S. Military Academy at West Point. Another large number of images were donated to the National Anthropological Archives at the Smithsonian Institution. The Nebraska State Historical Society also preserves a number from Bourke's collection.

== Bibliography ==
- Ephriam D. Dickson III, "Capturing the Lakota Spirit, Photographers at the Red Cloud & Spotted Tail Agencies," Nebraska History, Spring/Summer 2007.
