= Camp Floyd State Park Museum =

State park in Fairfield, Utah, United States

- Camp Floyd / Stagecoach Inn State Park and Museum
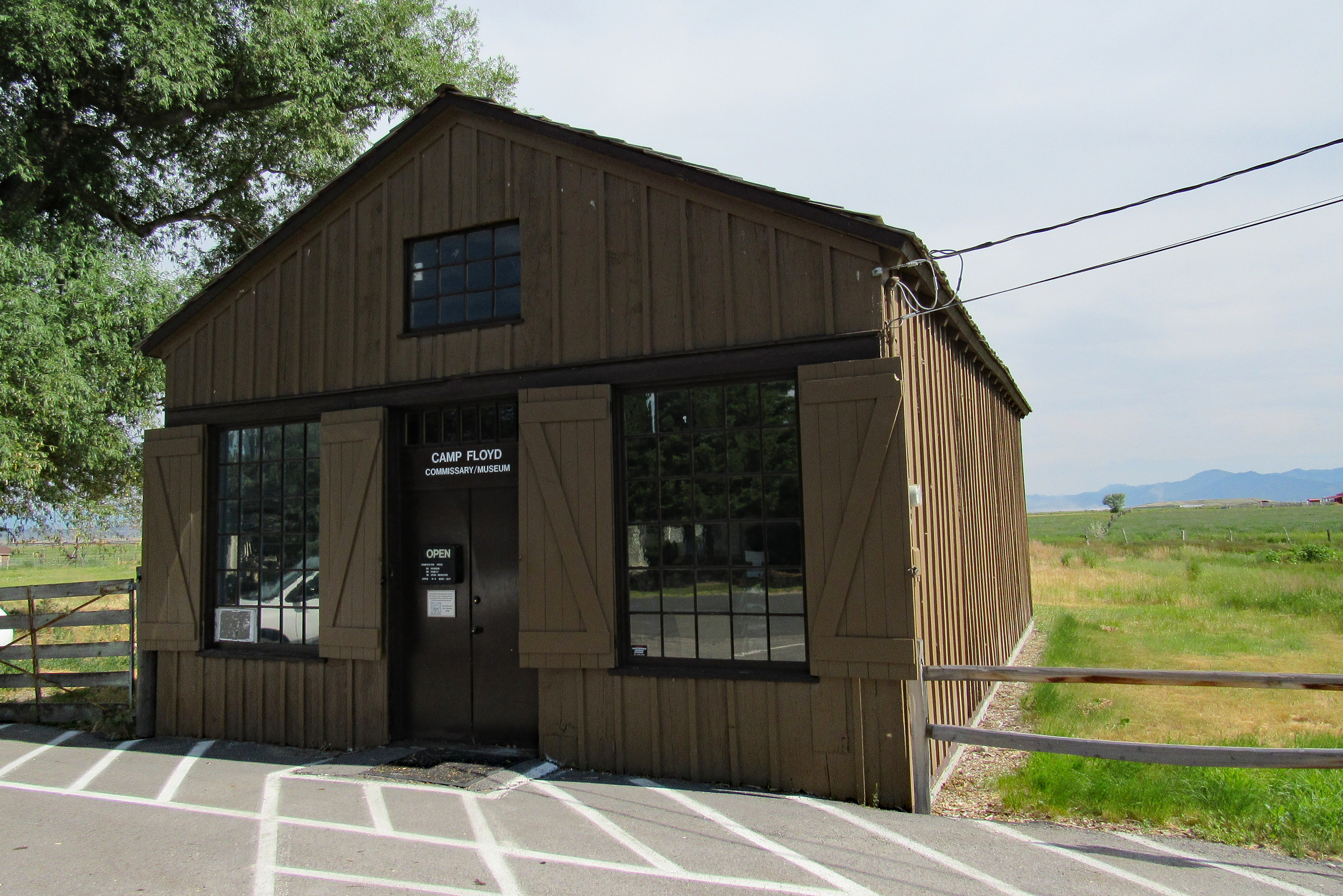
- Camp Floyd's 1858 commissary

- Location within Utah Location within the United States
- Interactive map of Camp Floyd State Park Museum
- Location: Fairfield, Utah, United States
- Coordinates: 40°15′26″N 112°6′14″W
- Area: 40 acres (16 ha)
- Elevation: 4,877 feet (1,487 m)
- Established: 1964
- Visitors: 12,639 (in 2025)
- Operator: Utah State Parks
- Owner: State of Utah
- Website: Official website
- Utah State Parks
- Camp Floyd Site
- U.S. National Register of Historic Places
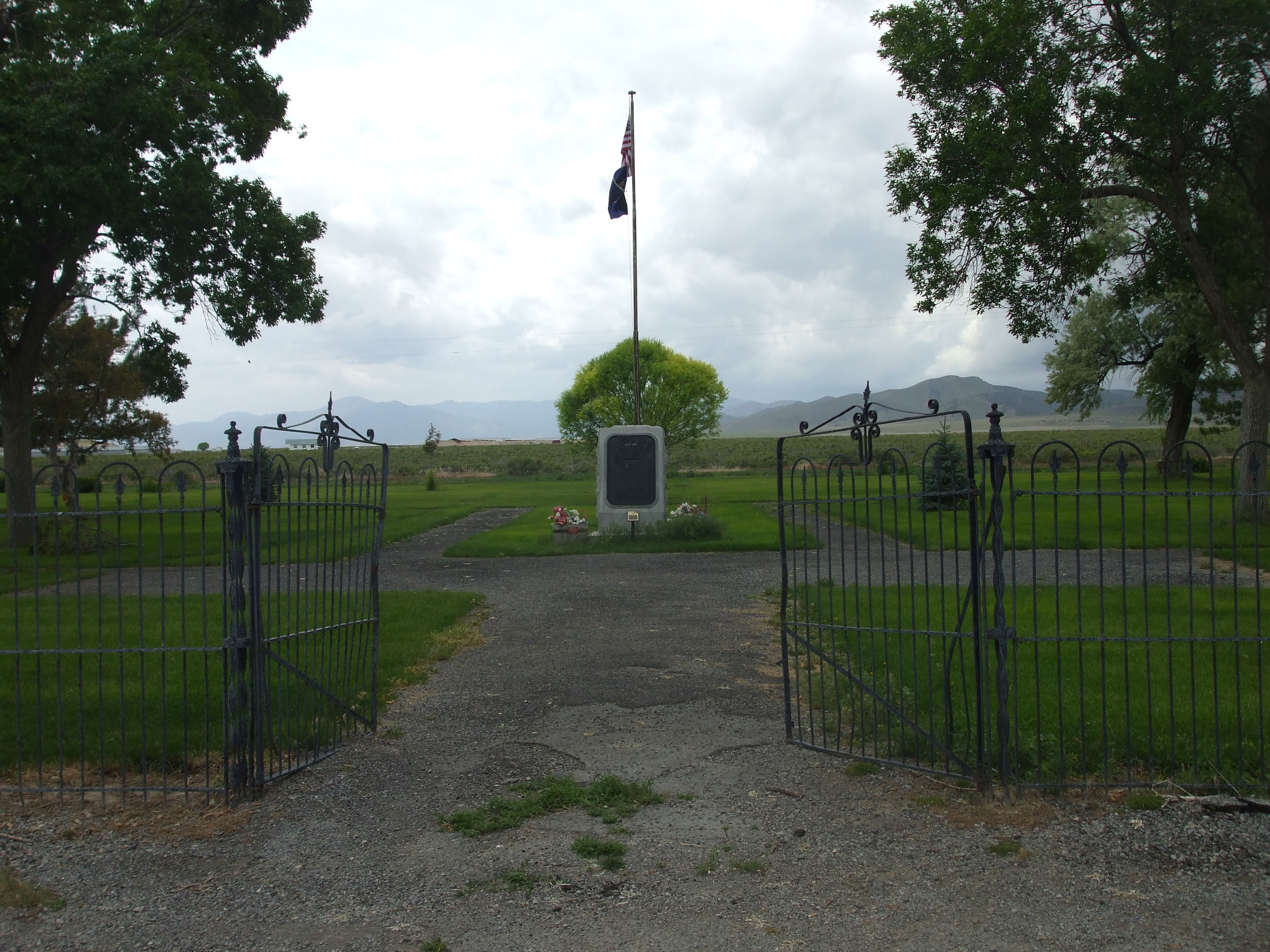
- Camp Floyd Cemetery, June 2009
- Location: Fairfield, Utah; United States
- Coordinates: 40°15′26″N 112°6′14″W
- Area: 40 acres (16.2 ha)
- NRHP reference No.: 74001939
- Added to NRHP: November 11, 1974
- Stagecoach Inn
- U.S. National Register of Historic Places
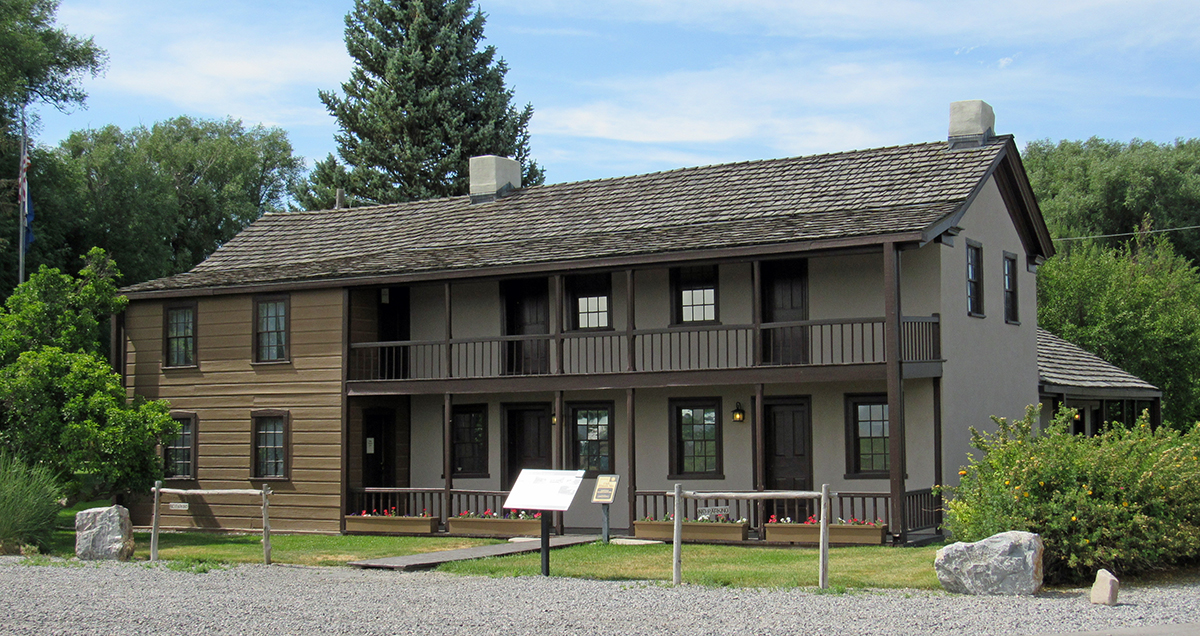
- Stagecoach Inn, June 2015
- Location: 69 West Main Street; Fairfield, Utah; United States
- Coordinates: 40°15′41″N 112°5′34″W
- Area: 1.4 acres (0.6 ha)
- NRHP reference No.: 71000857
- Added to NRHP: May 14, 1971

Camp Floyd State Park Museum (formerly known as Camp Floyd / Stagecoach Inn State Park and Museum) is a state park in the town of Fairfield, Utah County, Utah, United States. The park includes part of the former Camp Floyd site (including the Camp Floyd Cemetery), the Stagecoach Inn, and the Fairfield District School. All three components are listed separately on the National Register of Historic Places. Park headquarters are located at the Stagecoach Inn, with all park areas less than three-quarters of a mile (1.2 km) away. The heritage park reflects the settlement of Utah and its resolution of ongoing conflicts with the federal government.

== History ==
The Carson family donated the Stagecoach Inn to the state government on January 29, 1958, with the understanding that the Utah State Park and Recreation Commission would restore the building for use as a museum. The state also acquired the Walker Brothers' commissary building and post cemetery. By the 1950s, the commissary building was in ruins, with the locals having dismantled parts of it (the roof was gone by 1948).

The renovated cemetery was dedicated on June 11, 1960. The renovation and restoration of both the inn and commissary were completed in the summer of 1960, but the park was not officially dedicated and opened until May 16, 1964.

== Camp Floyd ==
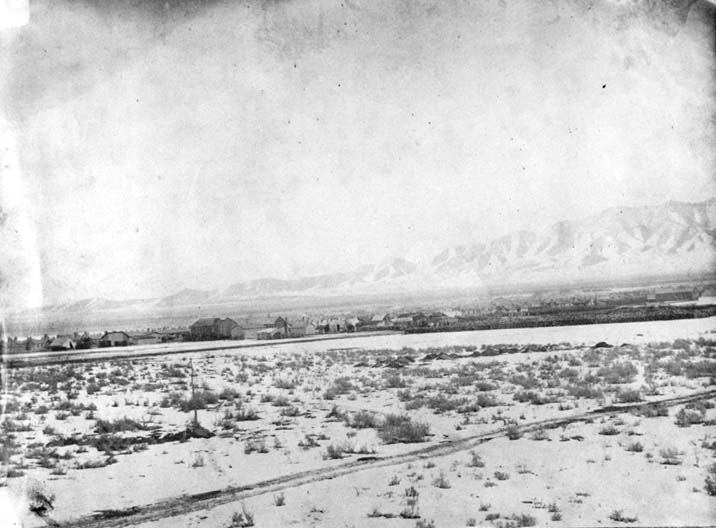
Camp Floyd, January 1859. By Samuel C. Mills, photographer with the Simpson Expedition

Established in July 1858 by a U.S. Army detachment under the command of Brevet Brig. Gen. Albert Sidney Johnston, Camp Floyd was named for then Secretary of War John B. Floyd. The detachment consisted of more than 3,500 military and civilian employees, including cavalry, artillery, infantry and support units. This unit, the largest single troop concentration then in the United States, was sent by President James Buchanan to stop a perceived Mormon rebellion, which came to be known as the Utah War.

From Fort Leavenworth, Kansas, the army marched to Fort Bridger, Wyoming where it spent the winter of 1857. Troops arrived in Salt Lake City, Utah in June 1858. Soon after their arrival, troops settled in the Cedar Valley area and eventually Fairfield, where 400 buildings were constructed by November 1858. A series of photographs of Camp Floyd, taken by Samuel C. Mills in January 1859, show the post as a cluster of adobe buildings including barracks, officers quarters, warehouses and other sundry structures. Enough civilians soon followed to increase the town size to 7000, almost half that of Salt Lake City. The rebellion never took place, leaving the army with routine garrison duty that included protecting the stagecoach and Pony Express routes, preventing Indian marauding, and mapping and surveying responsibilities.

Supplying the large garrison, 1,100 miles (1,800 km) from Fort Leavenworth, was costly. It was rumored to be an attempt by Secretary of War Floyd (a known southern sympathizer) to drain the federal treasury. A contract with the firm of Russell, Majors and Waddell for delivery of 16 million pounds (7.3 kt) of freight required 3,500 wagons, 40,000 oxen, 1,000 mules and more than 4,000 men. This same company formed the Pony Express, which had a station in Fairfield.

After Secretary of War Floyd resigned on Dec. 29, 1860 (becoming a Confederate), Camp Floyd was renamed Fort Crittenden, after Kentucky's Senator John J Crittenden, who worked to prevent Kentucky's secession from the Union. Camp Floyd/Crittenden was abandoned in July 1861 with the garrison being called east for the American Civil War. Equipment and buildings were sold, destroyed or transported. All that remain today are the military cemetery and one commissary building. Two months after the army's departure, only 18 families remained in Fairfield.

A 40-acre (16 ha) area was listed on the NRHP as Camp Floyd Site November 11, 1974. The only vestige of the post in 1974 was a cemetery.

== Fairfield District School ==
The Fairfield District School is a historic schoolhouse that was built in 1898, that was added to the NRHP August 6, 1987. It is located at 59 North Church Street.

== Stagecoach Inn ==
The Stagecoach Inn has also been known as John Carson House. It served as a hotel and as a stop on the overland stagecoach until the transcontinental railroad opened in 1869. It was the first stop south of Salt Lake City on the overland route. During 1860–1861 the inn was also a Pony Express stop. The area immediately surrounding is also known as the Stage Coach Inn State Historical Site. It was added to the NRHP May 14, 1971.

== See also ==
- List of Utah state parks
- National Register of Historic Places listings in Utah County, Utah
- Cedar Fort, Utah
- Fort Douglas, Utah
- Soldier Summit, Utah
- James H. Simpson
- John Buford
