= Cedar Fort School =

- U.S. National Register of Historic Places
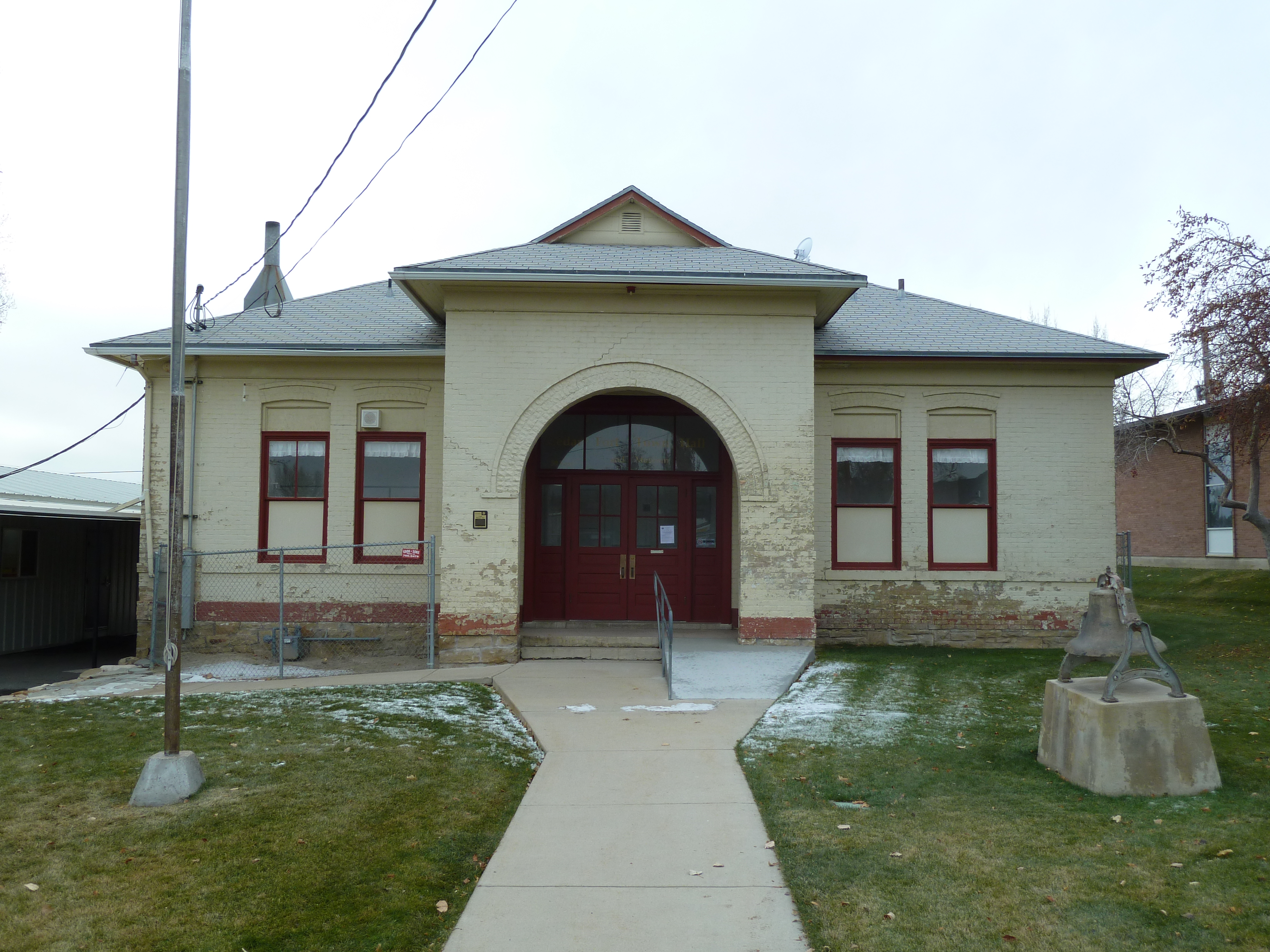
- The Cedar Fort School, November 2014

- Location within Utah Location within the United States
- Location: 40 East Center Street; Cedar Fort, Utah; United States
- Coordinates: 40°19′37″N 112°6′19″W
- Area: 1.2 acres (0.49 ha)
- Built: 1909
- Built by: Gibbs, Matthew & Sons
- Architectural style: Late Victorian, Prairie School
- NRHP reference No.: 00000357
- Added to NRHP: April 6, 2000

The Cedar Fort School is a historic two-room schoolhouse on Center Street in the center of Cedar Fort, Utah, United States. The structure was built in 1909 and reflects a Victorian Eclectic style with some Prairie School elements. It was listed on the National Register of Historic Places in 2000.

== See also ==
- National Register of Historic Places listings in Utah County, Utah
