= Samuel C. Mills =

American photographer (1833–1911)

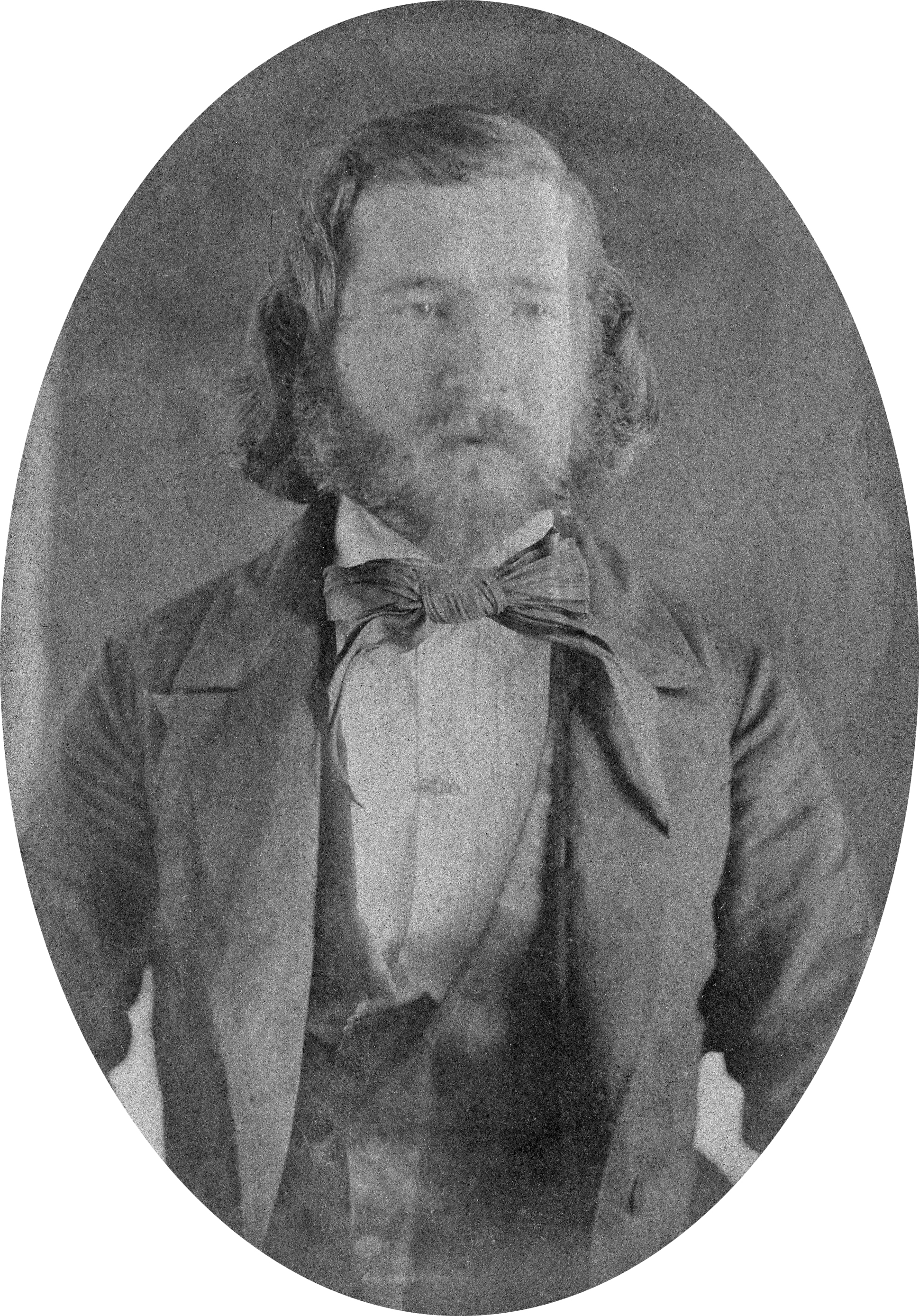
- Samuel C. Mills in Utah, 1858–59. National Archives.
- Born: October 8, 1833; Washington, D.C.
- Died: October 7, 1911 (aged 77); Washington, D.C.
- Resting place: Congressional Cemetery, Washington, D.C.
- Occupation: Photographer

Samuel C. Mills (October 8, 1833 – October 7, 1911) was an American photographer, Civil War veteran, and a D.C. judge. He is best known for his 1858 photographs from along the Oregon Trail and California Trail.

== Early years ==
Born October 8, 1833, in Washington, D.C., he was the son of John and Mary Mills. As a young man, he worked in his father's shoe factory. In 1856, he began working in the photography studio of Blanchard P. Paige on Pennsylvania Avenue in D.C.

== On the Road to Utah, 1858 ==
In February 1858, Captain James H. Simpson, an officer in the U.S. Army's Corps of Topographical Engineers, was assigned to the reinforcements being sent to Utah Territory as part of the so-called Utah War. Simpson decided that one of his first projects would be to remap the main emigrant trail on his way to Utah and to create a new guidebook for the Army and civilian emigrants. Having become interested in the photographs of the Crimean War by British photographers Roger Fenton and James Robertson, Simpson decided that he would "illustrated some of the more notable features of the route by photographic impressions." If successful, his would be the first emigrant guidebook illustrated through the lens of a camera.

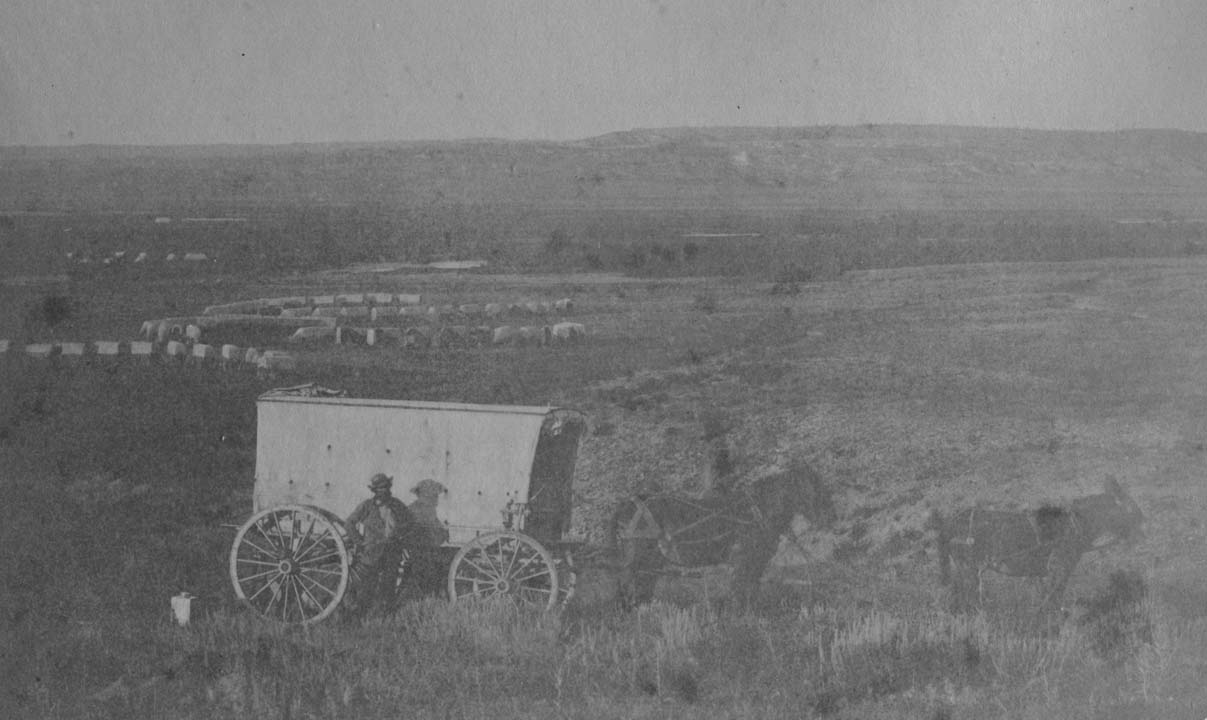
The expedition's instrument wagon near Fort Laramie, 1858. By Mills. Library of Congress.

In late March 1858, Captain Simpson submitted a request to hire a photographer at $40 per month and an assistant photographer at $25 per month, exclusive of their traveling expenses. He then hired twenty-five year old Mills as his expedition photographer and Edward Jagiello as his assistant. They departed in April 1858 and camped for a month at Fort Leavenworth to complete their planning and to test out their equipment. The wood crates packed with instruments, including their new camera, arrived on April 28. Captain Simpson noted in his diary that Mills and Jagiello were soon practicing, producing views of an artillery battery at the post. Among Mills and Jagiello's surviving photographs are three views of buildings at Fort Leavenworth.

The expedition departed Fort Leavenworth on May 31, 1858, and headed west, with Mills producing photographs along the way. At Fort Kearny, Captain Simpson turned over the supervision of his topographical party to his most senior lieutenant, J. L. Kirby Smith, while he traveled in advance as a member of General William S. Harney's staff. Among the instructions that Simpson left for Smith was specific guidance for the expedition's artists. "Photographic pictures of as many prominent scenes as possible will also be taken," Simpson wrote, "including Fort Kearney, Court House & Chimney Rocks, Fort Laramie & every other proper object or scene." Later on the trail, Simpson sent back instructions for Smith to get a good view of Ash Hollow, noting that such "would make a fine illustration for the report." He again emphasized the importance of securing "as many views taken of remarkable topographical and geological features of the region traversed as possible... even if the party is delayed by it."

Lieut. Smith's small survey party complied. "Stopped at Court House Rock on our road today," wrote one of the members of the expedition in his diary on July 25, "and Mills (the photographer) took a picture." Extant images confirm that the photographers produced negatives of a number of important landmarks along their route—today the earliest surviving views from along the Oregon-California Trail.

=== Views From the Main Emigrant Trail, Summer 1858 ===
By Mills and Jagiello

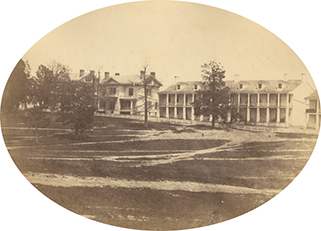
Barracks at Fort Leavenworth, Kansas Territory, May 1858.

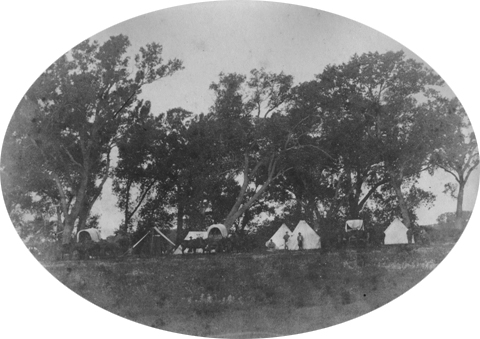
Camp on Little Blue River, Nebraska Territory, June 1858.

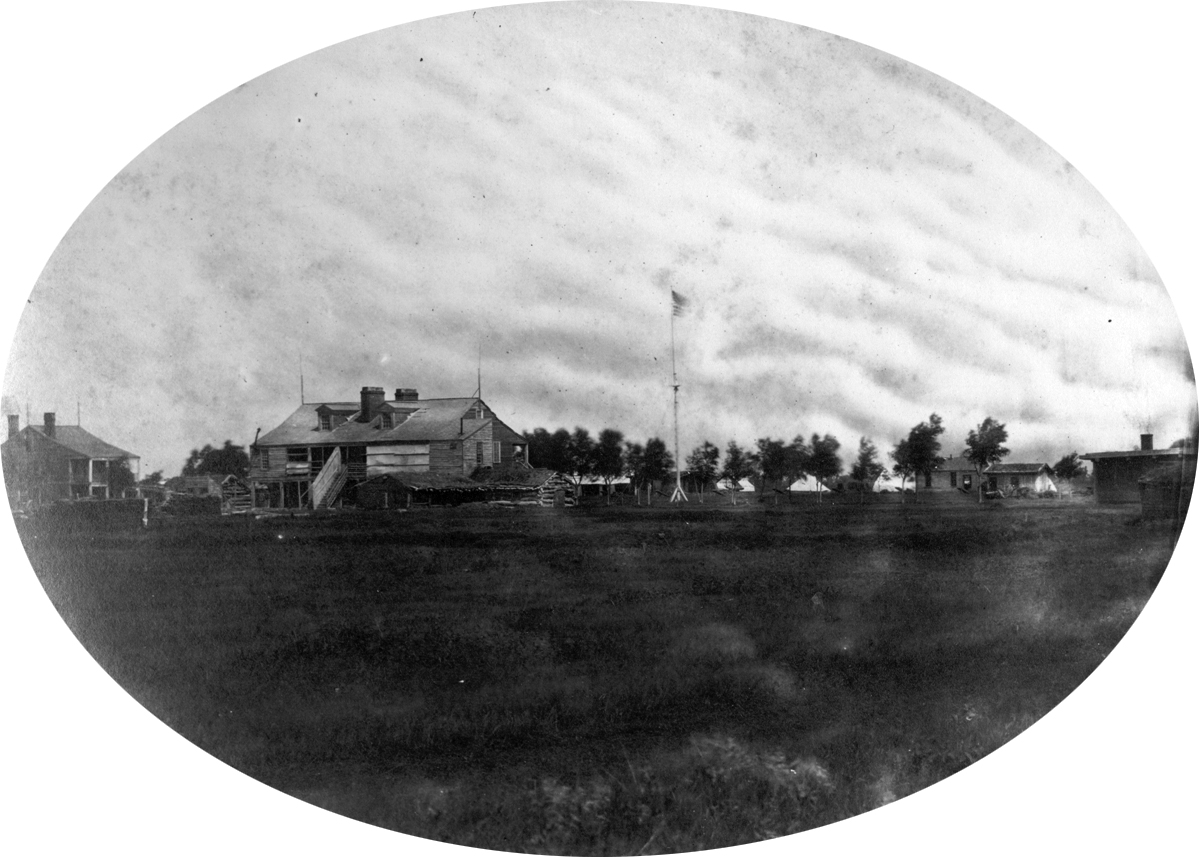
Fort Kearny, Nebraska Territory, June 1858.

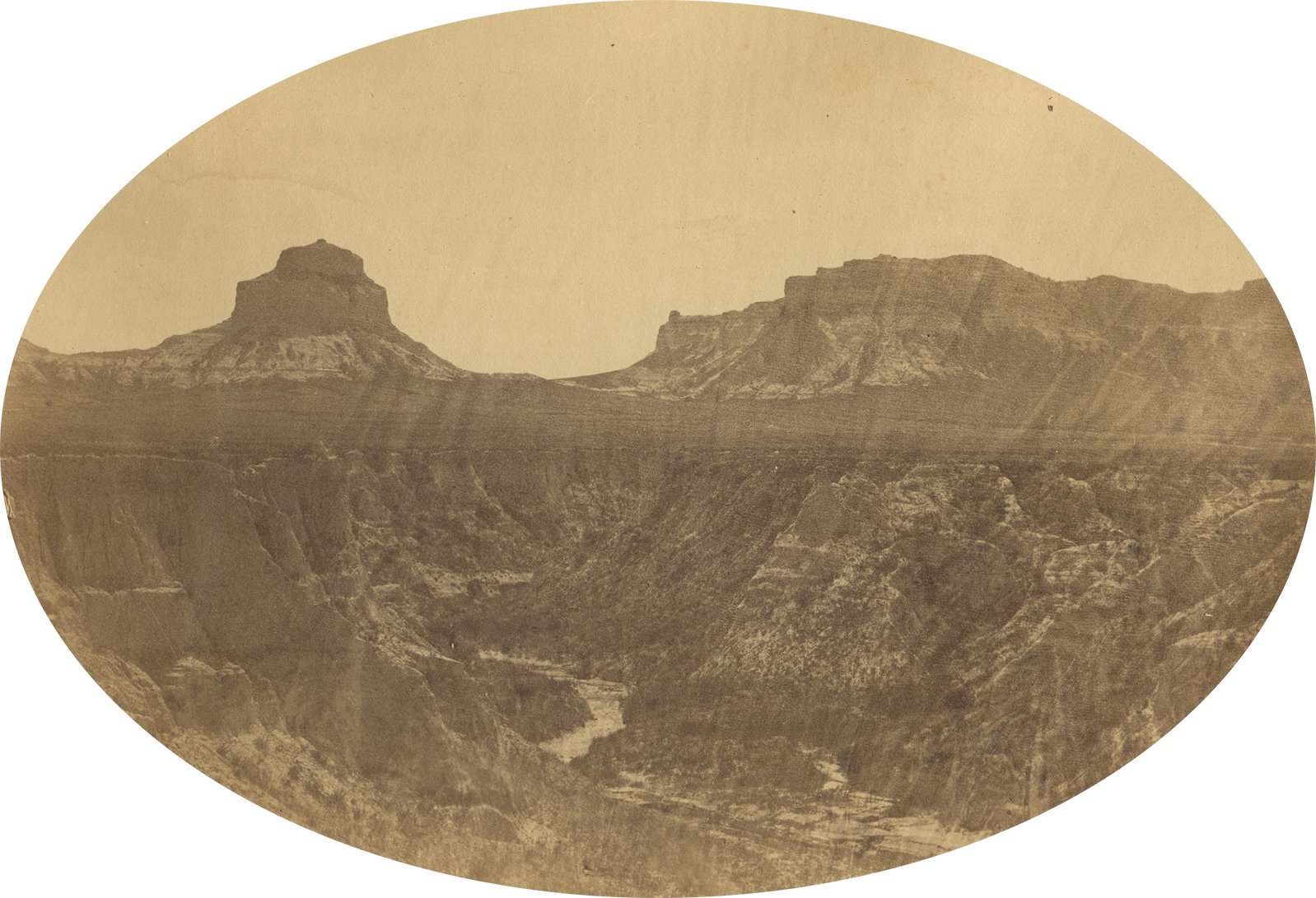
Scotts Bluff, Nebraska Territory, July 1858.

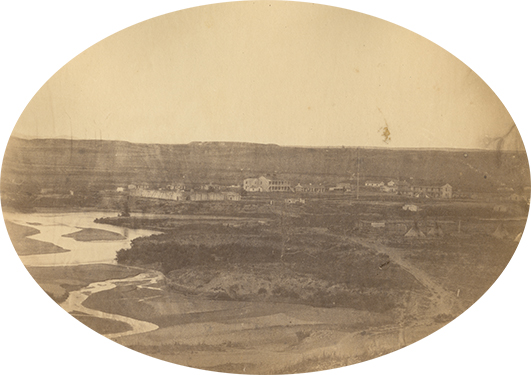
Fort Laramie, Nebraska Territory, late July-early Aug., 1858.

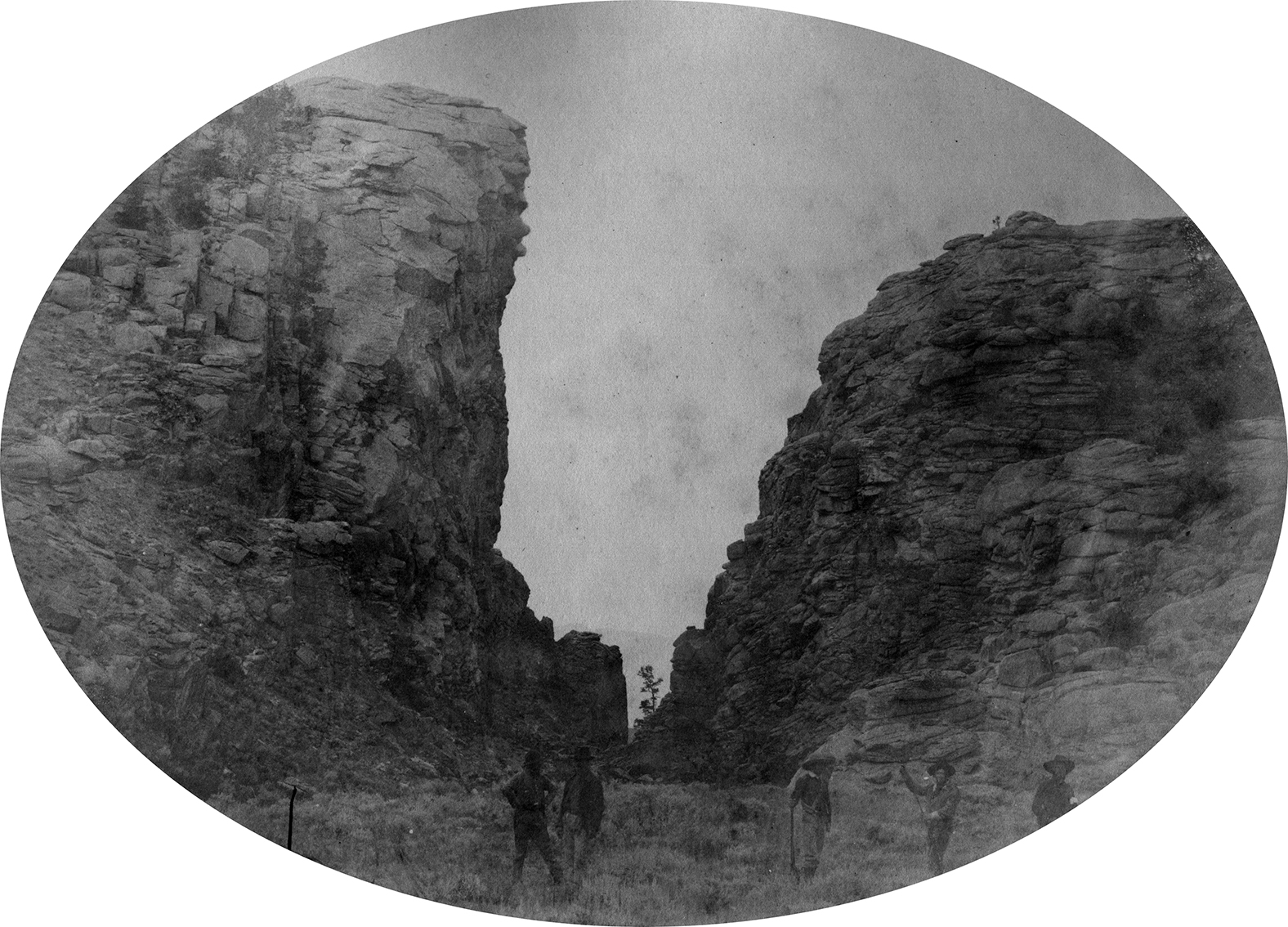
Devil's Gate, Nebraska Territory, August 1858.

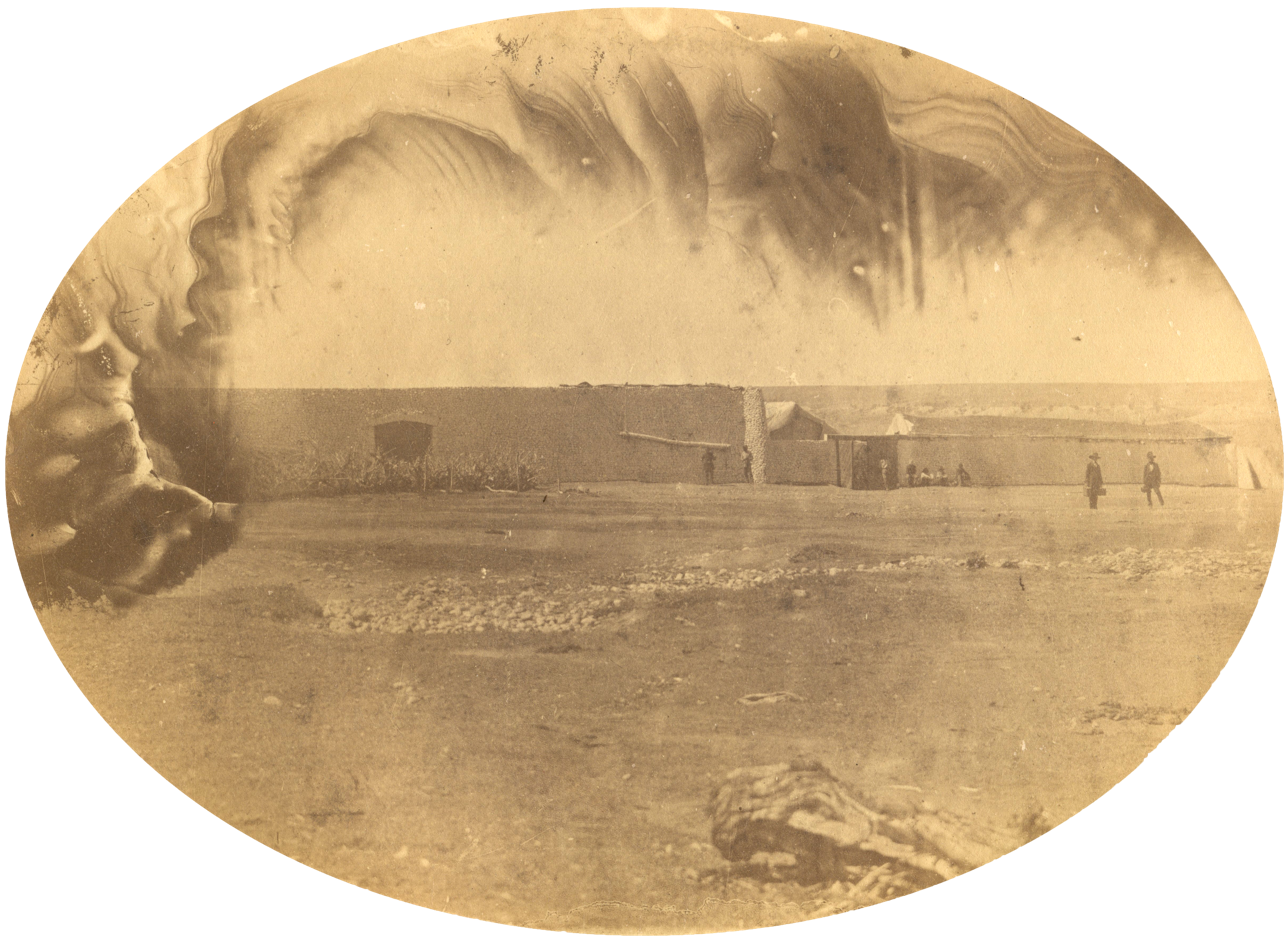
Fort Bridger, Utah Territory, probably Sept. 1858.

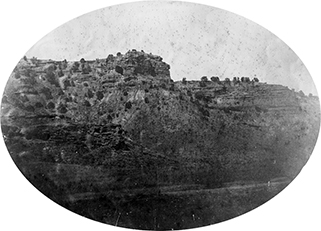
Head of Echo Canyon, Utah Territory, Sept. 1858.

== At Camp Floyd, 1858-59 ==
After three and a half long months on the road, the topographical party finally arrived at Camp Floyd, Utah Territory, on September 15, 1858. Simpson immediately sent Smith's party back out to help establish a new road between Camp Floyd and Fort Bridger through Timpanogos or Provo Canyon and they spent several months surveying the boundaries of the new military reservations at Fort Bridger, Camp Floyd, and Rush Valley. Returning to Camp Floyd, Simpson and his crew then drafted a lengthy report describing the roads of Utah Territory, complete with a detailed map.

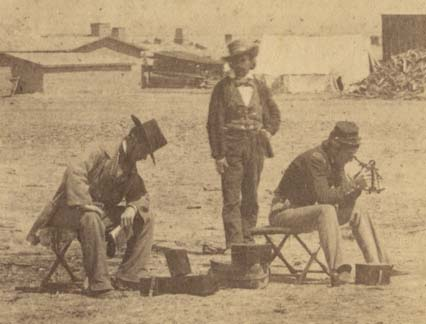
Surveyors at Camp Floyd, Utah. By Mills, photographer with the Simpson Expedition. Courtesy Library of Congress.

As the survey team finally settled in at Camp Floyd for the winter, Mills and Jagiello were provided with a room for use as a photographic studio in one of the numerous adobe and wood structures just built at the post. Up to this point, the photographers had only produced "negative impressions on glass." Now inside their simple darkroom, they began creating paper prints from the negatives. In addition, Simpson had one of his young subordinates, Lieutenant Haldimand S. Putnam, create a detailed map of Camp Floyd while he instructed Mills to take a number of views of this sprawling military encampment, at that time the largest military garrison in the country. Mills and his assistant produced a number of views of Camp Floyd.

By early 1859, Simpson was increasingly concerned about his rapidly dwindling supply of photographic chemicals as well as about the dependability of his young photographer. A teetotaler himself, Simpson had become impatient with Mills' drinking habits and warned him on several occasions after he had become too incapacitated to perform his official duties. Finally on Jan. 19, 1859, following another incident at Camp Floyd, Simpson terminated Mills' employment with the expedition "to protect the Government and myself from imposition and wrong." Mills pleaded for another chance and the officer finally acquiesced but with a stern warning against any further violations.

The following day on Jan. 20, a small delegation of Utes led by the prominent leader and Mormon convert Arapeen, arrived at Camp Floyd to meet the post commander, General Albert S. Johnston. "The council broke up harmoniously, the Indians shaking hands, &c," Simpson noted in his diary. "They then adjourned to the photographic room where I had their likenesses taken in a group." The following day, Mills produced a portrait of Arapeen and at least one view of the delegation standing in front of a Sibley tent.

Looking back later upon his photographic experiment, Simpson characterized it as a failure. "The cause lies in some degree in the difficulty, in the field, at short notice, of having the preparations perfect enough to insure good pictures," Simpson wrote in his final report, and "chiefly in the fact that the camera is not adapted to distant scenery." He concluded that "a good artist, who can sketch readily and accurately, is much to be preferred." In May 1859 as he set off on the next leg of his explorations across the Great Basin, Simpson left his photographer behind at Camp Floyd and instead used a sketch artist for the remainder of his expedition.

Simpson's party returned to Camp Floyd in early September 1859 and they soon began their return journey to the east coast, taking Mills with them. No photographs from this portion of the trip are known, suggesting that the camera and equipment had been packed away. The delicate glass plate negatives presumably were safely transported to War Department headquarters, though what ultimately became of them is not known. Mills' employment with the government ended upon their arrival back home.

=== Views Illustrative of Camp Floyd, U.T., January, 1859. ===
By Mills and Jagiello.

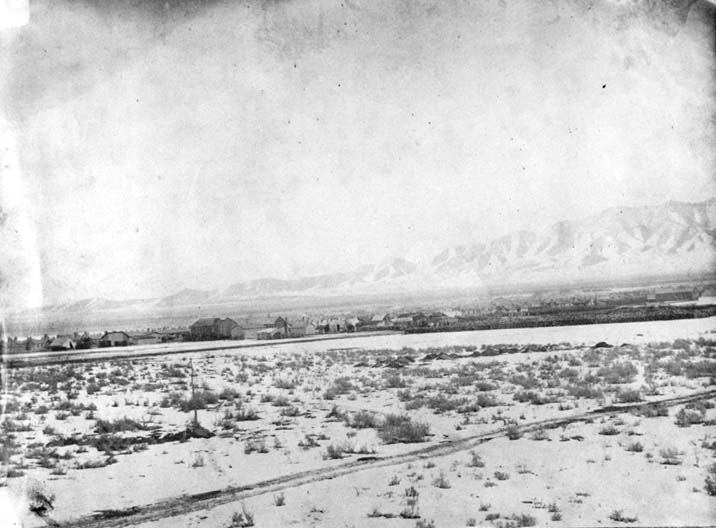
View of Middle Portion of Camp Floyd from 10th Infantry Target, Looking North of East, Jan. 1859.

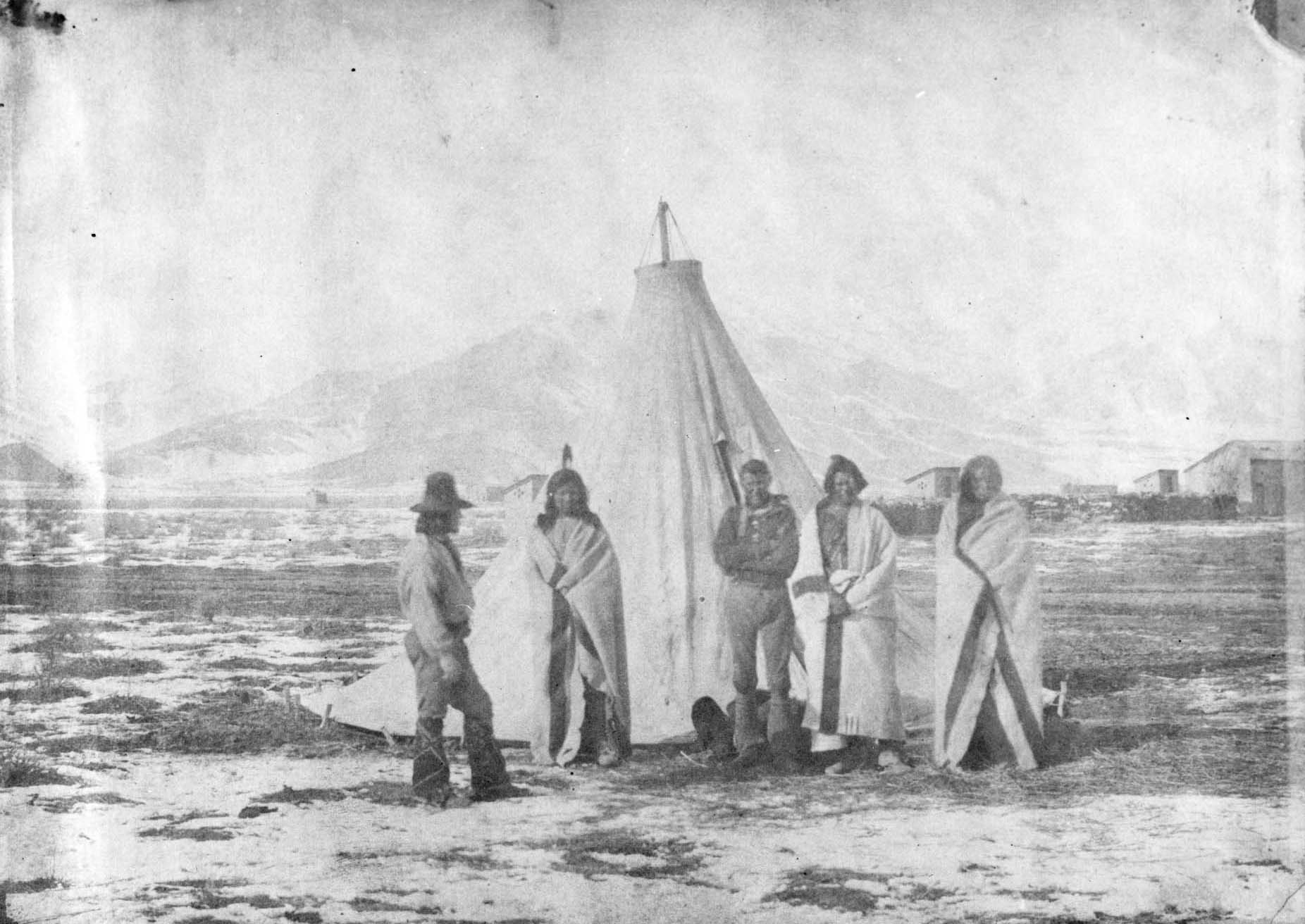
A Group of Utah Indians, including Arrapene (Sinnearoach), the head chief of the tribe, and Luke, the interpreter, taken on the outskirts of Camp Floyd, looking north west towards the Oquirrah Mountains.

== Later history ==
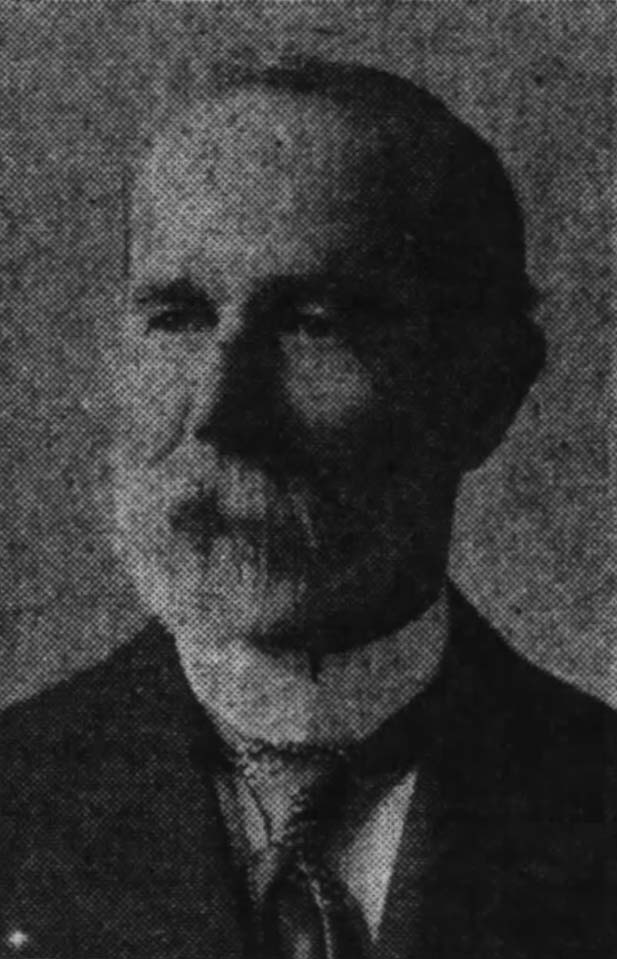
Judge Samuel C. Mills. Courtesy The Washington Post, Oct. 15, 1905.

After his return to D.C., Mills went back to work at Paige's studio on Pennsylvania Avenue. As the Civil War began, he was busy taking portraits of soldiers in the wartime capital. In 1864, Mills enlisted in the Union Army as a hospital steward and after the war ended, he returned to photographic work. Meanwhile, he studied law, passed the bar in 1872, and was appointed as a police judge in the district, a position he held for the remainder of his working life. In later years, Mills was an active member of the Grand Army of the Republic and the Masonic Order. The hard-learned lessons of his youth regarding alcohol may have been the impetus for his founding the Sons of Jonadab, a temperance organization. Samuel Mills died on October 7, 1911, and was buried in the Congressional Cemetery in Washington, D.C.

== Bibliography ==
- Dickson, Ephriam D. III, "Shadowy Figures About Whom Little is Known: Artists of the Simpson Expedition, 1858-59," Utah Historical Quarterly, vol. 83 no. 4 (Fall 2015), 270–289.
- Petersen, Jesse G., A Route for the Overland Stage: James H. Simpson's 1859 Trail Across the Great Basin (Logan: Utah State University Press, 2008).
- Simpson, James H., Report of Explorations Across the Great Basin of the Territory of Utah for a Direct Wagon Route from Camp Floyd to Genoa, in Carson Valley, in 1859 (Washington, D.C.: Government Printing Office, 1876).
