= Cedar Fort, Utah =

- Town
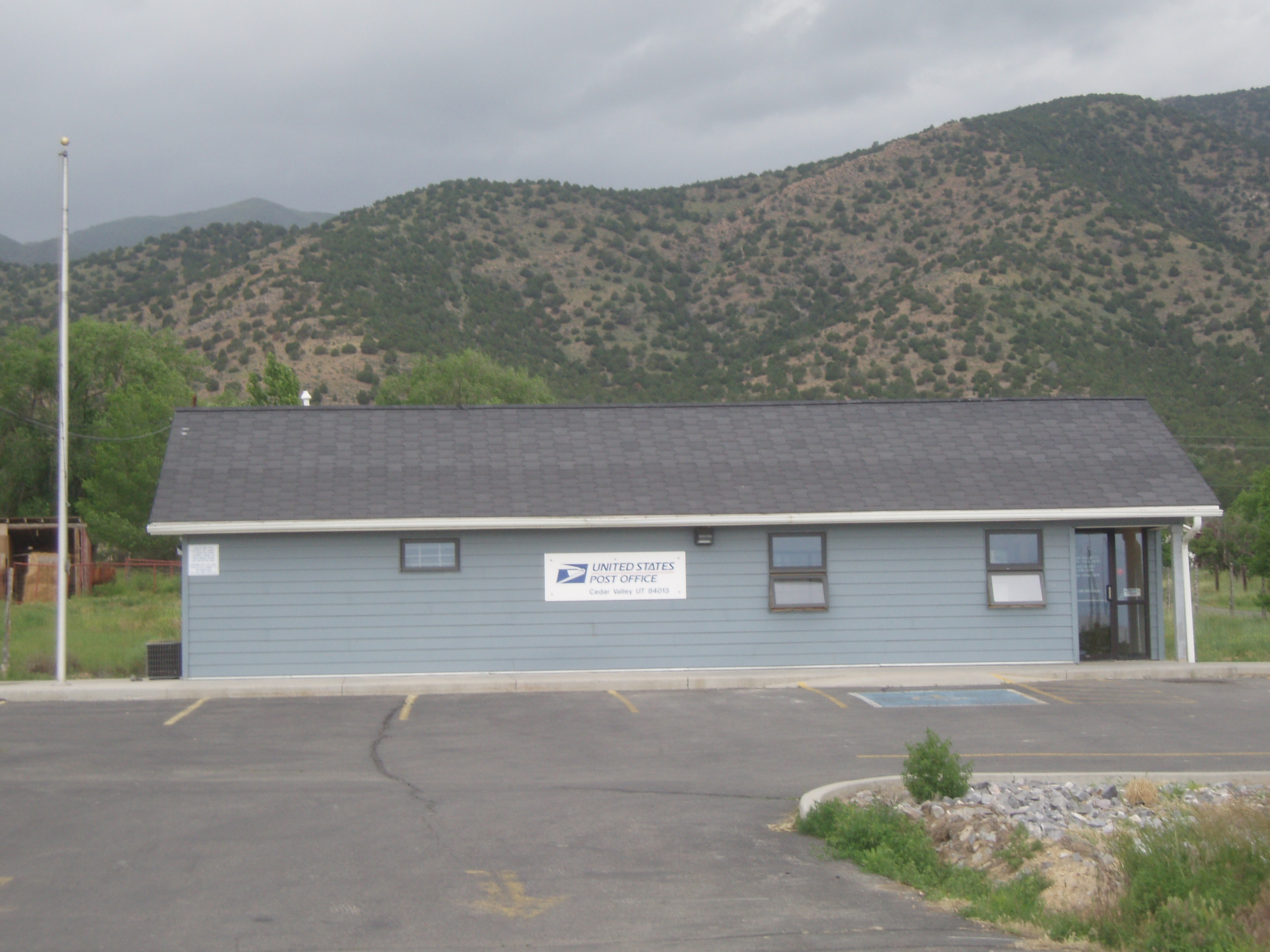
- Cedar Valley Post Office, June 2009

- Location in Utah County and the state of Utah
- Coordinates: 40°21′50″N 112°07′20″W
- Country: United States
- State: Utah
- County: Utah
- Settled: 1852
- Incorporated: May 17, 1965
- Named for: Juniper ("cedar") trees

Area
  - Total: 21.38 sq mi (55.37 km^{2})
  - Land: 21.38 sq mi (55.37 km^{2})
  - Water: 0 sq mi (0.00 km^{2})
- Elevation: 5,351 ft (1,631 m)

Population (2020)
  - Total: 427
  - Density: 20.0/sq mi (7.71/km^{2})
- Time zone: UTC-7 (Mountain (MST))
  - Summer (DST): UTC-6 (MDT)
- ZIP code: 84013
- Area codes: 385, 801
- FIPS code: 49-11430
- GNIS feature ID: 2413183
- Website: www.townofcedarfort.com

Cedar Fort is a town in Utah County, Utah, United States. It is part of the Provo–Orem Metropolitan Statistical Area. The population was 427 at the 2020 census.

== Geography ==
According to the United States Census Bureau, the town has a total area of 21.2 square miles (55.0 km^{2}), all land.

== Demographics ==
Historical population
Census	Pop.	Note	%±
1870	272		—
1880	250		−8.1%
1890	176		−29.6%
1900	218		23.9%
1910	236		8.3%
1920	178		−24.6%
1930	177		−0.6%
1940	208		17.5%
1950	213		2.4%
1970	188		—
1980	269		43.1%
1990	284		5.6%
2000	341		20.1%
2010	368		7.9%
2020	427		16.0%
U.S. Decennial Census

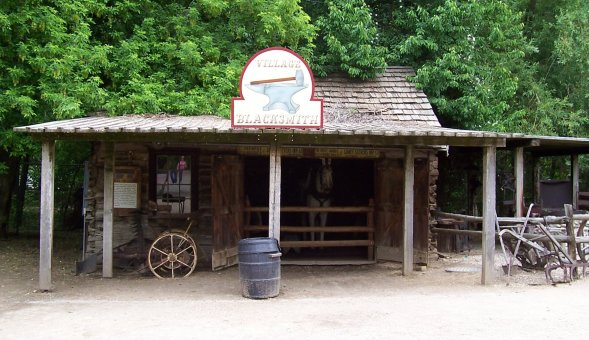
Built in Cedar Fort in 1858, this blacksmith shop served the needs of the troops stationed at nearby Camp Floyd. The building was relocated to the Pioneer Village inside the Lagoon Amusement Park in Farmington, Utah.

At the 2000 census, there were 341 people, 101 households, and 83 families in the town. The population density was 16.1 people per square mile (6.2/km^{2}). There were 110 housing units at an average density of 5.2 per square mile (2/km^{2}). The racial makeup of the town was 95.89% White, 0.59% Native American, 0.29% Asian, 0.29% Pacific Islander, 0.29% from other races, and 2.64% from two or more races. Hispanic or Latino of any race were 0.88%.

Of the 101 households, 43.6% had children under 18, 76.2% were married couples living together, 4.0% had a female householder with no husband present, and 17.8% were non-families. 16.8% of households were one person, and 10.9% were one person aged 65 or older. The average household size was 3.38, and the average family size was 3.87.

The age distribution was 36.1% under the age of 18, 8.8% from 18 to 24, 24.0% from 25 to 44, 19.6% from 45 to 64, and 11.4% 65 or older. The median age was 29 years. For every 100 females, there were 101.8 males. For every 100 females aged 18 and over, there were 101.9 males.

The median household income was $44,773, and the median family income was $45,833. Males had a median income of $40,000 versus $25,500 for females. The per capita income for the town was $14,266. About 5.4% of families and 11.3% of the population were below the poverty line, including 18.5% of those under age 18 and 7.5% of those aged 65 or over.

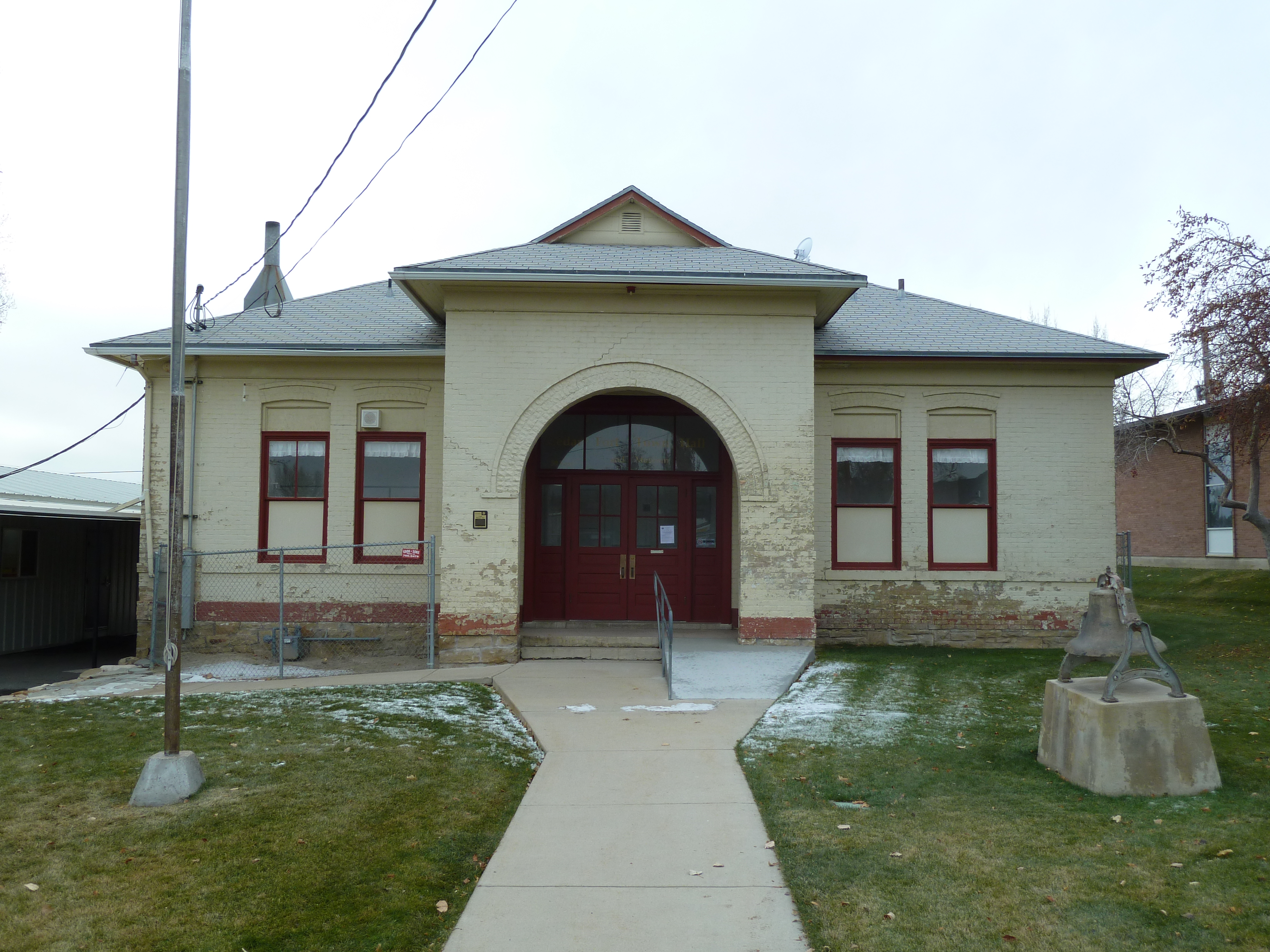
Cedar Fort School, November 2014

== Education ==
Cedar Fort is part of the Alpine School District. The only school in town is Cedar Valley Elementary. Older students attend schools in Eagle Mountain and Saratoga Springs.

== See also ==
- List of cities and towns in Utah
- Camp Floyd
