= Red Cloud Agency =

Indian agency in the United States (1871–1878)

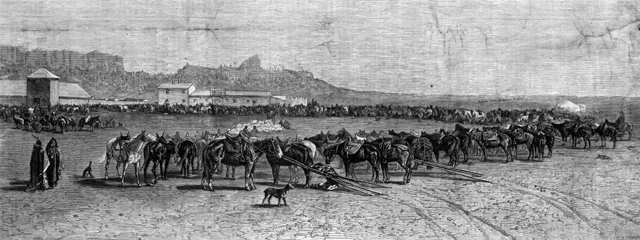
Red Cloud Agency. Drawing by Ivan Pranishnikopf, from photographs. Published in Harper's Illustrated Weekly, May 18, 1876.

The Red Cloud Agency was an Indian agency for the Oglala Lakota, as well as the Northern Cheyenne and Arapaho, from 1871 to 1878. It was located at three different sites in Wyoming Territory and Nebraska before being moved to South Dakota. It was then renamed the Pine Ridge Reservation.

== Red Cloud Agency No. 1 (1871–1873) ==
As stipulated in the Fort Laramie Treaty (1868), the US government built Indian agencies for the various Lakota and other Plains tribes. These were forerunners to the modern Indian reservations.

In 1871, the Red Cloud Agency, named for Red Cloud, was established on the North Platte River near Fort Laramie. Two years later it was moved to northwest Nebraska, then five years after that, to South Dakota.

== Red Cloud Agency No. 2 (1873–1877) ==
In August 1873, the agency was moved to the northwestern corner of Nebraska, near the present town of Crawford. Constructed on a hill overlooking the White River, the agency buildings included a large warehouse, offices, home for the agent, blacksmith shop and stables for horses. A schoolhouse was later added. Two trading stores were also built adjacent to the agency.

On 8 February 1874, agency clerk Frank Appleton was killed by the Miniconjou Lone Horn of the North. Fort Laramie General John E. Smith was called by Saville to deal with three hundred Sioux braves besieging the agency. Smith eventually established a small army post near the agency called Fort Robinson.

The Red Cloud Agency was the center of much activity during the Great Sioux War of 1876–77. In May 1877, Crazy Horse and allied leaders came with their people to the Red Cloud Agency for surrender. Following the killing of Crazy Horse, the agency was moved further west.

The site of Red Cloud Agency No. 2 is included in Fort Robinson and Red Cloud Agency, a United States National Historic Landmark.

== Red Cloud Agency No. 3 (1877–1878) ==
In October 1877, the agency was moved to the White River in present-day south-central South Dakota.

== Pine Ridge Agency ==
In 1878, the Red Cloud Agency was relocated to southern South Dakota and renamed the Pine Ridge Indian Reservation.

== Indian agents ==
- James Wham
- Jared Daniels
- Dr. John J. Saville, a physician from Sioux City, Iowa, arrived as agent in the fall of 1873. During his administration, the army established a post nearby. The first treaty negotiations for the Black Hills were held between the US government and the Lakota. Accused of graft, Saville resigned as agent in late 1875, although a commission investigation had cleared him of wrongdoing.
- Valentine McGillycuddy
- James S. Hastings
- Lieut. Charles A. Johnson
- Dr. James Irwin
