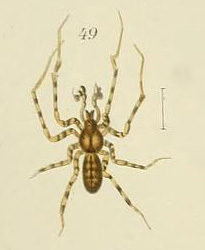
- male W. contortipes

Scientific classification
- Kingdom: Animalia
- Phylum: Arthropoda
- Subphylum: Chelicerata
- Class: Arachnida
- Order: Araneae
- Infraorder: Araneomorphae
- Family: Linyphiidae
- Genus: Weintrauboa; Hormiga, 2003

Species
- See text

= Weintrauboa =

Genus of spiders

Weintrauboa is a genus of spiders in the family Linyphiidae. Originally described as part of the family Pimoidae, the genus was transferred to Linyphiidae in 2021 based on molecular phylogenetic studies.

== Etymology ==
The genus name honors Professor Robert L. Weintraub (1912–1996), a benefactor of the systematics programme at The George Washington University.

== Taxonomy and phylogeny ==
Weintrauboa was established in 2003 by Gustavo Hormiga to accommodate two species from Japan that had previously been classified in the linyphiid genus Labulla. These species were found to possess characteristics typical of the family Pimoidae rather than Linyphiidae, leading to the creation of this new genus within Pimoidae.

However, subsequent molecular phylogenetic studies revealed that Weintrauboa, along with the genus Putaoa, did not group with the core pimoid genera Pimoa and Nanoa. Instead, these genera were found to be more closely related to linyphiid spiders. In 2021, Hormiga and colleagues formalized the transfer of Weintrauboa and Putaoa from Pimoidae to Linyphiidae, placing them in an expanded subfamily Stemonyphantinae. This reclassification redefined Pimoidae to include only Pimoa and Nanoa.

Within Stemonyphantinae, Weintrauboa forms a clade with Putaoa, Pecado, and Stemonyphantes, which represents the sister group to all other linyphiids.

== Description ==
Weintrauboa are small to medium-sized spiders with a total length of 4.9–6.0 mm in males and 4.7–8.0 mm in females. The cephalothorax is longer than wide, measuring 2.2–2.9 mm in males and 2.1–3.1 mm in females, with a conspicuous thoracic groove. The clypeus height is 1.38–1.5 times the diameter of the anterior median eyes.

The chelicerae are large and lack stridulatory striae, bearing three prolateral and three to four retrolateral teeth. Males have distinctively enlarged and sinuous bases of the first metatarsus, with a row of enlarged setae. The opisthosoma is ovoid and dark brown to grey with lighter markings.

Male reproductive structures include complex pedipalps with a finger-like distal end of the cymbium, a heavily sclerotized dorsoectal cymbial process without cuspules, and cuspules arranged in rows on the dorsal surface of the cymbium. The embolic process is compact rather than filiform or lamelliform as in Pimoa.

== Natural history ==
The web architecture of W. contortipes has been documented and illustrated, showing the typical sheet web construction characteristic of linyphioid spiders.

== Distribution ==
Species of Weintrauboa are found across East Asia, from Russia (Far East and Sakhalin) and Japan to China. The genus shows a pattern of distribution that extends from the original Japanese and adjacent island localities where it was first discovered to mainland China, where most recently described species have been found.

== Species ==
As of September 2025, the genus contains ten recognized species:

- Weintrauboa chikunii (Oi, 1979) – Japan
- Weintrauboa contortipes (Karsch, 1881) – Russia (Far East), Japan
- Weintrauboa denticulata Gao, Irfan & Wang, 2025 – China
- Weintrauboa insularis (Saito, 1935) – Russia (Sakhalin), Japan
- Weintrauboa linguiforma Yang & Chen, 2019 – China
- Weintrauboa plana Xu & Li, 2009 – China
- Weintrauboa pollex Xu & Li, 2009 – China
- Weintrauboa shenwu Gao, Irfan & Wang, 2025 – China
- Weintrauboa wanglangensis Gao, Irfan & Wang, 2025 – China
- Weintrauboa yele Hormiga, 2008 – China
- Weintrauboa yunnan Yang, Zhu & Song, 2006 – China
