= Spring Creek (West Deep Creek tributary) =

Stream in the state of Utah

Spring Creek formerly known as West Creek, and Round Valley Creek, is a stream, tributary to West Deep Creek in White Pine County, Nevada with its source in Juab County, Utah.

Spring Creek has its source in Juab County, Utah, at an elevation of 7,841 feet (2,390 meters) on the north slope of Spring Creek Mountain at 39°50′12″N 114°02′01″W. From there it flows northwest across the Spring Creek Flat into Nevada to join an unnamed stream to form West Deep Creek, at an elevation of 5,525 feet (1,684 meters) near Eightmile, Nevada the former site of Eightmile Station, (a Pony Express then a stagecoach station of the Overland Mail Company), eight miles northwest of Goshute, Utah.
