= Cedar Pass =

Coordinates: 39°45′49″N 114°09′58″W

Cedar Pass is a gap between Tippett Canyon and Pleasant Valley in White Pine County, Nevada. These valleys divide the South Mountains from the Kern Mountains. It is lies at an altitude of 7,264 feet (2,214 meters).
