= Deep Creek Valley =

Valley in Utah, United States

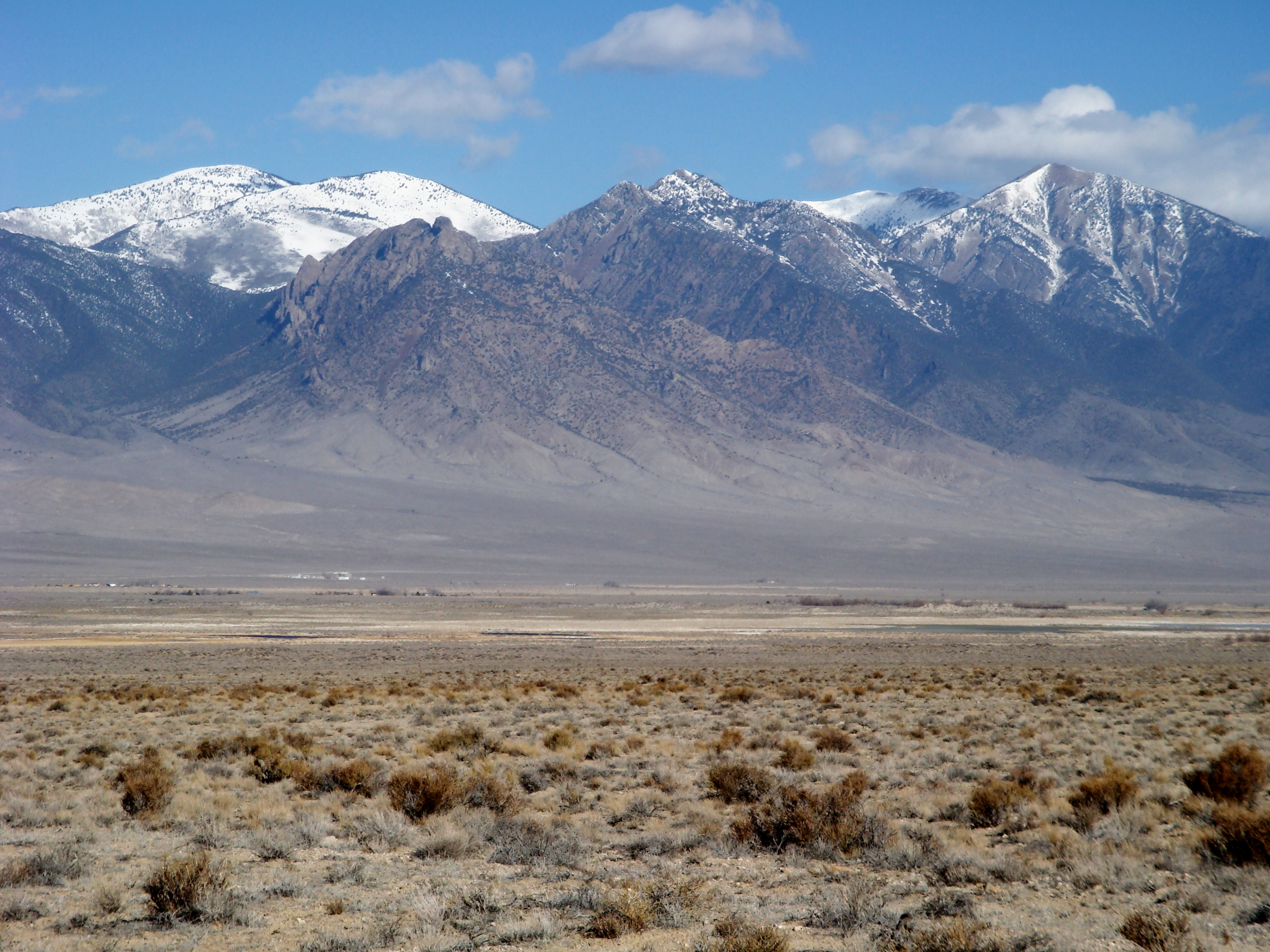
- View southeasterly across valley, west flank Deep Creek Mountains

- Location within Utah
- Length: 35 mi (56 km) N-S
- Width: 4 mi (6.4 km)

Geography
- Country: United States
- State: Utah
- Regions: Great Basin; Great Salt Lake Desert
- Counties: Tooele; Juab
- Communities: Ibapah; Gold Hill
- Borders on: List: Great Salt Lake Desert; Gold Hill, Utah; Deep Creek Mountains; Antelope Valley; Ferber Hills
- Coordinates: 40°10′37″N 113°59′49″W
- Rivers: Deep Creek; East Deep Creek
- Interactive map of Deep Creek Valley

Deep Creek Valley is a 35-mile (56 km) long valley located in southwest Tooele County at the Utah-Nevada border; the extreme south of the valley is in northwest Juab County. The valley parallels the west flank of the Deep Creek Range, both north-trending. In the north-northeast, its outlet widens into the southwest of the Great Salt Lake Desert region.

The mountain range turns southwest and west in the south, and encloses the higher altitude terrain of the valley; here, the Goshute Indian Reservation lies in the mountains and the Deep Creek Valley's south; the community of Goshute is adjacent the valley; the reservation also extends westward into Nevada, into the east of the Antelope Valley.

== Description ==
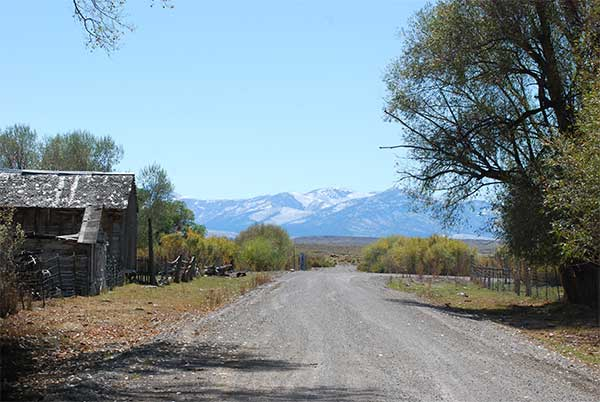
View in Ibapah, UT

Deep Creek Valley follows the drainage of the north-flowing Deep Creek. In the valley's southern half, from Ibapah, UT on Deep Creek, at the northwest of the Deep Creek Range, and south, (East Deep Creek), to Goshute in the mountains, nine canyons and washes feed the Deep Creek system from the Deep Creek Range. Hills west, about 7-9 mi of drainage, from Antelope Valley's east perimeter, washes flow east or northeast.

The Deep Creek Valley is narrow, only about 4 mi, but follows circuitous routes around small hills, as well as Gold Hill northeast, and the Ferber Hills, northwest on the Nevada-Utah border. On Deep Creek, at the south of these two hill regions, and with the northwest convergence of the Deep Creek Range, is White Sage Flat. Washes and creeks converge here at the Flat, but Deep Creek continues on north-flowing.

The center of the valley is between White Sage Flat, and Ibapah, 40°02′12″N 113°59′07″W to the south.

Deep Creek Station (AKA, Egan's Station) was one of the most important stretches in the pony express route. It was run by Howard Egan who was supintendent for the route.

== See also ==
- List of valleys of Utah
