= Ferber Hills =

Hill range in the state of Utah

Ferber Hills is a range of hills in Elko County, Nevada and Tooele County, Utah. The range is formed in three parallel ridges of hills trending northwest to southeast. Its highest summit is Utah Peak, in the center of the central ridge of the range, at an elevation of 6,680 feet (2,040 meters), just east of the state line in Tooele County, Utah. Its second highest Summit is Ferber Peak, that rises to and elevation of 6,601 feet (2,012 meters), at the south end of the southernmost ridge of the range at 40°12′43″N 114°03′18″W just west of the state line in Elko County, Nevada. The highest point in the smaller northernmost ridge is an unnamed summit at 40°17′12″N 113°59′48″W with an elevation of 5,745 feet (1,751 meters) in Tooele County.

The range is divided from the Goshute Mountains badlands to the west and southwest by White Horse Flat and Ferber Flat. It is bounded on the east by Deep Creek Valley and Deep Creek that gives it its name, that divides it from the Deep Creek Range.
