= Native American languages of Utah =

Utah, a state in the western United States that straddles the intersection of the Colorado Plateau, the Great Basin, and the Rocky Mountains, has been the traditional home of several Uto-Aztecan bands from a few tribes that are considered Paiute and Shoshone. The Shoshone in Utah belong to the Goshute and Northern Shoshone linguistic group, while the various Paiute peoples either belong to the Ute or Southern Paiute linguistic classifications. As such, in total, there are two Native American languages spoken in Utah: Shoshone and Colorado River Numic.

== Distribution ==
There are two Native American languages currently spoken in Utah. Population estimates are based on figures from Ethnologue and U.S. Census data, as given in sub-pages below. The two languages are shown in the table below:

Language	Classification	Number of Speakers	Total Ethnic Population	Tribe(s) Included	Location(s) in Utah	Significant External Populations
Shoshone	Uto-Aztecan: Numic: Central Numic	2,000	12,300	Goshute, Northern Shoshone	Skull Valley Indian Reservation, Goshute Indian Reservation, Washakie Indian Reservation	Idaho, Wyoming, Nevada
Colorado River Numic	Uto-Aztecan: Numic: Southern Numic	2,000	5,000	Ute, Southern Paiute	Uintah and Ouray Indian Reservation, Ute Mountain Indian Reservation, Paiute Indian Tribe of Utah (Cedar Band Indian Reservation, Indian Peaks Band Indian Reservation, Kanosh Band Reservations, Koosharem Band Reservations, Shivwits Indian Reservation)	Nevada, Colorado, Arizona, California

== Minority Languages ==
- Navajo language is spoken on the Navajo Nation, which is split between Arizona, New Mexico, and Utah, in order of decreasing land area present in each respective state. Navajo is an Athabaskan language.

== See also ==
- Native Americans in the United States
- Indigenous peoples of the Great Basin
- Indigenous languages of the Americas
- Uto-Aztecan languages
