= Woodman Peak =

Woodman Peak may refer to:

- Woodman Peak (Utah), a summit in Tooele County, Utah
- Woodman Peak (California), a summit in Mendocino County, California
