= West Deep Creek (Deep Creek, Tooele County, Utah) =

West Deep Creek also known as Round Valley Creek, Spring Creek and West Creek is a tributary stream with its head at the confluence of Spring Creek and an unnamed stream, in White Pine County, Nevada, and its mouth in Tooele County, Utah at its confluence with East Deep Creek that forms the head of Deep Creek.

The head of West Deep Creek, at the junction of Spring Creek and an unnamed stream, is located at 39°58′29″N 114°04′19″W. It flows northeastward into Utah to join East Deep Creek to form the head of Deep Creek, 0.96 km (0.6 mi) southwest of Ibapah, Utah.
