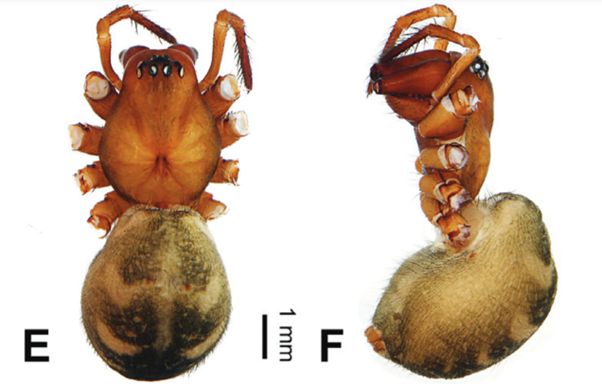
- Female holotype

Scientific classification
- Kingdom: Animalia
- Phylum: Arthropoda
- Subphylum: Chelicerata
- Class: Arachnida
- Order: Araneae
- Infraorder: Araneomorphae
- Family: Pimoidae
- Genus: Pimoa
- Species: P. danba

Binomial name
- Pimoa danba Zhang & Li, 2021
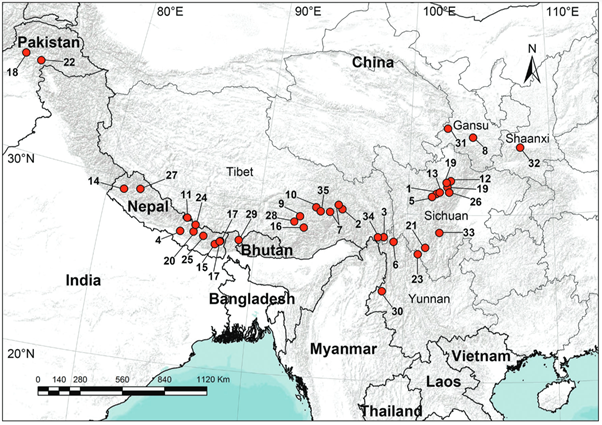
- Pimoa danba has the number 5

= Pimoa danba =

Species of spider

Pimoa danba is a species of true spider in the family Pimoidae. It is found in China.

== Distribution ==
As of 2021, the species is only known from three female specimens, so not much is known about its distribution. The specimens were found in Geshizha Township, Danba County, Sichuan Province in China.

== Etymology ==
The specific epithet is derived from the type locality, the Danba County, China.
