= Dutch Mountain =

Dutch Mountain may mean: A summit:

- Dutch Mountain (Arizona) a summit in Apache County, Arizona
- Dutch Mountain (Maine) a summit in Waldo County, Maine
- Dutch Mountain (Pennsylvania) a summit in Wyoming County, Pennsylvania
- Dutch Mountain (Kinney County, Texas) a summit in Kinney County, Texas
- Dutch Mountain (Llano County, Texas) a summit in Llano County, Texas
- Dutch Mountain (Utah) a summit in Tooele County, Utah
