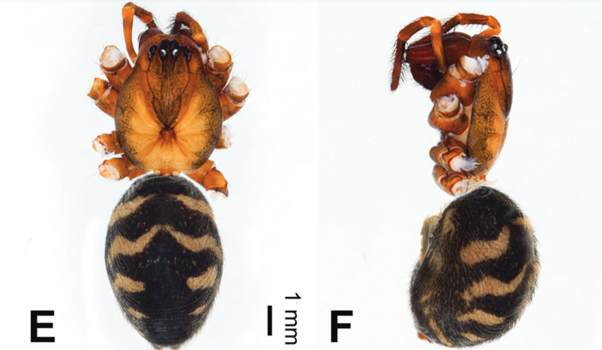
- Habitus of female holotype

Scientific classification
- Kingdom: Animalia
- Phylum: Arthropoda
- Subphylum: Chelicerata
- Class: Arachnida
- Order: Araneae
- Infraorder: Araneomorphae
- Family: Pimoidae
- Genus: Pimoa
- Species: P. daman

Binomial name
- Pimoa daman Zhang & Li, 2021
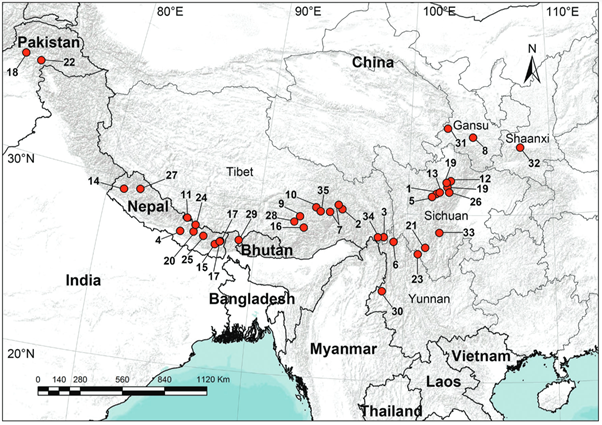
- P. daman has the number 4

= Pimoa daman =

Species of spider

Pimoa daman is a species of true spider in the family Pimoidae. It is found in Nepal.

== Distribution ==
As of 2021, this species is only known from one female specimen, so not much is known about the distribution. It was found in a forest near Panorama Resort in Daman, Narayani District, Nepal at an elevation of around 2401 m (7877 ft).

== Etymology ==
The specific epithet is derived from the type locality, Daman in the Narayani District.
