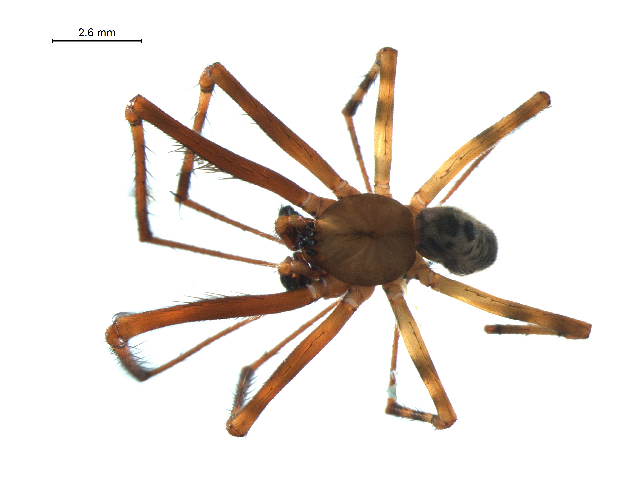
- P. altioculata, adult male
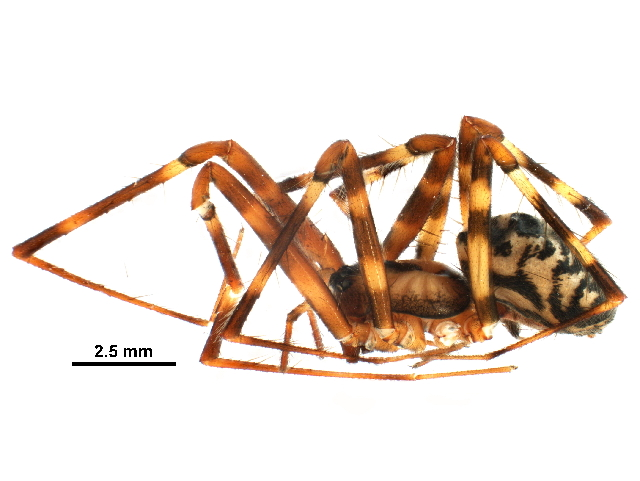
- P. altioculata, adult female

Scientific classification
- Kingdom: Animalia
- Phylum: Arthropoda
- Subphylum: Chelicerata
- Class: Arachnida
- Order: Araneae
- Infraorder: Araneomorphae
- Family: Pimoidae
- Genus: Pimoa
- Species: P. altioculata

Binomial name
- Pimoa altioculata (Keyserling, 1886)

= Pimoa altioculata =

Species of spider

Pimoa altioculata is a species of true spider in the family Pimoidae. It is found in the United States and Canada.
