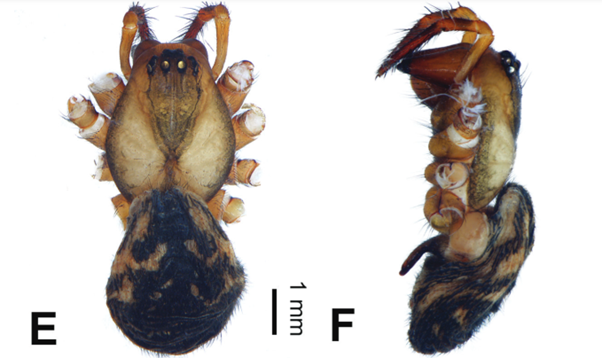
- Female habitus

Scientific classification
- Kingdom: Animalia
- Phylum: Arthropoda
- Subphylum: Chelicerata
- Class: Arachnida
- Order: Araneae
- Infraorder: Araneomorphae
- Family: Pimoidae
- Genus: Pimoa
- Species: P. cawarong

Binomial name
- Pimoa cawarong Zhang & Li, 2021
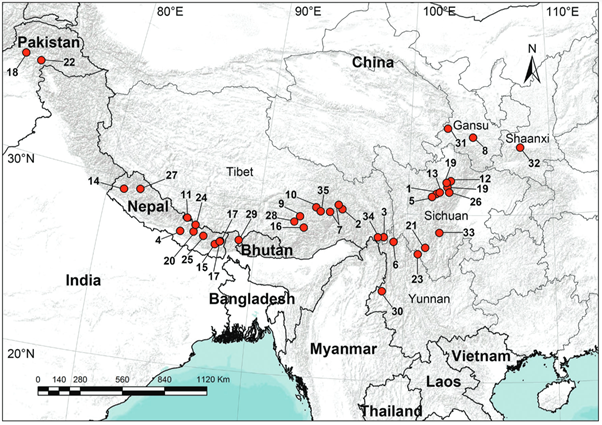
- P. cawarong has the number 3

= Pimoa cawarong =

Species of spider

Pimoa cawarong is a species of true spider in the family Pimoidae. It is found in China.

== Etymology ==
The specific epithet is derived from the type locality, the Cawarong Township in the Zayu County of Tibet.
