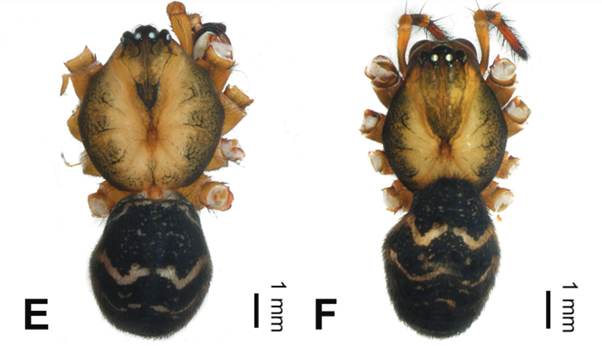
- Male (left) Female (right)

Scientific classification
- Kingdom: Animalia
- Phylum: Arthropoda
- Subphylum: Chelicerata
- Class: Arachnida
- Order: Araneae
- Infraorder: Araneomorphae
- Family: Pimoidae
- Genus: Pimoa
- Species: P. bomi

Binomial name
- Pimoa bomi Zhang & Li, 2021
- [[File:[Distribution map of 35 Different Pimoa species.png|frameless]]
- P. bomi has the number 2 on the map.

= Pimoa bomi =

Species of spider

Pimoa bomi is a species of true spider in the family Pimoidae. It is found in China.

== Etymology ==
The specific epithet is derived from the type locality, the Bomi County.
