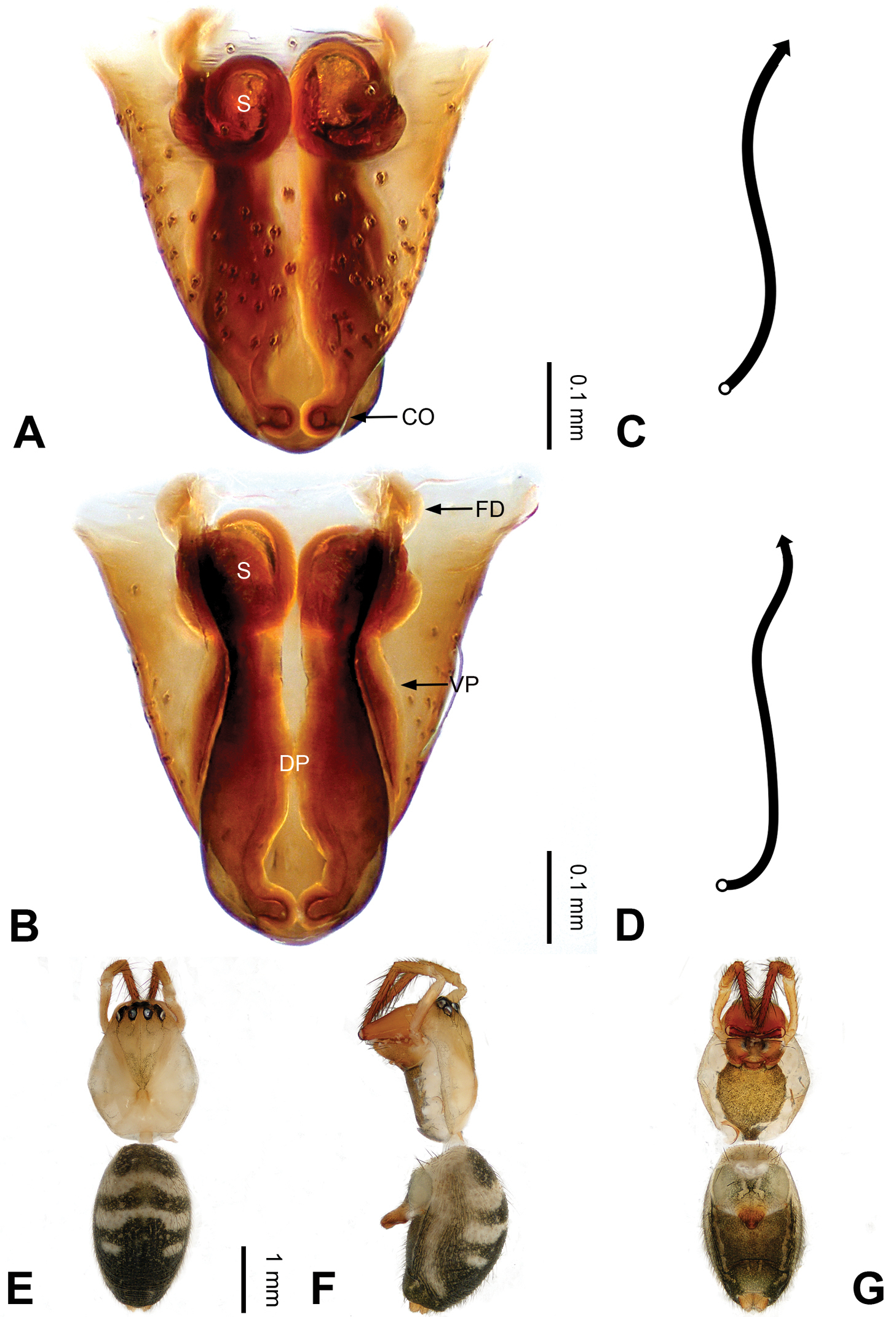

Scientific classification
- Kingdom: Animalia
- Phylum: Arthropoda
- Subphylum: Chelicerata
- Class: Arachnida
- Order: Araneae
- Infraorder: Araneomorphae
- Family: Pimoidae
- Genus: Pimoa
- Species: P. dongjiu

Binomial name
- Pimoa dongjiu Zhang & Li, 2021
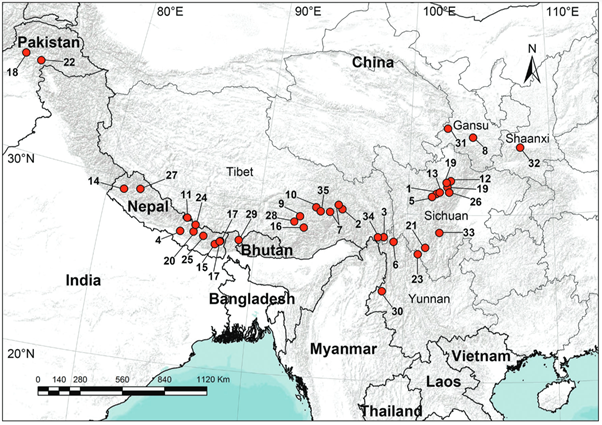
- P. dongjiu has the number 7

= Pimoa dongjiu =

Species of spider

Pimoa dongjiu is a species of true spider in the family Pimoidae. It is found in China.

== Distribution ==
Not much is known about the distribution of this species, as only a single male and a single female have been collected. They were collected in Dongjiu Village, Lunang Town, Nyingchi, Tibet, China at an elevation of 3199 m (10495 ft).

== Etymology ==
The specific epithet is derived from the type locality, the Dongjiu Village.
