= Johnson Canyon =

Johnson Canyon may mean:

A canyon:

In the United States:

- Johnson Canyon (Juab County, Utah)
- and 60 other places in the United States
