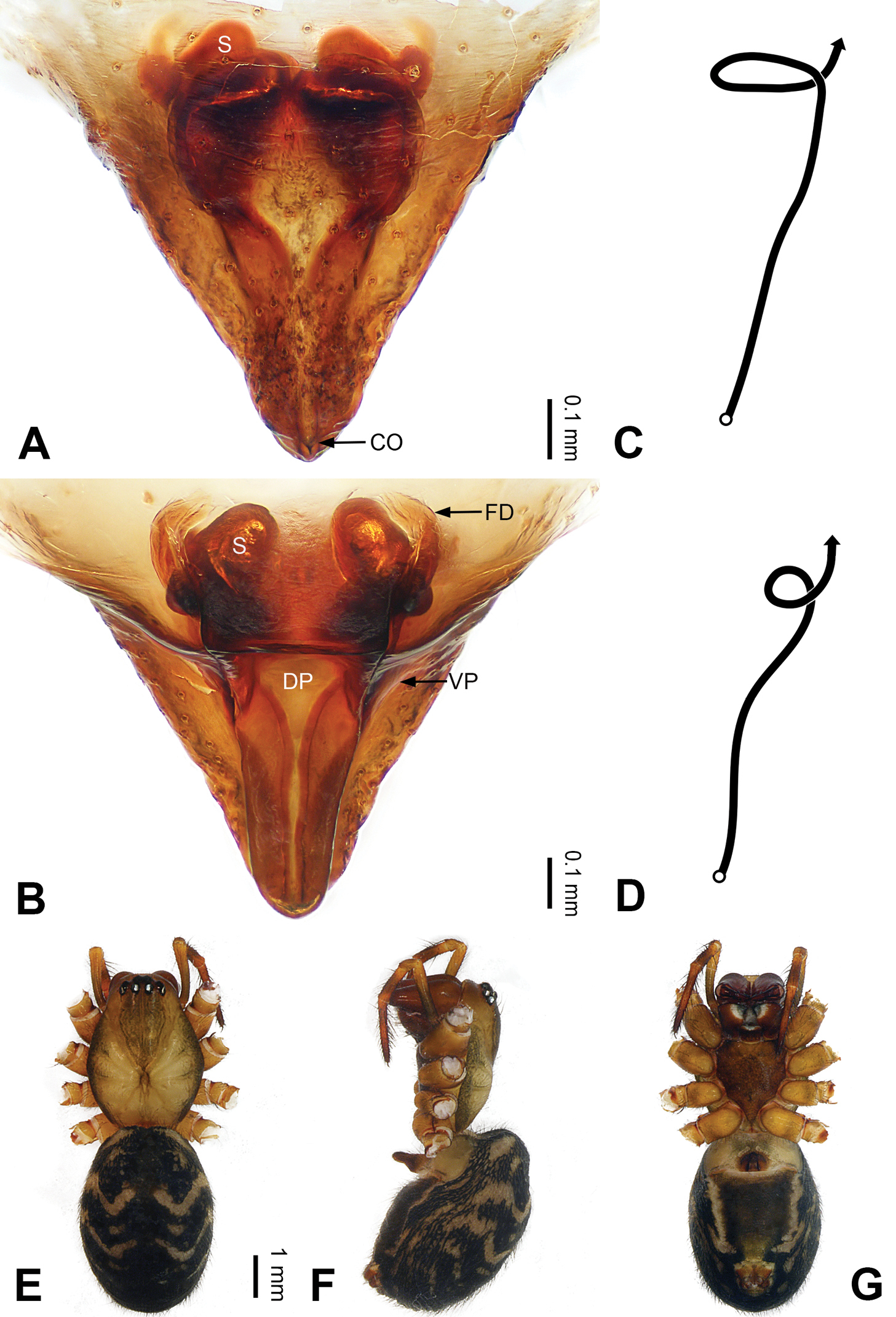

Scientific classification
- Kingdom: Animalia
- Phylum: Arthropoda
- Subphylum: Chelicerata
- Class: Arachnida
- Order: Araneae
- Infraorder: Araneomorphae
- Family: Pimoidae
- Genus: Pimoa
- Species: P. gyaca

Binomial name
- Pimoa gyaca Zhang & Li, 2021
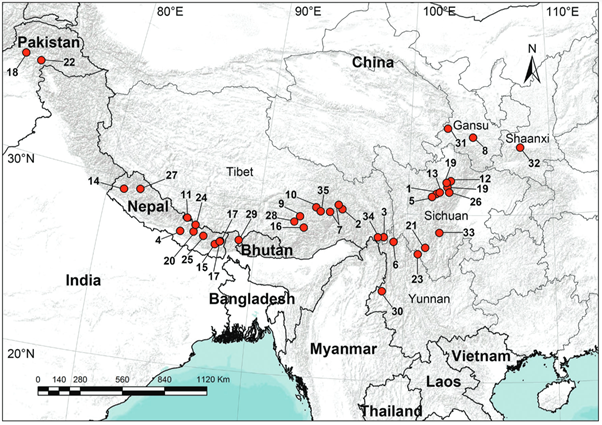
- P. gyaca has the number 9

= Pimoa gyaca =

Species of spider

Pimoa gyaca is a species of true spider in the family Pimoidae. It is found in China.

== Distribution ==
Not much is known about the distribution of this species, as only three female specimens have been collected as of 2021. They were collected in Gyaca County, Tibet, China at an elevation of around 4435 m. (14551 ft).

== Etymology ==
The specific epithet is derived from the type locality, Gyaca County.
