= Pimoa cthulhu =

Scientific classification
- Kingdom: Animalia
- Phylum: Arthropoda
- Subphylum: Chelicerata
- Class: Arachnida
- Order: Araneae
- Infraorder: Araneomorphae
- Family: Pimoidae
- Genus: Pimoa
- Species: P. cthulhu

Binomial name
- Pimoa cthulhu Hormiga, 1994

Species of spider

Pimoa cthulhu is a species of the spider family Pimoidae. It is one of twenty-one described species in the genus Pimoa.

== Etymology ==
Pimoa is derived from the language of the Gosiute people in Utah and means "big legs". Gustavo Hormiga, who named the species, derived the specific name from H. P. Lovecraft's fictional deity Cthulhu, which Hormiga writes is "akin to the powers of Chaos".

== Distribution ==
The range of Pimoa cthulhu is restricted to areas of Mendocino and Sonoma counties in western California. Within that range the species is associated with redwood forestland habitats such as redwood stumps and logs.

== Type specimens ==
Four specimens of Pimoa cthulhu were collected and used in the 1994 type description authored by Gustavo Hormiga of the Department of Entomology at the National Museum of Natural History. Gustavo Hormiga chose a male specimen collected from the southern end of the Mendocino Woodlands State Park from a hollow redwood stump in September 1990 as holotype. One of the two female paratypes was also from a hollow redwood stump in the Mendocino Woodlands. Both specimens were collected by Darrell Ubick of the California Academy of Sciences. Two more paratypes, another male and a second female, were collected from the camp in Mendocino Woodlands in February 1979 and February 1973 respectively by S. C. Williams. The holotype and three paratypes are currently housed in the collections of the California Academy of Sciences, while the fourth paratype is in Darrell Ubick's private collection.

== Description ==
Male Pimoa cthulhu are distinguishable from related species by the unique cluster of thick spines found on the cymbial projection. Female P. cthulhu are very similar to the related species P. vera, but are distinguishable by the long sausage-like epigynum which is narrower and laterally compressed at the distal end. Males of P. cthulhu have a cephalothorax length which ranges from 4.4 to 5.7 millimetres (0.17 to 0.22 in) while females range from 4.0 to 6.1 millimetres (0.16 to 0.24 in). Both males and females are very similar in coloration, with a light to very light brown cephalothorax that is slightly darker towards the margins and an abdomen that is dark gray with four dorsal whitish spots. The males have a brown sternum, while in the females the sternum is reddish brown. While the females have legs which are dark reddish, the male legs are covered in long setae instead.
