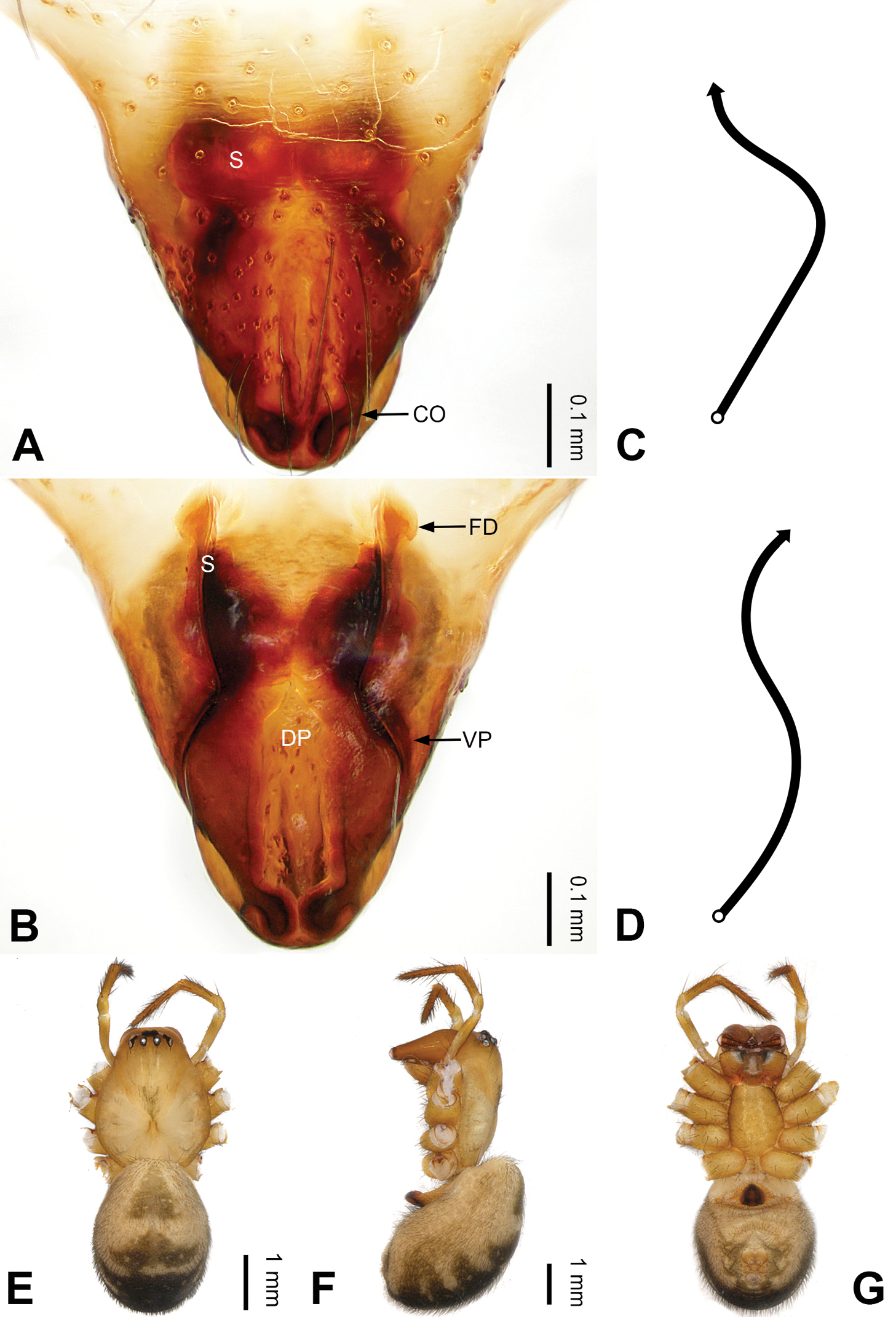

Scientific classification
- Kingdom: Animalia
- Phylum: Arthropoda
- Subphylum: Chelicerata
- Class: Arachnida
- Order: Araneae
- Infraorder: Araneomorphae
- Family: Pimoidae
- Genus: Pimoa
- Species: P. deqen

Binomial name
- Pimoa deqen Zhang & Li, 2021
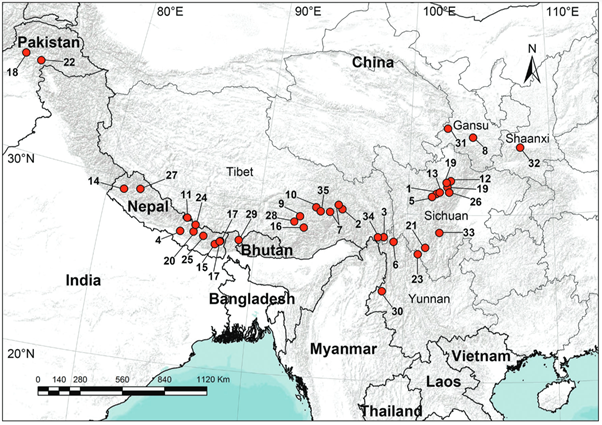
- P. deqen has the number 6

= Pimoa deqen =

Species of spider

Pimoa deqen is a species of true spider belonging to the Pimoidae family. It is found in China.

== Distribution ==
Not much is known about the distribution of this species, as only two female specimens have been collected as of 2021. They were collected in the Deqen County, Yunnan, China.

== Etymology ==
The specific epithet is derived from the type locality, the Deqen County.
