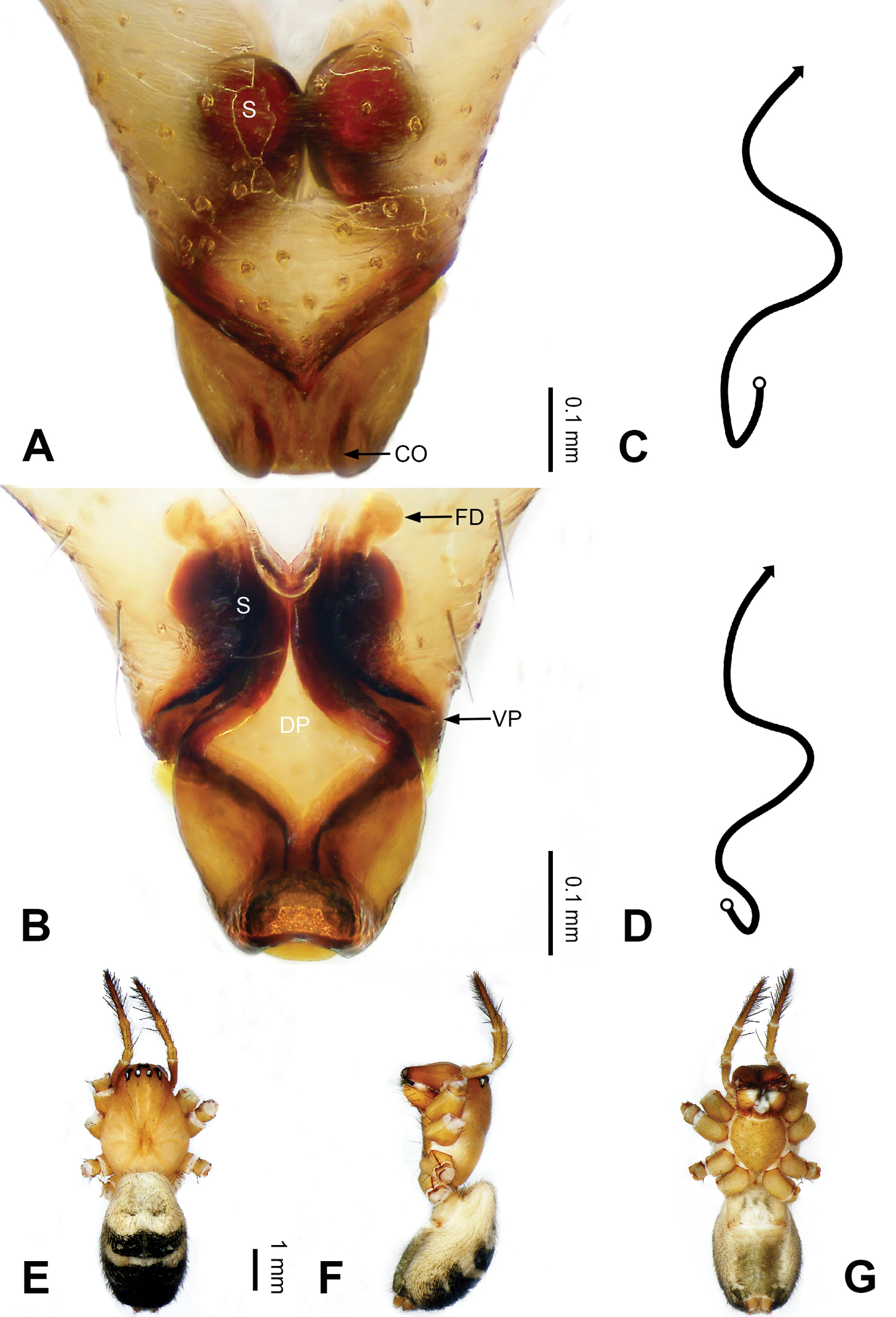

Scientific classification
- Kingdom: Animalia
- Phylum: Arthropoda
- Subphylum: Chelicerata
- Class: Arachnida
- Order: Araneae
- Infraorder: Araneomorphae
- Family: Pimoidae
- Genus: Pimoa
- Species: P. guiqing

Binomial name
- Pimoa guiqing Zhang & Li, 2021
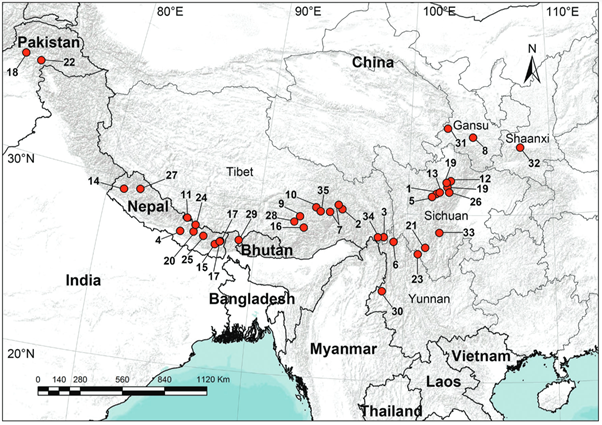
- P. guiqing has the number 8

= Pimoa guiqing =

Species of spider

Pimoa guiqing is a species of true spider in the family Pimoidae. It is found in China.

== Distribution ==
Not much is known about the distribution of this species, as only two female specimens have been collected as of 2021. They were collected on Mt. Guiqing, Wushan County, Gansu, China at an elevation of around 1922 m (6306 ft).

== Etymology ==
The specific epithet is derived from the type locality, Mt. Guiqing.
