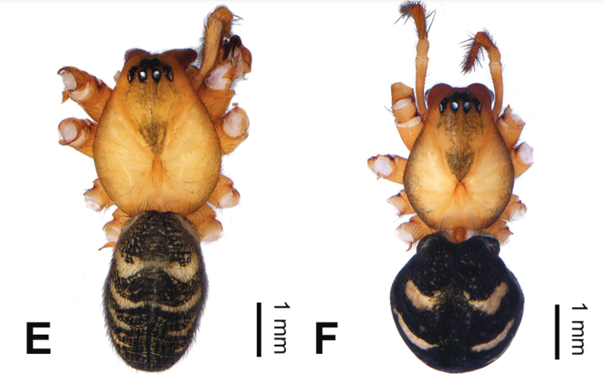
- Male (left) Female (right)

Scientific classification
- Kingdom: Animalia
- Phylum: Arthropoda
- Subphylum: Chelicerata
- Class: Arachnida
- Order: Araneae
- Infraorder: Araneomorphae
- Family: Pimoidae
- Genus: Pimoa
- Species: P. anning

Binomial name
- Pimoa anning Zhang & Li, 2021
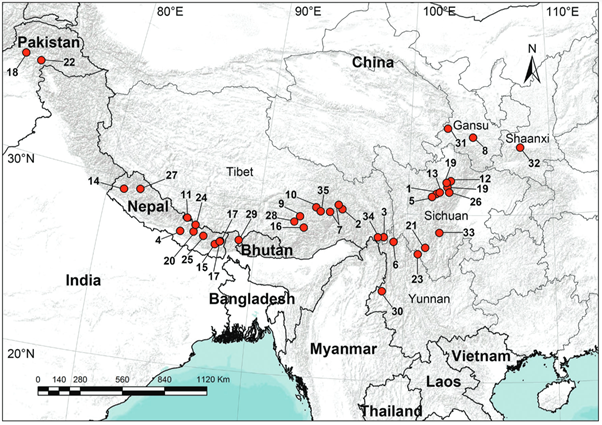
- P. anning has the number 1

= Pimoa anning =

Species of spider

Pimoa anning is a species of true spider in the family Pimoidae. It is found in China.

== Distribution ==
As of 2021, the species has only been found on the type locality, on Mt. Gada at an elevation of around 3048 m (9967 ft.). Four specimens were collected from this locality.

== Etymology ==
The specific epithet is derived from the type locality, Anning Township in Jinchuan County.
