= Goshute =

Tribe of Western Shoshone Native Americans

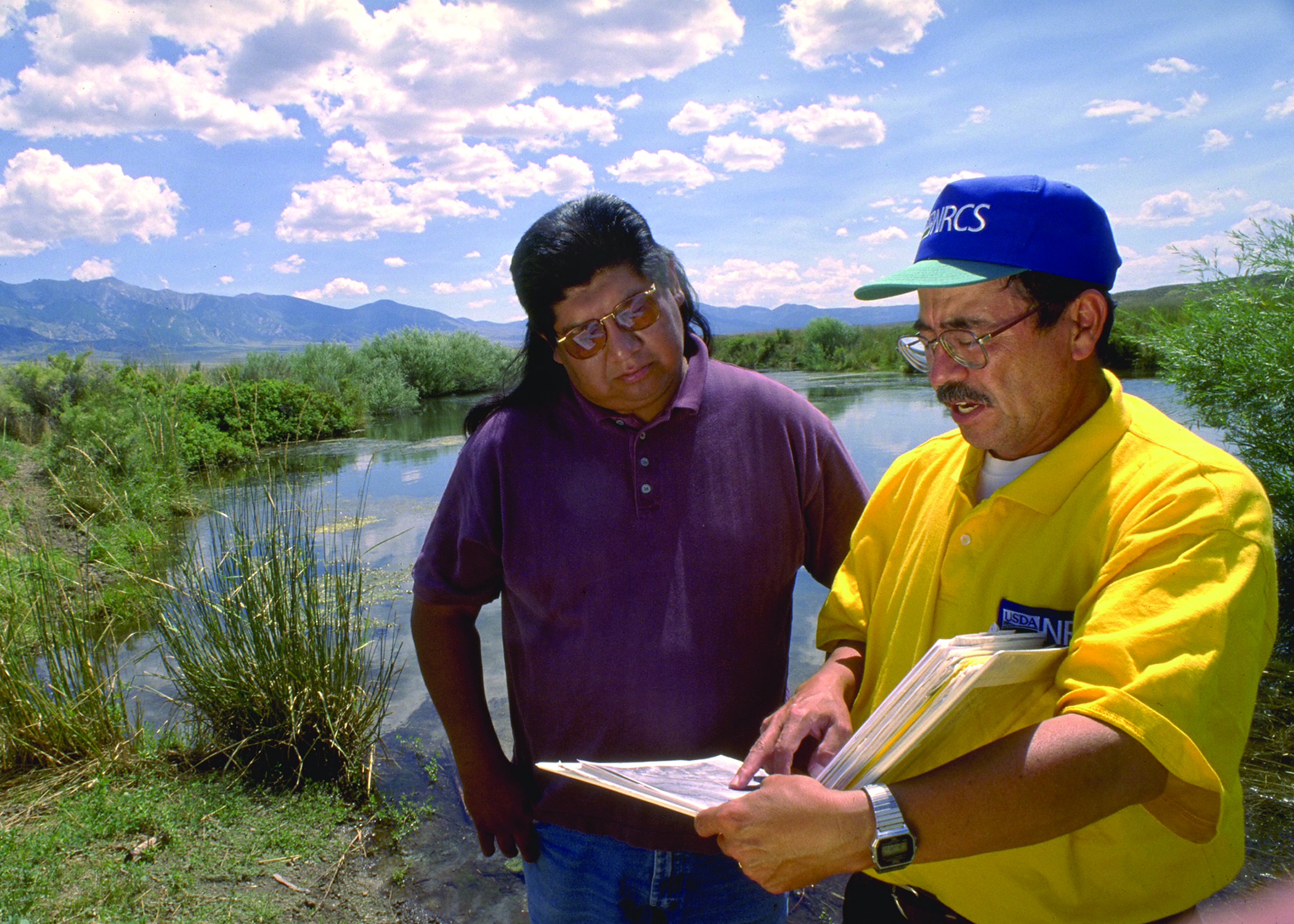
- Milton Hooper (left), Environmental Specialist at the Goshute Indian Reservation, reviews plans for the reservation

Total population
- 673

Regions with significant populations
- United States (Nevada and Utah)

Languages
- Gosiute dialect, English

Religion
- Native American Church, Mormonism

Related ethnic groups
- other Western Shoshone peoples

The Goshutes are a tribe of Western Shoshone Native Americans. There are two federally recognized Goshute tribes today:

- Confederated Tribes of the Goshute Reservation, located in Nevada and Utah
- Skull Valley Band of Goshute Indians of Utah of the Skull Valley Indian Reservation, located in Utah

== Culture ==
The Goshute (Gosiute) refer to themselves as the Newe [nɨwɨ] or Newenee [nɨwɨnɨɨ] ('Person' or 'People'), though at times have used the term Kutsipiuti (Gutsipiuti) or Kuttuhsippeh, meaning "People of the dry earth" or "People of the Desert" (literally: "dust, dry ashes People"). Neighboring Numic-speaking peoples used variants including Kusiutta / Kusiyuttah, Kusiyuttah, Newenee, Gusiyuta, or Kusiyutah when referring to the Goshute People.

English variants included: Goshutes, Go-sha-utes, Goship-Utes, Goshoots, Gos-ta-Utes, Gishiss, Goshen Utes, Kucyut, and Gosiutsi. These names suggest a closer affinity among the Goshute and Ute Peoples than other Numic-speaking groups, such as the Shoshone and Paiute. However, Ute, Uin-tah or Utah Indian were often used as catch-all terms by Anglo-American settlers.

The Goshute occupied much of what is now the western Utah and eastern Nevada. In aboriginal times, they practiced subsistence hunting and gathering and exhibited a fairly simple social structure. Organized primarily in nuclear families, the Goshutes hunted and gathered in family groups and often cooperated with other family groups that usually made up a village. Most Goshutes gathered with other families only two or three times a year, typically for pine nut harvests, communal hunts for no more than two to six weeks, and winter lodging which was for a longer period. These gatherings often lasted no more than two to six weeks, although winter gatherings were longer, with families organizing under a dagwani, or village headman.

The Goshutes hunted lizards, snakes, small fish, birds, gophers, rabbits, rats, skunks, squirrels, and, when available, pronghorn, bear, coyote, deer, elk, and bighorn sheep. Hunting of large game was usually done by men, the hunters sharing the large game with other members of the village. Women and children gathered harvesting nearly 100 species of wild vegetables and seeds, the most important being the pine nut. They also gathered insects the most important being red ants, crickets and grasshoppers. For meeting most of its needs, a family was self-sufficient. Their traditional arts include beadwork and basketry.

Prior to contact with the Mormons, the Goshutes wintered in the Deep Creek Valley in dug out houses built of willow poles and earth known as wiki-ups. In the spring and summer they gathered wild onions, carrots and potatoes, and hunted small game in the mountains.

=== Ethnobotany ===
The Goshute use the root of Carex as medicine.

== Language ==
Gosiute is one main regional dialect of Shoshoni, a Central Numic language.

== History ==
The Goshute are an indigenous peoples of the Great Basin, and their traditional territory extends from the Great Salt Lake (Goshute: Tĭ'tsa-pa - "Fish Water" or Pi'a-pa - "Great Water") to the Steptoe Range in Nevada, and south to Simpson Springs (Goshute term: Pi'a-pa or Toi'ba). Within this area, the Goshutes were concentrated in three areas: Deep Creek Valley near Ibapah (Ai-bim-pa / Ai'bĭm-pa - "White Clay Water" referring to Deep Creek) on the Utah-Nevada border, Simpson's Springs farther southeast, and the Skull (Goshute: Pa'ho-no-pi / Pa'o-no-pi) and Tooele Valleys.

In the 18th and 19th centuries, Navajo and Ute slave raiders preyed upon the Goshute. Unlike their neighbors, the Goshutes only obtained horses in the late 19th century. The Goshute diet depended on the grasslands, and consisted mostly of rats, lizards, snakes, rabbits, insects, grass-seed, and roots.

The first written description of the Goshute was made in the journal of Jedediah Smith while returning from a trip to California on his way to Bear Lake (Goshute: Pa'ga-di-da-ma / Pa'ga-dĭt) in 1827. For the next two decades European contact with the Goshutes remained sporadic and insignificant.

There were five divisions or subtribes:

- Pagayuats, formerly on Otter Creek (Goshute term for otter: Pan'tsuk / Pan'tsuk)., s. w. Utah
- Pierruiats (perhaps after the Goshute term for the Deep Creek Range), living at Deep Creek, s. w. Utah, in 1873
- Torountogoats, formerly in Egan Canyon and Egan Range, e. Nevada
- Tuwurints, formerly living on Snake Creek, s. w., Utah
- Unkagarits, formerly in Skull Valley, s. w. Utah

Other sources are listing following Kusiutta / Goshute (Gosiute) divisions or regional groupings:

- Cedar Valley Goshute (inhabited the Sevier Desert northwest of Sevier River, identical with the above-mentioned "Pagayuats band".)
- Deep Creek Valley Goshute or Aipimpaa Newe ("Deep Creek Valley People", lived in Deep Creek Valley and Deep Creek Range (Goshute: Pi’a-roi-ya-bi), identical with the above-mentioned "Pierruiats band")
- Rush Valley Goshute (lived in Rush Valley)
- Skull Valley Goshute or Wepayuttax ("Skull Valley People", lived in Skull Valley (Goshute: Pa'ho-no-pi / Pa'o-no-pi), identical with the "Unkagarits band", easternmost of the Goshute bands, and nearest to the [sometimes with them associated] "Wipayutta" or "Weber Utes", a mixed band of Northwestern Shoshone and Cumumba Band of Utes)
- Tooele Valley Goshute (lived in the vicinity of today's Tooele (Goshute: Si'o-gwût / Si'o-gwa) and the valley of the same name)
- Trout Creek Goshute (lived in along Trout Creek (Goshute: O'mo-ti-o-gai-pi) in the northern part of Snake Valley; identical with the "Tuwurints band".)

The Western Shoshoni speaking Ely Shoshone Tribe of Nevada called all Goshute after one of their important bands Aibibaa Newe ("White chalky clay Water People"), the Duckwater Shoshone Tribe (Tsaidüka) know them as Egwibaanɨwɨ (literally "Smell Water People") - maybe referring to their desert culture survival techniques.

=== Conflict with Mormons ===
In 1847, pioneers with the Church of Jesus Christ of Latter-day Saints (LDS Church) settled in the neighboring Salt Lake Valley, and shortly afterwards began to impinge Goshute territory. Tooele valley soon became a major grazing ground for LDS cattle owners from Salt Lake to the north and Utah Valley to the south. In 1849, the pioneers started building permanent structures in Goshute territory, beginning with a grist mill commissioned by Ezra T. Benson. Other pioneer families followed and by 1850 Tooele County was established. The Mormon encroachment severely interrupted the Goshute way of life. Mormons occupied many of the best camping sites near reliable springs, hunted in Goshute hunting grounds, and overgrazed the meadowland, leaving it unfit for sustaining the animals and plants used by the Goshutes. Pioneers believed that Utah was a promised land given to them by God, and did not recognize any Goshute claim to the land.

The Goshutes did not accept the Mormon claim of exclusive rights to natural resources. They began confiscating cattle that would trespass onto their property. At first the cattle were herded to Utah Valley, suggesting cooperation with the Timpanogos. After the Timpanogos suffered the massacres at Battle Creek and Fort Utah, many of the survivors came and combined with the Goshutes, intermarrying and assuming leadership roles. By 1851, the Goshutes had confiscated approximately $5,000 worth of cattle that had been grazing in their traditional homelands. In response, the Mormons sent an army with orders to kill the Goshute. The army ambushed a Goshute village, but the Goshute were able to defend themselves without any casualties. Later that year, a group of Goshute again confiscated cattle this time belonging to Charles White. An army of fifty Mormons attacked the Goshute camp and killed nine Goshutes.

In April 1851, a group of Goshute confiscated some horses that had invaded their territory near Benson Grist Mill. General Daniel H. Wells sent a posse led by Orrin Porter Rockwell to pursue the Goshute. They lost the trail of the Goshute that had taken the horses and encountered another group of 20 or 30 people, whom they took prisoner but did not disarm. When some of the captured Goshute tried to escape, one was shot by Custer, a non-Mormon member of the posse. Custer was then shot by one of the Native Americans, who was in turn shot by another posse member. All but four or five prisoners escaped, those that didn't escape were executed by Rockwell. The Mormons continued to push further into Goshute territory, and by 1860, there were 1008 non-Natives in the traditional Goshute homelands of Tooele, Rush, and Skull Valleys. With the settlement of Ibapah, the Mormons had completely pushed the Goshutes out of any favored land.

=== Goshute War ===
Soon 49ers and later wagon trains of emigrant groups continually passed through their territory on the way west to California. Contact increased when the military established Camp Floyd at Fairfield, later the Pony Express and Butterfield Overland Mail set up stations along the Central Overland Route between Fairfield, Simpson Springs, Fish Springs, and Deep Creek. Soon after telegraph lines were strung along that route. Ranchers and farmers moved into the region, like the stations, taking the best lands available with water and forage, significant water and resource sites for the Goshutes in the otherwise barren land.

Finally after attacks on the Central Overland stage stations and coaches in the early 1860s, California Volunteers of the Union Army, under Brigadier-General Patrick E. Connor, attacked the Goshutes, killing many and forcing the survivors to sign a treaty. The treaty did not give up land or sovereignty but did agree to end all hostile actions against the whites and to allow several routes of travel to pass through their country. They also agreed to the construction of military posts and station houses wherever necessary. Stage lines, telegraph lines, and railways would be permitted to be built through their domain; mines, mills, and ranches would be permitted and timber could be cut. The federal government agreed to pay the Goshutes $1,000.00 a year for twenty years as compensation for the destruction of their game. The treaty was signed on October 12, 1863, ratified in 1864 and announced by President Lincoln on January 17, 1865.

The tribe ratified their constitution in 1940. In 1993, they had 413 enrolled members.

== Skull Valley Band of Goshute Indians of Utah ==
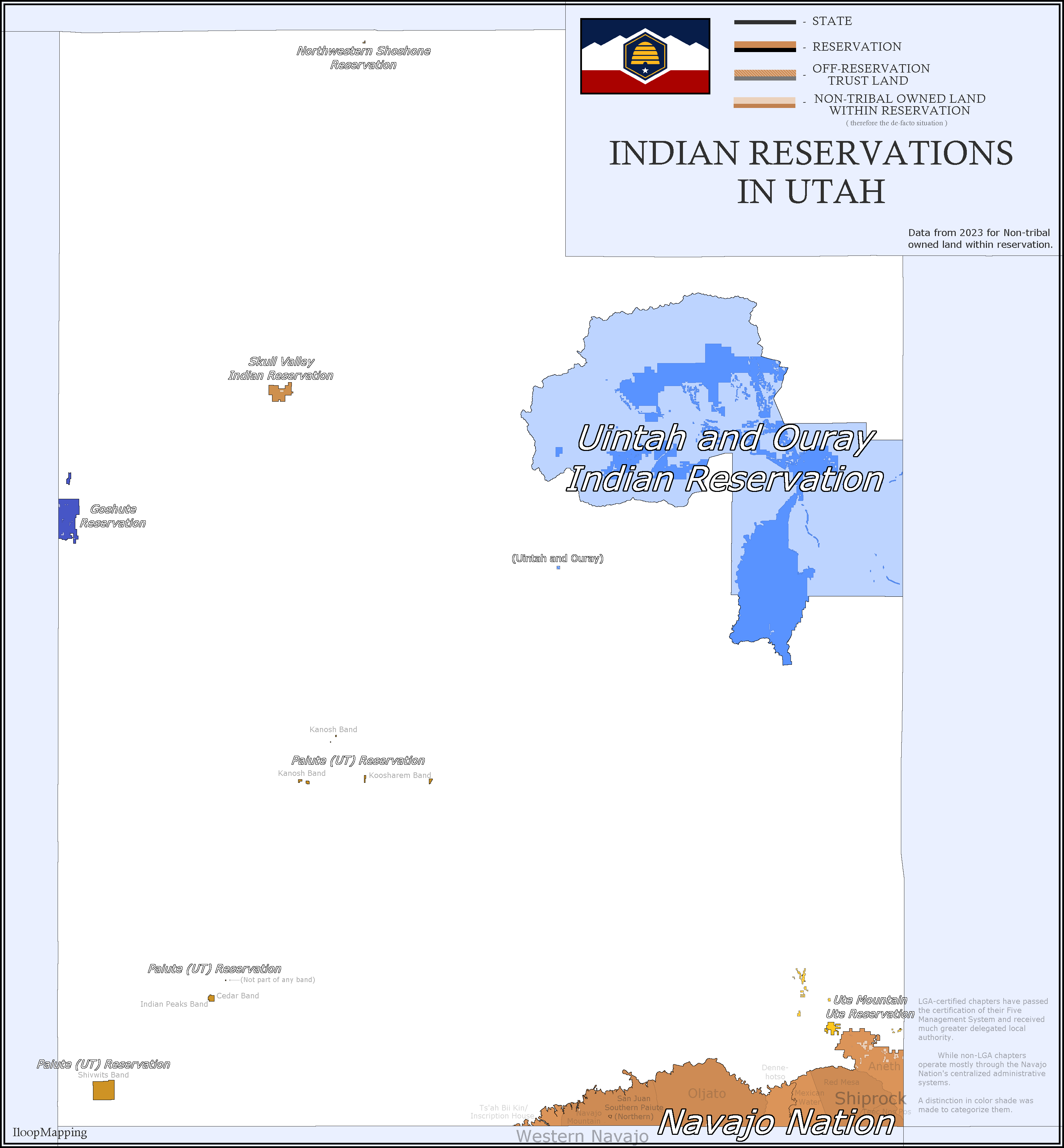
Map of the Skull Valley Reservation and neighboring reservations (In orange).

The Skull Valley Indian Reservation is located in Tooele County, Utah, about halfway between the Goshute Reservation and Salt Lake City, Utah. The tribe consists of about 130 people, of whom 31 live on an 18,000-acre (7,300 ha) reservation located at 40°23′15″N 112°44′09″W in Tooele County. The Dugway Proving Grounds lies just south of Skull Valley. To the east is a nerve gas storage facility and to the north is the Magnesium Corporation plant which has had severe environmental problems. The reservation was a proposed location for an 820-acre (330 ha) dry cask storage facility for the storage of 40,000 metric tons of spent nuclear fuel. Only 120 acres (49 ha) are for the actual facility, and the rest of the land is a buffer area. 8½ years after application, this facility was licensed by the NRC.

The office of the Skull Valley Band of Goshute is located at 407 Skull Valley Road, Skull Valley, Utah. Tribal membership at the end of 2020 is 148.
