= Pimoa rupicola =

Scientific classification
- Kingdom: Animalia
- Phylum: Arthropoda
- Subphylum: Chelicerata
- Class: Arachnida
- Order: Araneae
- Infraorder: Araneomorphae
- Family: Pimoidae
- Genus: Pimoa
- Species: P. rupicola

Binomial name
- Pimoa rupicola (Simon, 1884)

Species of spider

Pimoa rupicola is a species of the spiders family Pimoidae found in France and Italy. First described in 1884, it is one of twenty-eight described species in the genus Pimoa.

== Ecology ==
Pimoa rupicola is a troglophile species, abundant in subterranean habitats and occasionally recorded from surface habitats such as leaf litter, humid rocks covered by mosses and mountain screes. The species occurs preferentially in areas characterized by a Mediterranean climate.

== Morphology ==
The male palp is characterized by a semicircular embolic area. The cymbium is flat, circular, and shows unusual modifications on its retro-lateral margin. The embolus has 3 processes; the paracymbium has no discrete sclerite.
