= Tippett Canyon =

Valley in Nevada

Tippett Canyon, is a valley whose creek drains the northwest watershed of the South Mountains in White Pine County, Nevada. Its mouth is at an elevation of 6,450 feet (1,970 meters). Its source is at the head of the canyon near Cedar Pass, at an elevation of 6,649 feet (2,027 meters) at 39°46′04″N 114°10′02″W.
