= Deep Creek Railroad =

Railroad Company

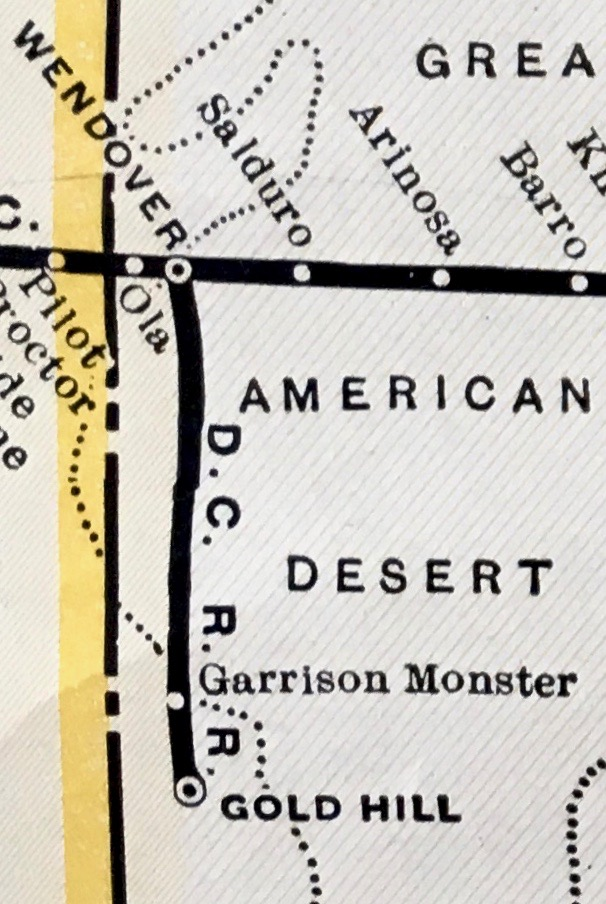
Route 1931

The Deep Creek Railroad is a defunct railroad company that constructed and operated a line between Wendover and Gold Hill, Utah, a distance of about 45 miles (72 km). It was constructed in 1917 to serve a mining district in the Gold Hill vicinity and existed for 22 years before succumbing to perennially weak traffic levels.

== History ==
Beginning in the late 1800s, prospectors began exploring the remote Deep Creek Mountains of far west-central Utah, and a brief gold-mining boom resulted in the establishment of the small town of Gold Hill in 1892. The town's initial period of prosperity was relatively short-lived, but the promise of a second boom surfaced in the 1910s with the development of copper-mining properties in the Gold Hill area. The rapid growth in the use of electricity during the period created a strong demand for copper, and nearby mining districts near Ely, Nevada and Bingham Canyon, Utah were highly successful copper producers; Gold Hill's promoters hoped that its mines would fall into the same league.

The need for a reliable and inexpensive method of shipping ore from these mines was the impetus for construction of the Deep Creek Railroad. Supported by a group of investors that included Utah Senator Reed Smoot and the president of the Western Pacific Railroad, planning for the new railway began in 1916, and it was constructed the following year. The new line began at the small town of Wendover, on the Utah/Nevada border, where a connection was made with the Western Pacific. From Wendover, the railroad headed straight south through the salt desert, the right-of-way only 30 feet (9.1 m) east of the Nevada state line. The tangent was broken only by the need to bypass a small hill, causing the railroad to dip into Nevada for approximately one-half mile (0.80 km). From there, the railroad angled southeast, following the edge of the desert into the Gold Hill area. The railroad's main line terminated in Gold Hill, although a short branch accessed the mines just to the east.

The Deep Creek Railroad was rapidly and inexpensively built, with minimal earthworks and a small roster of used equipment. The railroad owned only two steam locomotives, both of which came second-hand from the Denver and Rio Grande Western Railroad. A single passenger car and one boxcar completed the roster. Ore from the mines was carried in freight cars belonging to connecting railroads. By 1918, the railroad had become a subsidiary of the Western Pacific, which financially supported the line due to the connecting freight traffic it generated.

Unfortunately for the new railroad, the mines in the Gold Hill area enjoyed only a short productive life. Usable copper deposits began to diminish by 1920, and although the railroad also carried tungsten and arsenic produced near Gold Hill, mineral production in the area began declining rapidly about 1925. This cost the railroad nearly its entire traffic base, and eventually train service was reduced to a single weekly round trip, operating each Friday. Eventually the lack of traffic and prospects inevitably doomed the railroad, and it was finally abandoned after July 31, 1939. Most of the railroad's former grade remains visible today.
