= Dutch Mountain (Utah) =

Mountain in Utah, United States

Coordinates: 40°13′30″N 113°50′36″W

Dutch Mountain is a mountain summit in Tooele County, Utah. It reaches an elevation of 7,693 feet (2,345 meters). Dutch Mountain summit is the northeasternmost of the summits found on the ridge of Dutch Mountain from Woodman Peak, at 7,260 feet, lowest of these summits, on the extreme southwest of the ridge. Dutch Mountain summit lies 4 miles north of Gold Hill, Utah.
