= James H. Simpson =

American army officer and surveyor

James Hervey Simpson
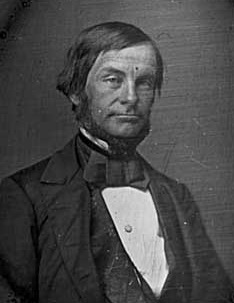
- Simpson in 1857
- Born: March 9, 1813; New Brunswick, New Jersey, U.S.
- Died: March 2, 1883 (aged 69); Saint Paul, Minnesota, U.S.
- Burial place: Oakland Cemetery in Saint Paul, Minnesota
- Military career
- Allegiance: United States of America; Union
- Branch: United States Army; Union Army
- Service years: 1832–1880
- Rank: Colonel; Brevet Brigadier General
- Conflicts: Second Seminole War; Battles of the Loxahatchee; American Civil War; Peninsula campaign; Battle of Eltham's Landing; Battle of Gaines' Mill

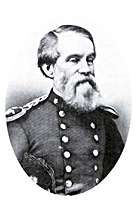
Simpson in c. 1878

James Hervey Simpson (March 9, 1813 – March 2, 1883) was an officer in the U.S. Army and a member of the United States Corps of Topographical Engineers.

== Early years ==
He was born in New Brunswick, New Jersey on March 9, 1813, the son of John Simpson and Mary Brunson. He graduated from the United States Military Academy in 1832 and was initially assigned to the 3rd U.S. Artillery. He served in the Second Seminole War and was promoted to first lieutenant in 1837.

== Topographical Engineers ==
In 1838, a separate department known as the U.S. Army's Topographical Engineers was created (not to be confused with the Corps of Engineers with whom they were merged during the Civil War). Simpson was one of the officers transferred to the newly created bureau and assigned as an assistant to Cpt. W. G. Williams who was in charge of harbor construction on Lake Erie. The following year, he worked on road construction in Florida and then lake surveys in Wisconsin and Ohio. From 1845 to 1847, he was in charge of the harbor of Erie.

== New Mexico Expedition, 1849 ==
In 1849, Lieutenant Simpson made his first journey into the American west, during an expedition commanded by Colonel John James Abert. Simpson surveyed a road from Fort Smith, Arkansas to Santa Fe, New Mexico. This was followed by a punitive raid against the Navajo, under the command of John M. Washington. Simpson included sketches and artwork from the brothers Edward Kern and Richard Kern. Simpson then assumed responsibility as the Chief Topographical Engineer for the Ninth Military Department, based in Santa Fe.

== Other Duties ==
In the spring of 1851, Simpson the Territory of Minnesota surveying and improving roads. In 1853, he was promoted to captain. In May 1853 he was transferred to Florida, where he supervised survey work associated with the United States Coast Survey.

== Utah Expedition, 1858–59 ==
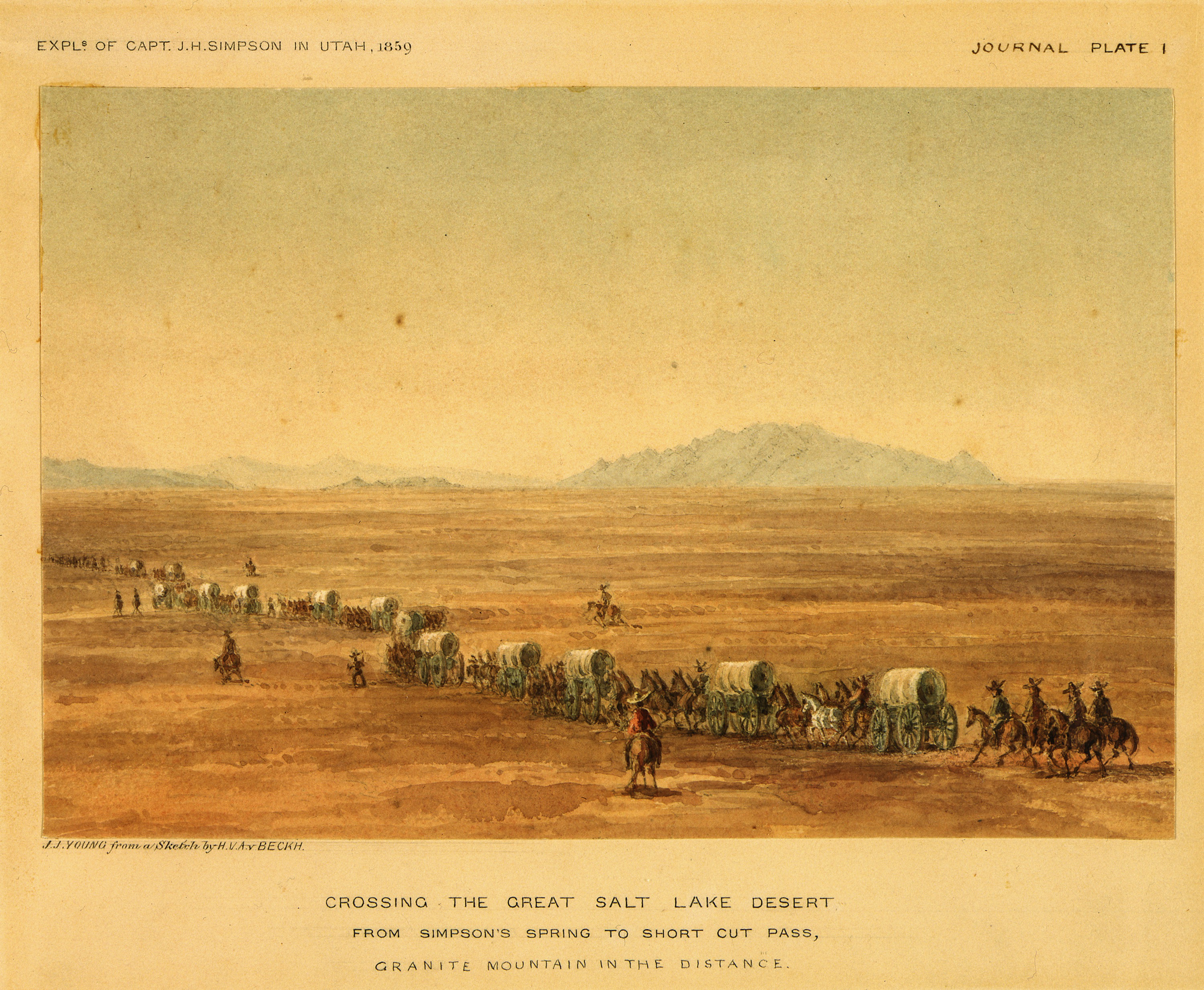
Crossing the Great Salt Lake Desert, 1859

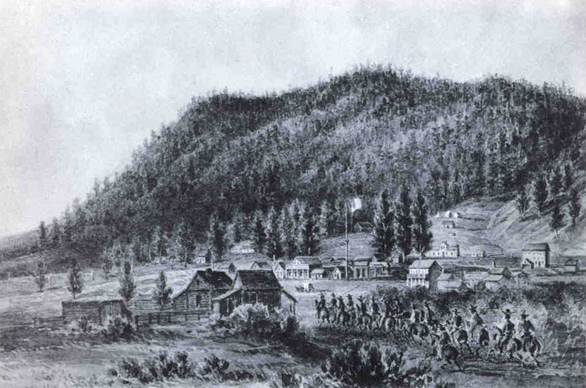
Captain Simpson's Utah Expedition arrived at the Mormon settlement of Genoa near Lake Tahoe in 1859

During the winter of 1857–1858, Simpson was ordered to support the military forces assembled for the Utah War. Simpson's duties included preparing maps for the upcoming campaign, while based at Fort Leavenworth and Fort Kearney. On 3 July 1858, Simpson departed for Camp Floyd, arriving on 19 August. Simpson was ordered to survey a wagon road between Camp Floyd and Fort Bridger. Once completed, Simpson was order to make a preliminary reconnaissance into the Great Salt Lake Desert, which he commenced on 19 October. On 2 May 1859, Simpson led a more extensive expedition consisting of 64 men.

His photographer, Samuel C. Mills, produced the earliest surviving photographs of features along the trail. Simpson's Central Route played a vital role in the transportation of mail, freight, and passengers between the established eastern states and California, especially when hostilities of the Civil War closed the Butterfield Overland Mail stagecoach route that ran along the southern border states. George Chorpenning immediately switched to Simpson's route to run his existing mail and stage line, and the Pony Express used it as well. In 1861 the Transcontinental Telegraph was laid along the route, making the Pony Express obsolete. Afterwards, Wells Fargo & Co. hauled mail, freight, and passengers along Simpson's route until 1869, when transportation and telegraphy were switched to the newly completed Transcontinental Railroad.

== Civil War ==
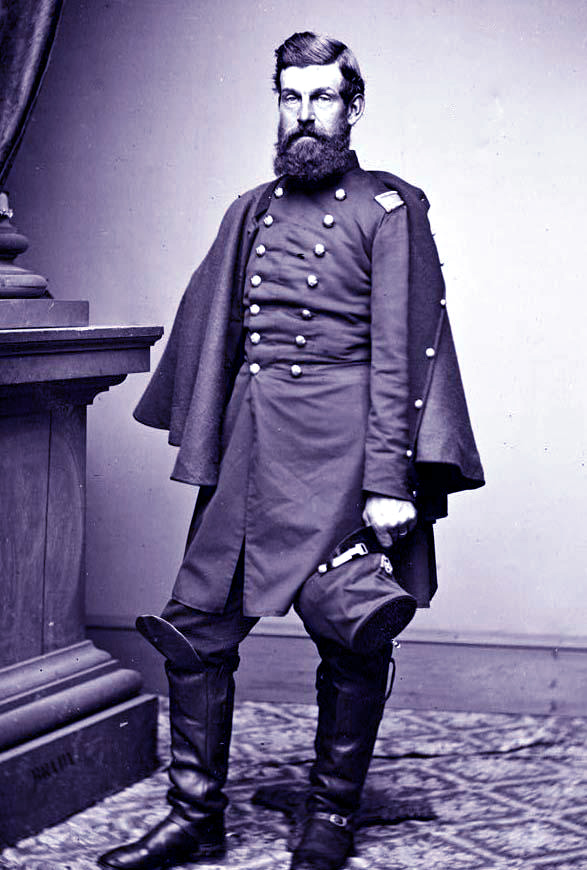
James H. Simpson during the Civil War

During the American Civil War, Simpson served as colonel of the 4th New Jersey Volunteer Infantry and was captured at the Battle of Gaines's Mill. He was paroled and returned, but resigned his commission of volunteers on August 24, 1862, to return to his rank of major in the Corps of Topographical Engineers. He was attached to the Department of the Ohio and was in charge of the expansion and improvements of the defenses for Cincinnati, Ohio. For his services during the war, Simpson was brevetted to the rank of brigadier general.

== Later career ==
Simpson was named chief engineer of the Interior Department. He oversaw the construction of the Transcontinental Railroad, the completion of which made his Central Nevada Route obsolete. In 1880 he retired to St. Paul, Minnesota, and died there on March 2, 1883.

The Simpson Park Mountains in central Nevada, a small range in west-central Utah (Simpson Mountains), and Simpson Springs Pony Express Station are all named after him.

== Bibliography ==
- Navajo Expedition: Journal of a Military Reconnaissance from Santa Fe, New Mexico to the Navajo Country, Made in 1849 (1852)
- The Shortest Route to California: Illustrated by a History of Explorations of the Great Basin of Utah with its Topographical and Geological Character and Some Account of the Indian Tribes (1869)
- Essay on Coronado's March in Search of the Seven Cities of Cibola (1871)
- Report of Explorations across the Great Basin in 1859 (1876)
