= Tank Wash (Tooele County, Utah) =

Tank Wash is a wash in Tooele County, Utah.

Tank Wash has its source at 40°11′59″N 113°52′44″W, at an elevation at 6,210 feet (1,890 meters) on the west southwest slope of 7,260-foot Woodman Peak. Its mouth lies at an elevation at 4,229 feet (1,289 meters) in the mud flat in the southwestern portion of the Great Salt Lake Desert south of Wendover Airport.
