= White Sage Flat (Nevada/Utah) =

Flat in Nevada and Utah, USA

White Sage Flat is a flat in Elko County, Nevada and Tooele County, Utah.

White Sage Flat lies mainly in Tooele County at an elevation near its center of 5,167 feet (1,575 meters). It extends westward into Elko County, Nevada at 40°09′00″N 113°59′33″W It lies east of the Antelope Valley badlands, and it lies just south and southeast of Ferber Peak.
