= Eightmile, Nevada =

- Ghost town
- Location within Nevada Location within the United States
- Coordinates: 39°58′16″N 114°04′33″W
- Country: United States
- State: Nevada
- County: White Pine
- Elevation: 5,541 ft (1,689 m)

Eightmile is a locale on the Goshute Indian Reservation in White Pine County, Nevada. It is located along Spring Creek.

== History ==
Eightmile was originally the location of Eight Mile Station, a station on the route of the Pony Express. It was later a stagecoach station along the Central Overland Route across the territory and then the state of Nevada.

On March 23, 1863, the Goshutes, led by White Horse, burned the station and killed the keeper, which started the Overland or Goshute War.

During the American Civil War and during the Snake War, this station was also frequently occupied by Union Army troops and later U. S. Army regulars from Fort Ruby, it was one of several outposts used to defend and keep open this transportation route that linked the western states and territories to the eastern part of the country before the completion of the construction of the transcontinental railroad in 1869.

A sheep ranch was established in the 1900s.

The Lincoln Highway passed through Eightmile on its route from Ibapah, Utah to Ely, Nevada.

In 1938, the land was bought by the U.S. Government for the use of the Goshutes.

The site of the Georgetta Ranch, also referred to as Eightmile, is located nearby.

== Today ==
The site of Eightmile now appears to be the location of a private residence.

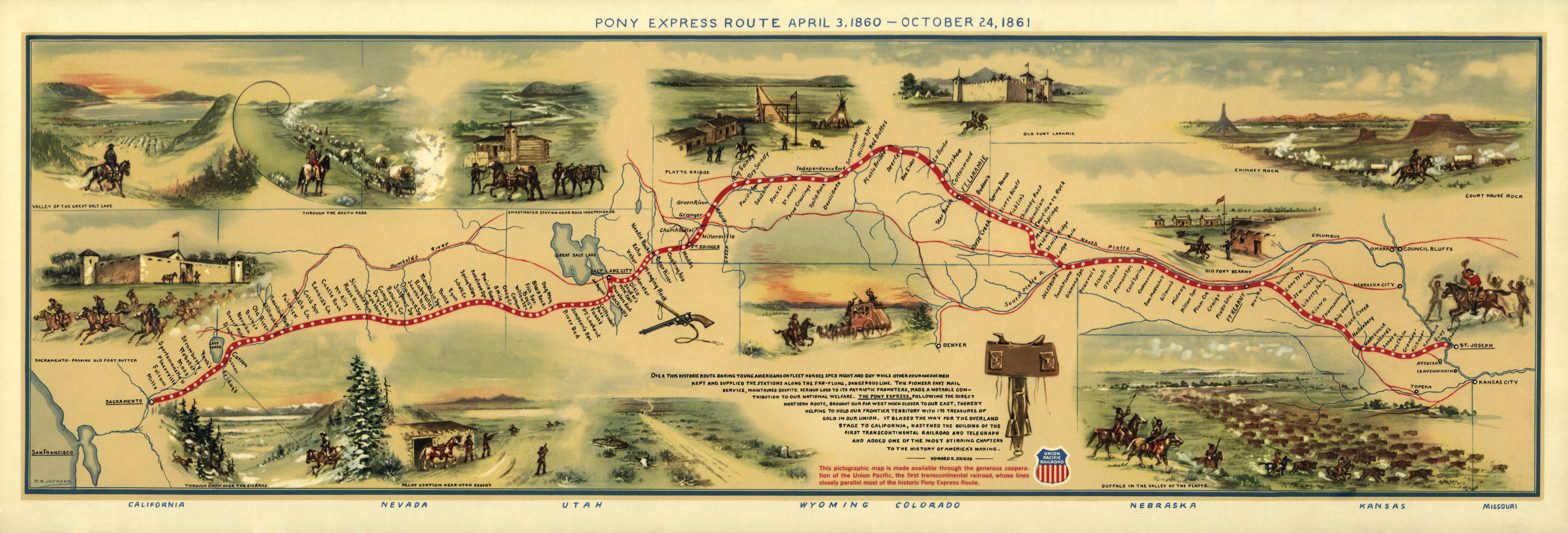
Illustrated Map of Pony Express Route in 1860 by William Henry Jackson~ Courtesy the Library of Congress ~The Pony Express mail route, April 3, 1860 – October 24, 1861; Reproduction of Jackson illustration issued to commemorate the 100th anniversary of Pony Express founding on April 3, 1960. Reproduction of Jackson's map issued by the Union Pacific Railroad Company.
