= Nanoa =

Scientific classification
- Domain: Eukaryota
- Kingdom: Animalia
- Phylum: Arthropoda
- Subphylum: Chelicerata
- Class: Arachnida
- Order: Araneae
- Infraorder: Araneomorphae
- Family: Pimoidae
- Genus: Nanoa; Hormiga, Buckle & Scharff, 2005
- Species: N. enana

Binomial name
- Nanoa enana Hormiga, Buckle & Scharff, 2005

Genus of spiders

Nanoa is a sister genus of Pimoa, in the spider family Pimoidae, containing the single species Nanoa enana.

== Etymology ==
Combined from Greek nanos "dwarf" and the ending -oa, which follows the other pimoid genera Pimoa and Weintrauboa. The name enana of the only species means "dwarf" in Spanish.

== Description ==
N. enana is the smallest known pimoid species, with a total body length of only 1.5 mm.

== Distribution ==
N. enana occurs in northern California and southern Oregon.
