= South Mountains (Nevada/Utah) =

Mountain range in Nevada and Utah, US

South Mountains are a range of mountains primarily in White Pine County, Nevada, and partially to the east in Juab County, Utah. The range is sometimes referred to as the Deep Creek Mountains, or the Ibenpah Mountains. The South Mountains are divided from the Kern Mountains to the south by Tippett Canyon on the west and Pleasant Valley to the east. They are divided from the Deep Creek Range to the east in Utah by Johnson Canyon, on the north, and by Water Canyon on the south. The range is bounded on the north by Spring Creek Flat and on the west by Antelope Valley.

The highest elevation of the range is an unnamed peak with an elevation of 9,724 feet (2,964 meters) at 39°45′16″N 114°03′10″W in Nevada.
