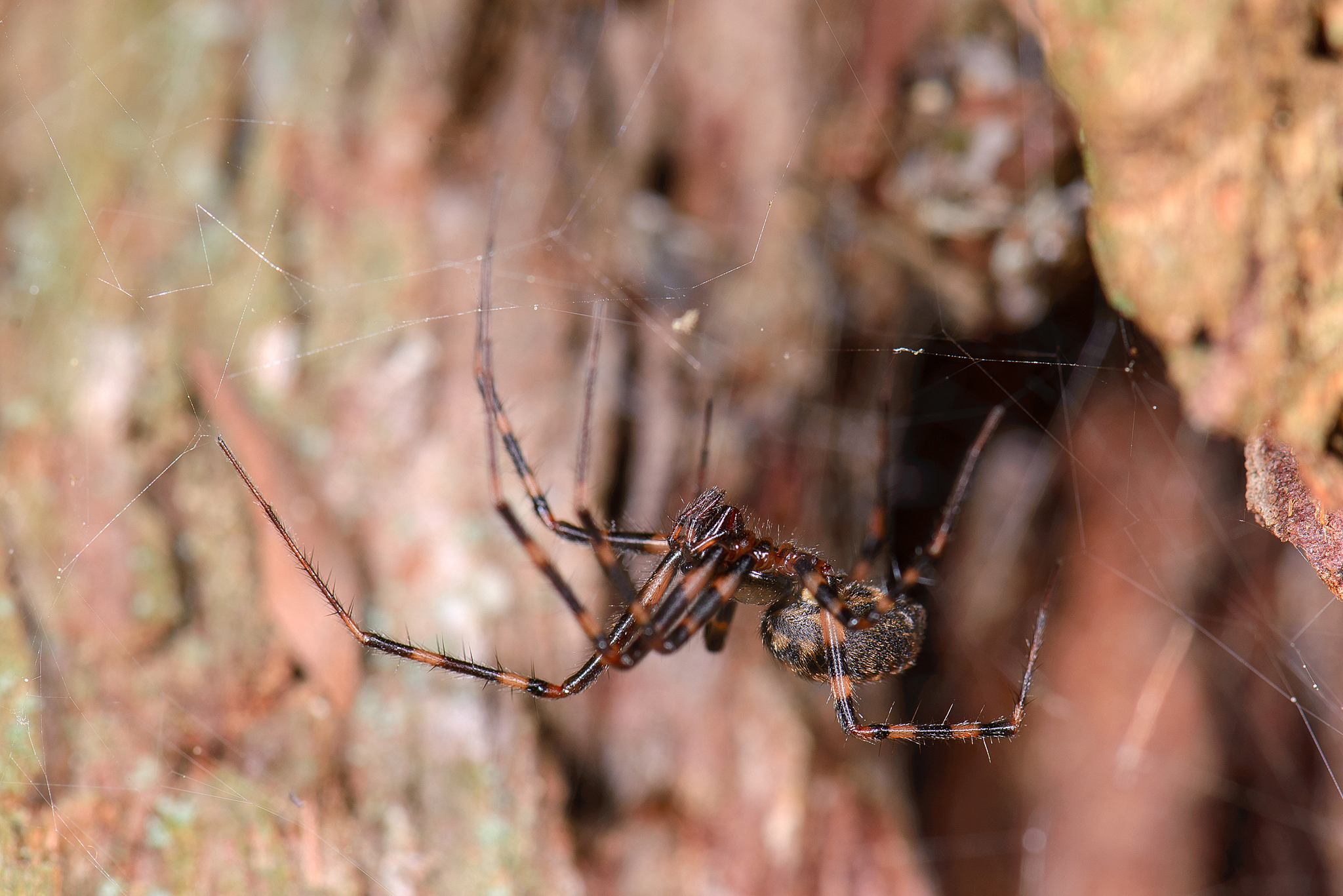
- Pimoa laurae

Scientific classification
- Kingdom: Animalia
- Phylum: Arthropoda
- Subphylum: Chelicerata
- Class: Arachnida
- Order: Araneae
- Infraorder: Araneomorphae
- Family: Pimoidae
- Genus: Pimoa; Chamberlin & Ivie, 1943

Type species
- Labulla hespera Gertsch & Ivie, 1936

Species
- 86, see text

= Pimoa =

Pimoa Temporal range: Palaeogene–present

Genus of spiders

Pimoa is a genus of spiders in the family Pimoidae. Its sister genus is the monotypic Nanoa.

== Etymology ==
Pimoa is derived from the language of the Gosiute people in Utah with the meaning "big legs". The other genera in the family match its ending ("-oa").

== Distribution ==
See the description under Pimoidae.

== Species ==
As of January 2026, this genus includes 86 species:

- Pimoa altioculata (Keyserling, 1886) – Alaska, Canada, United States
- Pimoa anatolica Hormiga, 1994 – China
- Pimoa anning Zhang & Li, 2021 – China
- Pimoa binchuanensis Zhang & Li, 2019 – China
- Pimoa bomi Zhang & Li, 2021 – China
- Pimoa breuili (Fage, 1931) – Spain
- Pimoa breviata Chamberlin & Ivie, 1943 – United States
- Pimoa cawarong Zhang & Li, 2021 – China
- Pimoa clavata Xu & Li, 2007 – China
- Pimoa cona Zhang & Li, 2020 – China
- Pimoa crispa (Fage, 1946) – India
- Pimoa cthulhu Hormiga, 1994 – United States
- Pimoa curvata Chamberlin & Ivie, 1943 – Canada, United States
- Pimoa daman Zhang & Li, 2021 – Nepal
- Pimoa danba Zhang & Li, 2021 – China
- Pimoa delphinica Mammola, Hormiga & Isaia, 2016 – Italy
- Pimoa deqen Zhang & Li, 2021 – China
- Pimoa dongjiu Zhang & Li, 2021 – China
- Pimoa duiba Zhang & Li, 2020 – China
- Pimoa edenticulata Hormiga, 1994 – United States
- Pimoa exigua Irfan, Wang & Zhang, 2021 – China
- Pimoa gagna Zhang & Li, 2021 – India
- Pimoa gandhii Hormiga, 1994 – India
- Pimoa graphitica Mammola, Hormiga & Isaia, 2016 – Italy, France
- Pimoa guiqing Zhang & Li, 2021 – China
- Pimoa gyaca Zhang & Li, 2021 – China
- Pimoa gyara Zhang & Li, 2021 – China
- Pimoa gyirong Zhang & Li, 2021 – China
- Pimoa haden Chamberlin & Ivie, 1943 – Canada, United States
- Pimoa heishui Zhang & Li, 2021 – China
- Pimoa hespera (Gertsch & Ivie, 1936) – United States
- Pimoa indiscreta Hormiga, 1994 – India
- Pimoa jellisoni (Gertsch & Ivie, 1936) – United States
- Pimoa jinchuan Zhang & Li, 2021 – China
- Pimoa khaptad Zhang & Li, 2021 – Nepal
- Pimoa koshi Zhang & Li, 2021 – Nepal
- Pimoa lata Xu & Li, 2009 – China
- Pimoa laurae Hormiga, 1994 – United States
- Pimoa lemenba Zhang & Li, 2020 – China
- Pimoa lhatog Zhang & Li, 2021 – China
- Pimoa lihengae Griswold, Long & Hormiga, 1999 – China
- Pimoa mainling Zhang & Li, 2020 – China
- Pimoa mechi Zhang & Li, 2021 – Nepal
- Pimoa mephitis Hormiga, 1994 – United States
- Pimoa miandam Zhang & Li, 2021 – Pakistan
- Pimoa miero Zhang & Li, 2021 – China
- Pimoa mono Hormiga, 1994 – United States
- Pimoa mude Zhang & Li, 2021 – Nepal
- Pimoa muli Zhang & Li, 2021 – China
- Pimoa nainital Zhang & Li, 2021 – India
- Pimoa naran Zhang & Li, 2021 – Pakistan
- Pimoa nematoides Hormiga, 1994 – Nepal
- Pimoa ninglang Zhang & Li, 2021 – China
- Pimoa nyalam Zhang & Li, 2021 – China
- Pimoa nyingchi Zhang & Li, 2020 – China
- Pimoa petita Hormiga, 1994 – United States
- Pimoa phaplu Zhang & Li, 2021 – Nepal
- Pimoa pingwuensis Irfan, Wang, Zhao & Zhang, 2022 – China
- Pimoa putou Zhang & Li, 2021 – China
- Pimoa rara Zhang & Li, 2021 – Nepal
- Pimoa reniformis Xu & Li, 2007 – China
- Pimoa rongxar Zhang & Li, 2020 – China
- Pimoa rupicola (Simon, 1884) – France, Italy
- Pimoa samyai Zhang & Li, 2020 – China
- Pimoa sangri Zhang & Li, 2021 – China
- Pimoa shigatse Zhang & Li, 2021 – China
- Pimoa shimian Wang, Yao & Zhang, 2025 – China
- Pimoa shoja Zhang & Li, 2021 – India
- Pimoa sinuosa Hormiga, 1994 – Nepal
- Pimoa tehama Hormiga & Lew, 2014 – United States
- Pimoa tengchong Zhang & Li, 2021 – China
- Pimoa thaleri Trotta, 2009 – India
- Pimoa trifurcata Xu & Li, 2007 – China
- Pimoa vera Gertsch, 1951 – United States
- Pimoa wanglangensis Yuan, Zhao & Zhang, 2019 – China
- Pimoa wulipoensis Irfan, Wang & Zhang, 2021 – China
- Pimoa xiahe Zhang & Li, 2021 – China
- Pimoa xinjianensis Zhang & Li, 2019 – China
- Pimoa yadong Zhang & Li, 2020 – China
- Pimoa yajiangensis Irfan, Wang, Zhao & Zhang, 2022 – China
- Pimoa yejiei Zhang & Li, 2021 – China
- Pimoa yele Zhang & Li, 2021 – China
- Pimoa zayu Zhang & Li, 2021 – China
- Pimoa zekogensis Irfan, Wang, Zhao & Zhang, 2022 – China
- Pimoa zeluni Lin & Li, 2023 – China
- Pimoa zhigangi Zhang & Li, 2021 – China

=== Fossil species ===
The following species were all found in baltic amber from the Paleogene.

- Pimoa expandens Wunderlich, 2004
- Pimoa hormigai Wunderlich, 2004
- Pimoa inopinata Wunderlich, 2004
- Pimoa liedtkei Wunderlich, 2004
- Pimoa lingua Wunderlich, 2004
- Pimoa longiscapus Wunderlich, 2008
- Pimoa multicuspuli Wunderlich, 2004
- Pimoa obruens Wunderlich, 2008
