= Simpson Springs =

Coordinates: 40°2′16″N 112°47′11″W

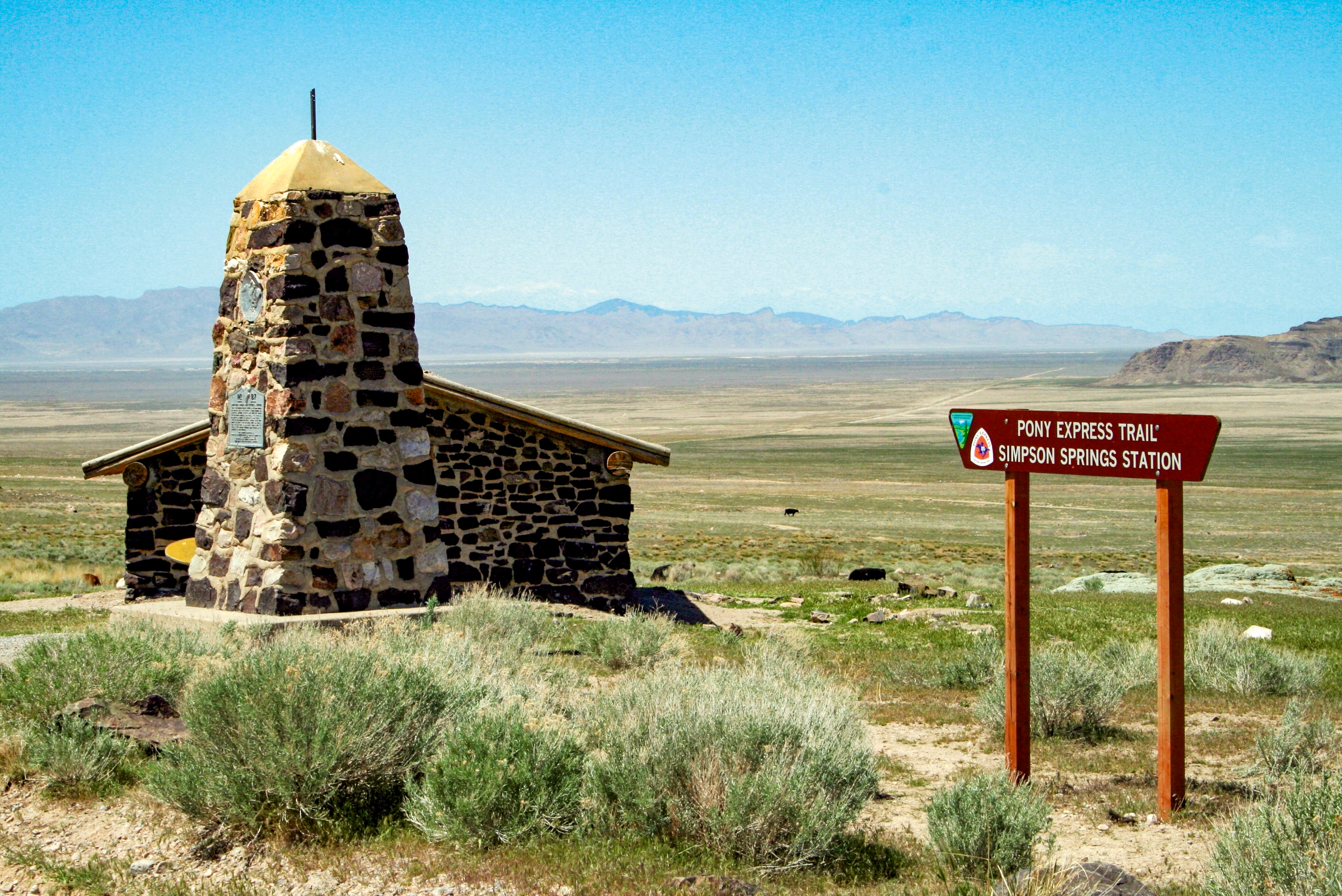
Simpson Springs Station on the Pony Express National Historic Trail, 2009

Simpson Springs is a spring, former Pony Express station, former Civilian Conservation Corps camp, and campground in southeast Tooele County, Utah, United States.

== Description ==
The springs are located about 13 miles (21 km) south of Dugway and about 19 miles (31 km) west of the town Vernon, on the southeastern corner of the Dugway Proving Ground. The site lies on the Simpson Springs Road portion of the historic Pony Express Trail and is situated Simpson Springs lies at an elevation of about 5,100 feet (1,600 m) on a bajada of the northwest flank of the Simpson Mountains, on the eastern edge of Dugway Valley, and has long been a water source on the trail west from Salt Lake City across the desert regions. (The Simpson Buttes lie a few miles to the west within the Dugway Proving Ground.) The Bureau of Land Management maintains a campground in the area.

== History ==
The site was undoubtedly used by Native Americans and possibly the Fremont Indian cultures due to its good water supply. The old river bed several miles west has provided evidence of indigenous activity.

The springs were first called Egan Spring for explorer Howard Egan, but renamed Simpson Springs for Captain James H. Simpson following his work to establish a military mail route to California in 1858.

Simpson Springs was established as an Overland Mail station by George Chorpenning for mule train connection between Salt Lake City and Sacramento. It later became an important Pony Express, Overland Stage, and later, Wells Fargo stations on the trail through Utah desert. The station was discontinued after completion of the first Transcontinental Railroad in 1869. It continued to be used for local freight between Fairfield and Ibapah into the 1890s.

The location was used as a Civilian Conservation Corps camp in the late 1930s and early 1940s. In January 1942, the U.S. military established Dugway Proving Ground in the area, which was occupied by military personnel through World War II. The existing building on the site was built by the Future Farmers of America as a replica in 1975.

Simpson Springs gained national attention in 2009 in connection with suspicious circumstances involving the disappearance of Susan Cox Powell in December of that year. She was last seen alive on the 6th and her husband, Joshua Powell, reported that later the same night (shortly after midnight) he had taken his two young sons camping at Simpson Springs and left her sleeping at their house in West Valley City, Utah. Law enforcement searched the Simpson Springs area later that week, but did not find anything. Susan has not been seen since, nor have her remains been found. (Fourteen months later, on February 5, 2012, Josh Powell and his two sons were killed in an apparent murder–suicide in Graham, Washington.)

== See also ==
- Butterfield Overland Mail
- Central Overland Route
