= Pleasant Valley (Nevada-Utah) =

Valley in the United States

Pleasant Valley, is a valley that is part of White Pine County, Nevada and Juab County, Utah. Its mouth is located at an elevation of 5,682 feet (1,732 meters) in Utah. Its head is at 39°44′09″N 114°09′53″W at an elevation of 6,965 feet (2,123 meters) in Nevada. It lies between the Kern Mountains on the south, and South Mountains to the northwest and the Deep Creek Range on the north.
