= Goshute, Utah =

Unincorporated community in Utah, United States

Coordinates: 39°52′34″N 114°00′00″W

Goshute is an unincorporated community in Juab County, Utah, United States on the Confederated Tribes of the Goshute Reservation. It lies at an elevation of 6,181 feet (1,884 m). Goshute is 8 miles (13 km) southeast of Eightmile, Nevada, the former site of Eightmile Station, (a Pony Express station, then a stagecoach station of the Overland Mail Company).

== See also ==
- List of ghost towns in Utah
