= Spring Creek Mountain =

Mountain in the state of Utah

Coordinates: 39°48′15″N 114°02′34″W

Spring Creek Mountain is a summit of the South Mountains in Juab County, Utah, but the mountain lies partly within White Pine County, Nevada.

The summit lies at an elevation of 9,071 feet (2,765 meters).
