= Deep Creek (Tooele County, Utah) =

Stream in Tooele County, Utah, U.S.

Deep Creek is a stream in Tooele County, Utah, USA. It heads in Deep Creek Valley at an elevation of 5,282 feet (1,610 m) at the confluence of West Deep Creek and East Deep Creek at 40°01′51″N 113°59′40″W. From there it flows northeast to dissipate in the Great Salt Lake Desert at an elevation of 4,255 feet (1,297 m). At times of high water the stream may flow to Tank Wash 11 miles (18 km) north northeast of Gold Hill.
