= Spring Creek Flat (Nevada/Utah) =

Flat landform in the state of Utah

Coordinates: 39°48′15″N 114°02′34″W

Spring Creek Flat is a flat mostly in White Pine County, Nevada; but also partly in Juab County, Utah and still less in Tooele County, Utah.

Its elevation varies but is on at its highest point in the south is 6,686 feet (2,038 meters), and tapers downward gradually to the north to an east west line about a mile and a half south of Eightmile, Nevada, approximately 5,741 feet (1,750 meters).
