= Woodman Peak (California) =

Summit in Mendocino County, California

- Location within California Location within the United States

Highest point
- Elevation: 2,940 ft (900 m)
- Prominence: 189 ft (58 m)
- Coordinates: 39°42′38.64″N 123°27′22.55″W

Geography
- Location: Mendocino County, California, United States
- Topo map: USGS Laytonville

Woodman Peak is a summit in Mendocino County, California. It rises to an elevation of 2,835 feet (864 meters) two miles northeast of Laytonville, California.
