= Pecado =

Scientific classification
- Kingdom: Animalia
- Phylum: Arthropoda
- Subphylum: Chelicerata
- Class: Arachnida
- Order: Araneae
- Infraorder: Araneomorphae
- Family: Linyphiidae
- Genus: Pecado; Hormiga & Scharff, 2005
- Species: P. impudicus

Binomial name
- Pecado impudicus (Denis, 1945)

Genus of spiders

Pecado is a monotypic genus of dwarf spiders containing the single species, Pecado impudicus. It was first described by G. Hormiga & N. Scharff in 2005, and has only been found in Spain, Morocco, and Algeria.
