= Johnson Canyon (Juab County, Utah) =

Valley in Utah, United States

Johnson Canyon is a valley or canyon in Juab County, Utah. Its creek drains the eastern watershed of the South Mountains and divides those mountains from the Deep Creek Range / Deep Creek Mountains to the east. The mouth of the canyon is at an elevation of 6,686 feet (2,038 meters). Its source is at the head of the canyon at an elevation of 2,530 feet (770 meters) at 39°45′22″N 114°01′48″W.
