= Woodman Peak (Utah) =

Lowest summit of Dutch Mountain, Utah

Coordinates: 40°12′14″N 113°51′59″W

Woodman Peak is the lowest summit on the southwestern end of the ridge of 7,794-foot Dutch Mountain in Tooele County, Utah. Woodman Peak lies 3 miles northwest of Gold Hill, Utah. Woodman Peak reaches an elevation of 7,234 feet (2,205 meters).
