= Putaoa =

Scientific classification
- Kingdom: Animalia
- Phylum: Arthropoda
- Subphylum: Chelicerata
- Class: Arachnida
- Order: Araneae
- Infraorder: Araneomorphae
- Family: Linyphiidae
- Genus: Putaoa; Hormiga & Tu, 2008

Type species
- P. huaping Hormiga & Tu, 2008

Species
- P. huaping Hormiga & Tu, 2008 – China; P. megacantha (Xu & Li, 2007) – China; P. seediq Hormiga & Dimitrov, 2017 – Taiwan

Genus of spiders

Putaoa is a genus of East Asian araneomorph spiders in the family Linyphiidae, and was first described by G. Hormiga & L. Tu in 2008. As of June 2019 it contains only three species, found only in Taiwan and China: P. huaping, P. megacantha, and P. seediq.
