= Ferber Peak =

Mountain in the state of Utah

Coordinates: 40°12′43″N 114°03′18″W

Ferber Peak is a summit in Elko County, Nevada. It rises to an elevation of 6,601 feet (2,012 meters).
