= Gosiute dialect =

Dialect of the Shoshoni language

Gosiute
- Native to: United States
- Region: Great Basin
- Ethnicity: Goshute
- Native speakers: 30 (2017)
- Language family: Uto-Aztecan: Northern; Numic; Central; Shoshoni; Gosiute

Language codes
- ISO 639-3: –
- Glottolog: gosi1242 Gosiute
- Distribution of Gosiute

Territory of the two Goshute communities: the Confederated Tribes of the Goshute Reservation and the Skull Valley Band of Goshute Indians

Gosiute (/ˈɡoʊʃuːt/) is a dialect of the endangered Shoshoni language historically spoken by the Goshute people of the American Great Basin in modern Nevada and Utah. Modern Gosiute speaking communities include the Confederated Tribes of the Goshute Reservation and the Skull Valley Band of Goshute Indians.

Gosiute place names in the Great Salt Lake area

== Status ==
=== Historical ===
==== 20th century ====
Research by Wick R. Miller documenting the use of Gosiute in family settings on the Goshute Reservation in the 1960s reported the dialect to remain in use as primary means of communication and described comparatively low displacement by English, a fact attributed to the reservation's geographic isolation. Miller additionally reported that younger speakers tended to use Gosiute most, though noted that such a tendency could be a function of the development of English proficiency with age. Monolingual speakers of Gosiute were reported as recently as 1970.

By 1994, language transmission to youth on the under 18 on the Goshute Reservation had become uncommon although fluent speakers represented the majority of the tribal members over 26 years of age.

==== 21st century ====
An estimated 20 to 30 fluent speakers of the dialect remain including only four in the Skull Valley band, though a number more are passive speakers. Although a few children in Goshute communities continue to learn the dialect as their first language, the majority of fluent speakers are over 50.

== Phonology ==
Distinct from other dialects of Shoshoni is the Gosiute use of the interdental affricate [t̪θ] in the place of the strident alveolar affricate [ts]. Speakers of Gosiute may also drop the initial [h].

== Documentation ==
A great deal of early documentation of Gosiute was carried out by ethnobotanist and ethnographer Ralph Chamberlin who compiled and published Gosiute plant, animal, and place names in the first decades of the 20th century.

Linguist Wick R. Miller published a number of works on Shoshoni including a 1972 dictionary and collection of texts that includes several Gosiute texts.

The description of Shoshoni in Volume 17 of the Handbook of North American Indians is based on the Gosiute dialect.

== Revitalization efforts ==
A 1997 plan to store nuclear waste on the Skull Valley Reservation allotted funds to develop a cultural center with language programs; however, the plans were halted.

The Ibapah primary school taught classes in Gosiute in the 2000s although such courses have since stopped.
