= Confederated Tribes of the Goshute Reservation =

Indian reservation in Utah and Nevada, United States

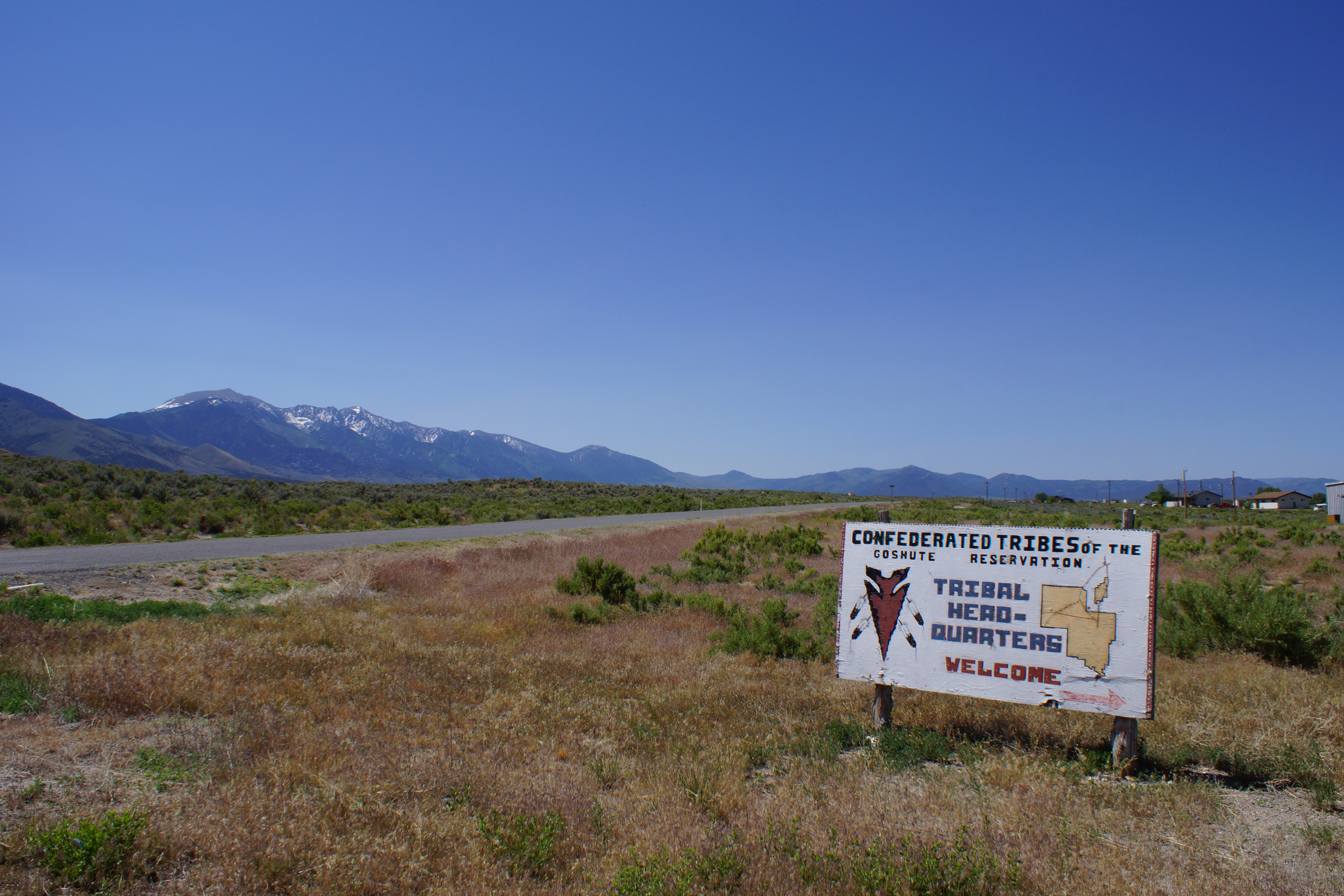
- Welcome sign in Ibapah, Utah

Total population
- 400 enrolled citizens

Regions with significant populations
- United States(Nevada, Utah)

Languages
- Shoshoni language, English

Religion
- Native American Church, The Church of Jesus Christ of Latter-day Saints

Related ethnic groups
- other Western Shoshone peoples, Ute people

The Confederated Tribes of the Goshute Reservation are located in Juab County, Utah, Tooele County, Utah, and White Pine County, Nevada, United States. They are one of two federally recognized tribes of Goshute people, the other being the Skull Valley Band of Goshute Indians of Utah.

Map of the Goshute Reservation

== Government ==
The tribe's headquarters is in Ibapah, Utah. They are led by a democratically elected tribal council. In 2025, their tribal chairman is Amos Murphy.

The tribe has approximately 400 citizens.

== Name ==
Their name for themselves is Ai'bĭm-pa / Aipimpaa Newe ("People of Deep Creek Valley").

Their capital of Ibapah is an English adaptation of a Goshute term, either from Ai'ba-pa (one name of the last chief of the tribe who was also known under the common chieftain name ta'bi) or from Ai-bim-pa / Ai'bĭm-pa ("White Clay Water" referring to the nearby Deep Creek).

== Reservation ==
Approximately 200 tribal citizens live on the reservation, which is located in White Pine County in eastern Nevada and Juab, and Tooele Counties in western Utah. The reservation was established by Executive Order on May 20, 1912. Today, the reservation is 122,085 acres (494.06 km^{2}) large.

== Economic development ==
The local economy is focused on agriculture, and some tribal citizens ranch cattle and cultivate hay.

== Language ==
They speak the Goshute dialect of the Shoshone language, one of the Numic languages.
