= Kern Mountains =

Mountain range in the United States

- Location within Nevada Location within the United States

Highest point
- Elevation: 2,627 m (8,619 ft)

Geography
- Country: United States
- States: Nevada and Utah
- Region: Great Basin
- Counties: White Pine (Nevada) and Juab (Utah)
- Range coordinates: 39°41′54.788″N 114°11′33.013″W
- Topo map: USGS Blue Mass Canyon

The Kern Mountains are a mountain range primarily on the eastern edge of White Pine County, Nevada, United States, but extending slightly east into western Juab County, Utah.

== Description ==
The range lies between the Antelope Valley on the northwest, the South Mountains and the Pleasant Valley on the northeast, the Snake Valley on the east and south, the Snake Range on the south, and the Spring Valley on the west.

== See also ==
- List of mountain ranges of Nevada
- List of mountain ranges of Utah
