= Ibapah, Utah =

Unincorporated community in the state of Utah, United States

Ibapah
- Unincorporated community
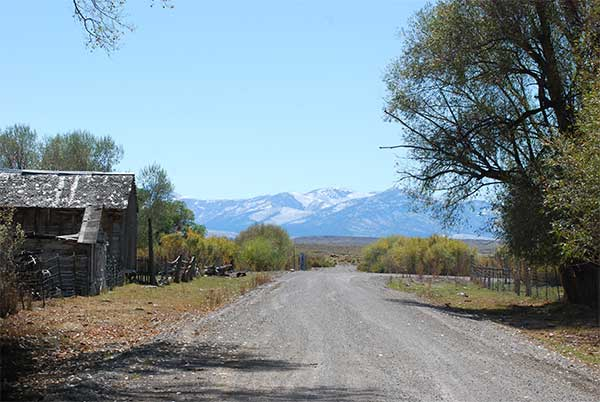
- The roadway through Ibapah, September 2007

- Location within the state of Utah
- Coordinates: 40°02′12″N 113°59′07″W
- Country: United States
- State: Utah
- County: Tooele
- Settled: 1859
- Named for: Goshute Ai-bim-pa "White Clay Water"
- Elevation: 5,282 ft (1,610 m)
- Time zone: UTC-7 (Mountain (MST))
  - Summer (DST): UTC-6 (MDT)
- ZIP code: 84034
- Area code: 435
- GNIS feature ID: 1437592

Ibapah (/ˈaɪbəpɑː/ EYE-bə-pah) is a small unincorporated community in far western Tooele County, Utah, United States, near the Nevada state line. The community is the headquarters of the Confederated Tribes of the Goshute Reservation and the inhabitants are mostly members of the Goshute Native American (Indian) tribe.

== Description ==
Historical population
Census	Pop.	Note	%±
1860	6		—
1880	174		—
1890	117		−32.8%
1900	353		201.7%
1910	256		−27.5%
1920	120		−53.1%
1930	152		26.7%
1940	133		−12.5%
1950	70		−47.4%
Source: U.S. Census Bureau

The settlement is located near the Deep Creek Mountains. The site was originally established in 1859 by Mormon missionaries sent to teach the local Native Americans farming methods. A Pony Express station operated here in 1860 and 1861, and the town was on an early alignment of the Lincoln Highway. A post office operated here from 1883 to 1980. Ibapah is currently inhabited mostly by Goshute people, with scattered farmlands and a trading post belonging to more recent settlers. The community is the headquarters of the Confederated Tribes of the Goshute Reservation, a federally recognized tribe.

Originally named Deep Creek for a creek of the same name in the area, the name was later changed to Ibapah, an anglicized form of the Goshute word Ai-bim-pa or Ai'bĭm-pa which means "White Clay Water".

The town is isolated and is usually reached by going out of Utah into Nevada and back into Utah.

== Climate ==
The climate is typical of that of a high elevation Great Basin location, being semi-arid and featuring, in consequence, large differences in temperature between day and night.

Climate data for Ibapah, Utah, 1991–2020 normals, 1903–2020 extremes: 5279ft (1609m)
Month	Jan	Feb	Mar	Apr	May	Jun	Jul	Aug	Sep	Oct	Nov	Dec	Year
Record high °F (°C)	68 (20)	75 (24)	82 (28)	89 (32)	98 (37)	105 (41)	111 (44)	108 (42)	102 (39)	94 (34)	80 (27)	73 (23)	111 (44)
Mean maximum °F (°C)	58.6 (14.8)	63.6 (17.6)	74.6 (23.7)	80.8 (27.1)	88.9 (31.6)	96.5 (35.8)	102.2 (39.0)	100.4 (38.0)	94.5 (34.7)	84.5 (29.2)	71.3 (21.8)	60.4 (15.8)	103.0 (39.4)
Mean daily maximum °F (°C)	45.0 (7.2)	49.1 (9.5)	58.3 (14.6)	64.1 (17.8)	73.2 (22.9)	84.9 (29.4)	94.2 (34.6)	92.8 (33.8)	82.9 (28.3)	69.0 (20.6)	54.7 (12.6)	44.7 (7.1)	67.7 (19.9)
Daily mean °F (°C)	28.7 (−1.8)	32.9 (0.5)	40.8 (4.9)	46.2 (7.9)	54.1 (12.3)	63.0 (17.2)	71.0 (21.7)	69.2 (20.7)	60.0 (15.6)	48.2 (9.0)	36.7 (2.6)	28.4 (−2.0)	48.3 (9.0)
Mean daily minimum °F (°C)	12.4 (−10.9)	16.8 (−8.4)	23.3 (−4.8)	28.3 (−2.1)	35.0 (1.7)	41.2 (5.1)	47.9 (8.8)	45.5 (7.5)	37.1 (2.8)	27.4 (−2.6)	18.8 (−7.3)	12.0 (−11.1)	28.8 (−1.8)
Mean minimum °F (°C)	−8.8 (−22.7)	−3.6 (−19.8)	9.5 (−12.5)	16.7 (−8.5)	21.5 (−5.8)	29.6 (−1.3)	37.0 (2.8)	34.3 (1.3)	22.8 (−5.1)	12.2 (−11.0)	1.5 (−16.9)	−7.5 (−21.9)	−13.9 (−25.5)
Record low °F (°C)	−39 (−39)	−32 (−36)	−17 (−27)	2 (−17)	8 (−13)	20 (−7)	23 (−5)	21 (−6)	10 (−12)	−5 (−21)	−18 (−28)	−38 (−39)	−39 (−39)
Average precipitation inches (mm)	0.79 (20)	0.87 (22)	1.09 (28)	1.44 (37)	1.41 (36)	0.90 (23)	0.71 (18)	0.77 (20)	0.68 (17)	0.69 (18)	0.54 (14)	0.63 (16)	10.52 (269)
Average snowfall inches (cm)	6.10 (15.5)	6.70 (17.0)	4.20 (10.7)	1.80 (4.6)	0.00 (0.00)	0.00 (0.00)	0.00 (0.00)	0.00 (0.00)	0.00 (0.00)	0.60 (1.5)	3.80 (9.7)	6.70 (17.0)	29.9 (76)
Source 1: NOAA
Source 2: XMACIS2 (records & 1991-2020 monthly max/mins)
