= Gold Hill, Utah =

Gold Hill
- Unincorporated community
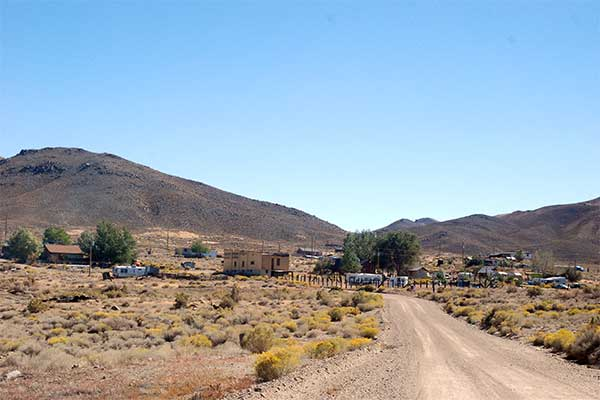
- Gold Hill, Utah, September 2007

- Location within Utah Location within the United States
- Coordinates: 40°09′59″N 113°49′50″W
- Country: United States
- State: Utah
- County: Tooele
- Founded: 1871
- Named for: The presence of gold in the nearby hills
- Elevation: 5,302 ft (1,616 m)
- GNIS feature ID: 1428231

Gold Hill is an unincorporated community in far western Tooele County, Utah, located near the Nevada state line.

== History ==
The town, located near the Deep Creek Mountains, was the center of a mining district that was active in the late nineteenth and early twentieth centuries, producing gold, copper, arsenic, silver, lead and tungsten. Gold Hill was the southern terminus of the Deep Creek Railroad.

Although gold was first discovered at Gold Hill in 1858, settlement only began in 1871, when a smelter was built. The town itself was established in 1892. As other nearby mines started to fail, Gold Hill began to grow famous in the mining industry. Its ore was among the richest known at the time. After the rich copper and gold mines were worked out, the area enjoyed a resurgence when World War I created a demand for arsenic. A smaller period of growth occurred during World War II, after which mining was discontinued. Gold Hill is now nearly a ghost town, with only a few remaining residents.

Jack Dempsey mined there before beginning his boxing career. A United States post office operated at Gold Hill from 1911 to 1949.

The site is currently a ghost town with many structures still intact and available to explore.

== Gold Hill Mine ==
Originally called the Western Utah Mine, Gold Hill Mine was created in the 1890s, and expanded with the arrival of the railroad in 1917. Mining ended in 1925, when the market for arsenic collapsed. The mine will likely be permanently closed in the near future. According to a United States Geological Survey (USGS) report published in 1935, the property was owned at the time by Western Utah Copper Company. The mine produced over half of the total of 33,960 tons of ore valued at $705,957 from the entire district.

== See also ==
- List of ghost towns in Utah
