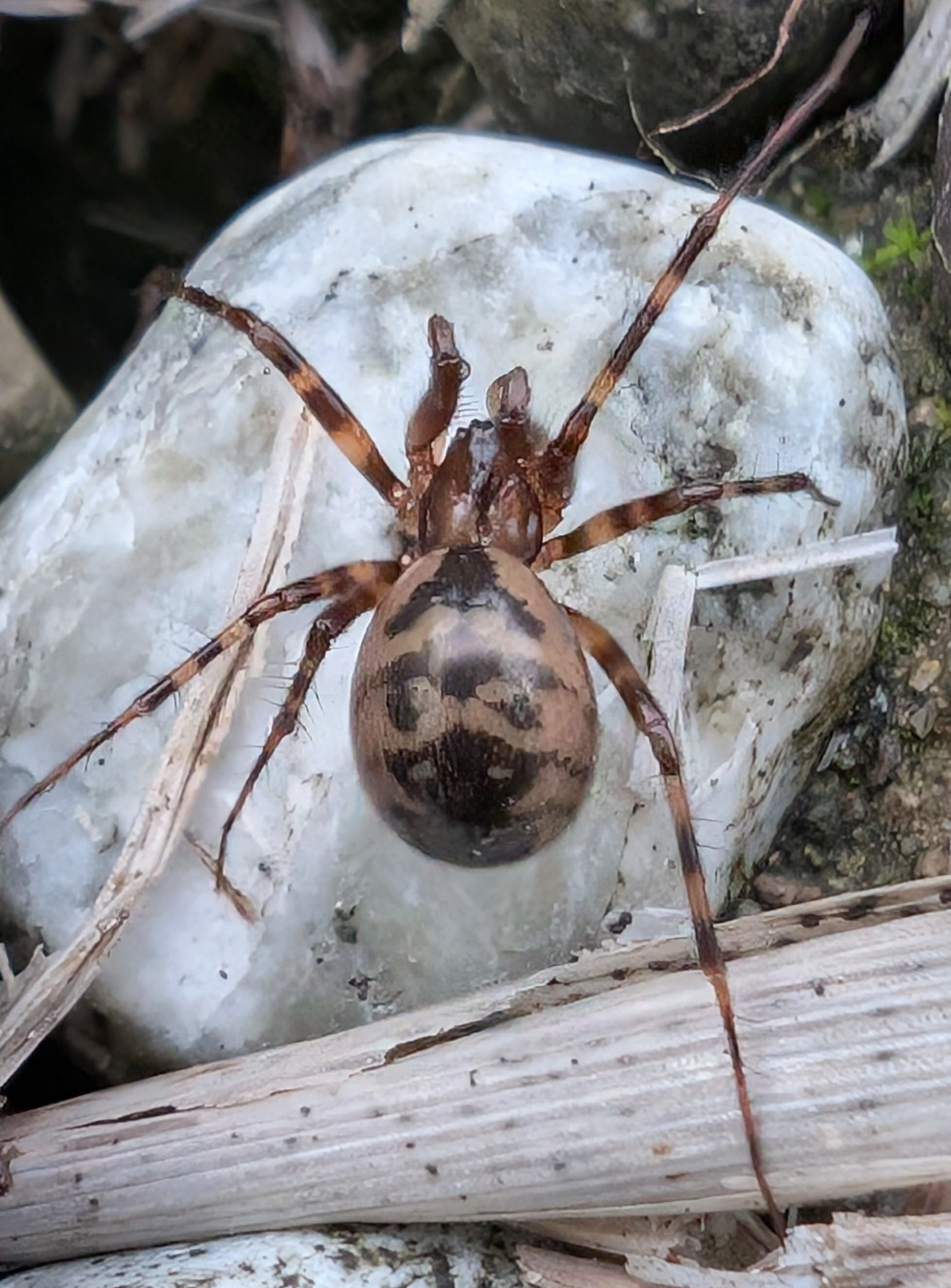
- Pimoa altioculata in Seattle, USA
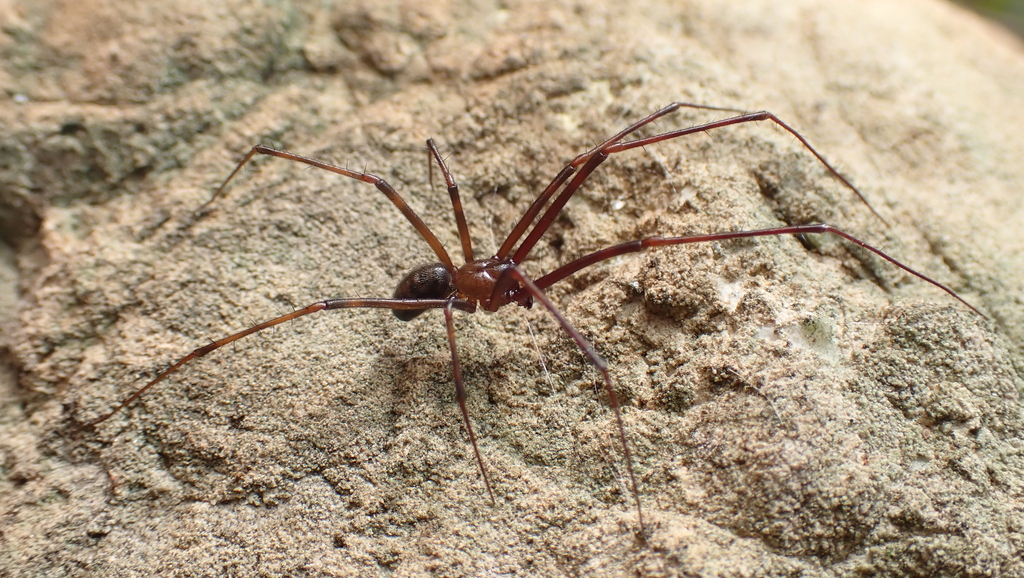
- male Pimoa rupicola in France

Scientific classification
- Kingdom: Animalia
- Phylum: Arthropoda
- Subphylum: Chelicerata
- Class: Arachnida
- Order: Araneae
- Infraorder: Araneomorphae
- Family: Pimoidae; Wunderlich, 1986

Diversity
- 2 genera, 87 species
- blue: reported countries (WSC) green: observation hotspots (iNaturalist)

= Pimoidae =

Pimoidae Temporal range: Palaeogene–present

Family of spiders

Pimoidae is a small family of araneomorph spiders first described by Jörg Wunderlich in 1986. As re-circumscribed in 2021, it is monophyletic, and contained around 90 species in two genera. It is closely related to the Linyphiidae, and is sometimes treated as synonymous with that family.

The species Pimoa cthulhu, described by Gustavo Hormiga in 1994, is named for Howard Phillips Lovecraft's mythological deity Cthulhu.

== Distribution ==
The ancestors of the family are thought to have been widely distributed across the Palearctic, Nearctic and Sino-Japanese regions, but species now have a more fragmented distribution.

== Genera ==
As of January 2026, this family includes two genera and 87 species:

- Nanoa Hormiga, Buckle & Scharff, 2005 – United States
- Pimoa Chamberlin & Ivie, 1943 – China, India, Nepal, Pakistan, Italy, Spain, France, North America
