= List of mountains in Utah =

Nature's masterpiece :Utah's Diverse Mountain Range

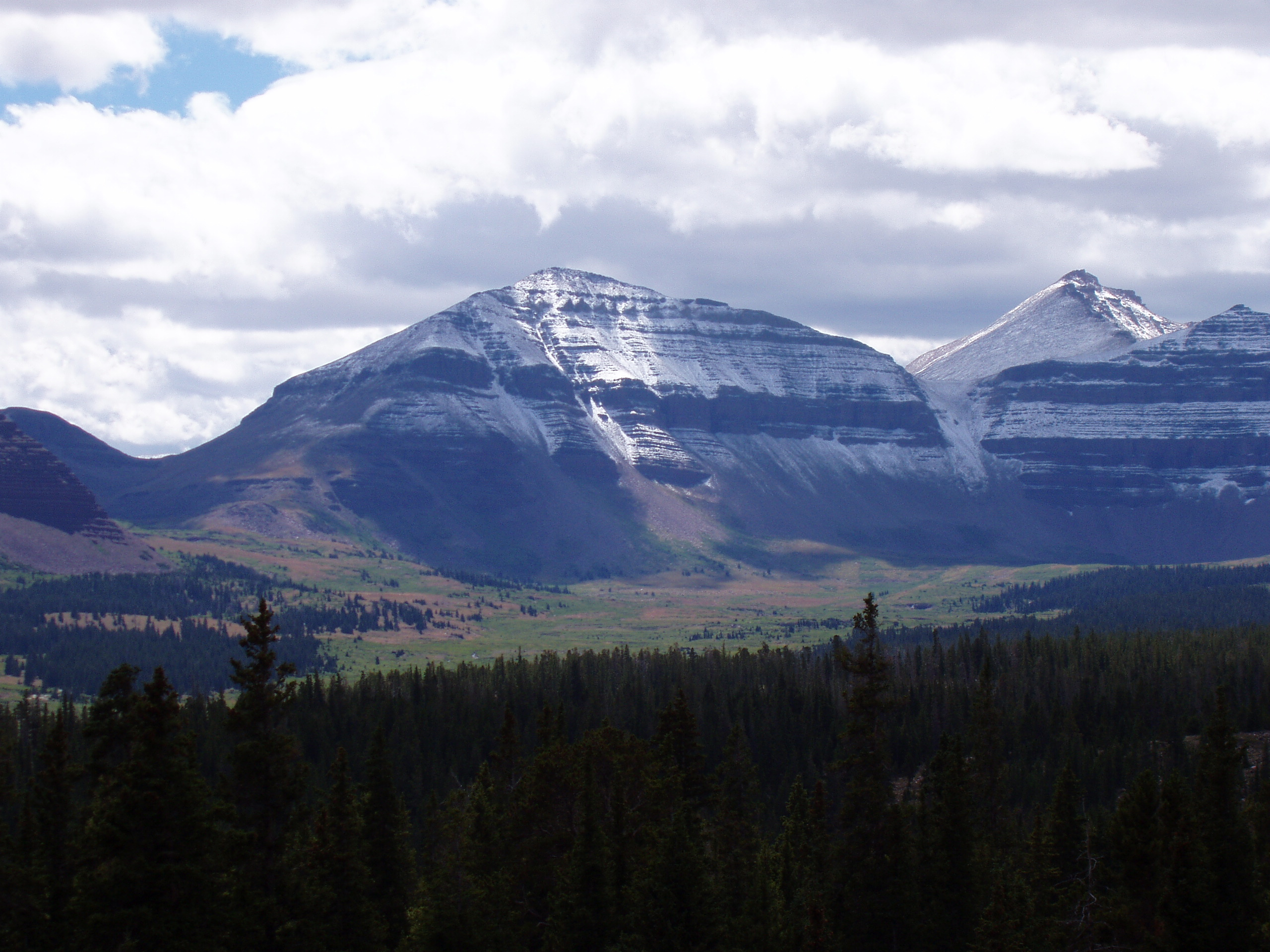
Kings Peak (Utah) in August 2004

Mountains in Utah are numerous and have varying elevations and prominences.

Kings Peak, in the Uinta Mountains in Duchesne County, Utah, is the highest point in the state and has the greatest prominence. It has elevation 13,528 feet (4,123 m) and prominence 6,348 feet (1,935 m). It also has topographic isolation of 166.6 miles (268.1 km), highest amongst summits of Utah having at least 500 meters of prominence.

For lists of the top 50 peaks in Utah by elevation, prominence, and topographic isolation, see List of mountain peaks of Utah. This "List of mountains in Utah" should include all of those (but does not yet) and more.

To see locations of all mountains having coordinates in this article (primarily from just three counties in the state, so far) together in one map, click on "Map all coordinates using OSM" at the right side of this page.

Partial lists of mountains in just a few of Utah's 29 counties are below.

== Salt Lake County ==
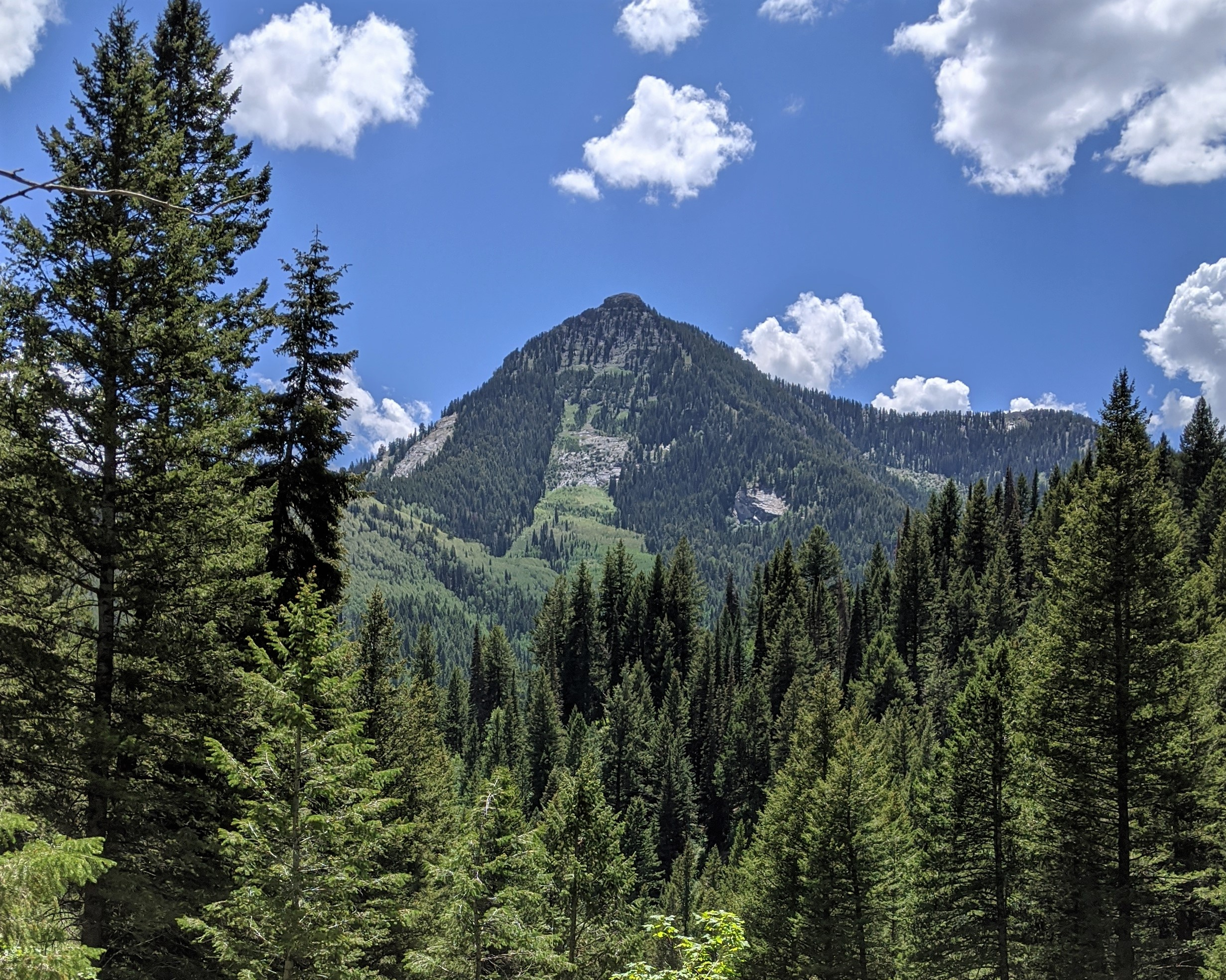
Kesler Peak in Wasatch Range from the north in 2020

Mountains in Salt Lake County, Utah include:

Mountain	Location	Elevation	Prominence	Notes
Mount Aire	40.719880°N 111.695472°W	8,621 feet (2,628 m)	581 feet (177 m)	
Bald Mountain	40.792276°N 111.648614°W			
Mount Baldy	40.567884°N 111.638124°W	11,068 feet (3,374 m)	368 feet (112 m)	
Barneys Peak	40.585379°N 112.174433°W			
Black Mountain	40.822912°N 111.761679°W			
Black Ridge	40.448358°N 112.087649°W			
Clayton Peak	40.590620°N 111.560034°W	10,721 feet (3,268 m)	701 feet (214 m)	
Clipper Peak	40.513352°N 112.187568°W			
Curry Peak	40.573362°N 112.140177°W			
Dromedary Peak	40.592771°N 111.705904°W	11,107 feet (3,385 m)	367 feet (112 m)	
Farnsworth Peak	40.659293°N 112.202117°W	9,039 feet (2,755 m)	1,243 feet (379 m)	Peak on the northern end of the Oquirrh Mountain range, approximately 18 miles (29 km) southwest of Salt Lake City. The peak is named for Philo Farnsworth, the inventor of the first completely electronic television, and it is used mainly for radio and television transmission.
Freeman Peak	40.557220°N 112.168572°W			
Gobblers Knob	40.670639°N 111.682641°W	10,246 feet (3,123 m)	1,486 feet (453 m)	
Grandeur Peak	40.707052°N 111.759861°W	8,299 feet (2,530 m)	739 feet (225 m)	
Grandview Peak	40.851109°N 111.752263°W	9,410 feet (2,868 m)	1,910 feet (582 m)	
Hidden Peak	40.560829°N 111.644999°W			
Honeycomb Cliffs	40.597964°N 111.610356°W			
Kesler Peak	40.624933°N 111.668843°W	10,403 feet (3,171 m)	443 feet (135 m)	
Knee Weakener	40.639921°N 112.141393°W	6,860 feet (2,090 m)		
Little Mountain	40.795559°N 111.690511°W			
Little Water Peak	40.671502°N 111.628007°W			
Lookout Peak	40.834241°N 111.717541°W			
Markham Peak	40.545690°N 112.179276°W			
Mount Millicent	40.5904837°N 111.5975384°W	10,452 feet (3,186 m)	192 feet (59 m)	
Murdock Peak	40.693629°N 111.604432°W			
Nelson Peak	40.613550°N 112.187400°W	9,359 feet (2,853 m)	1,699 feet (518 m)	
O'Sullivan Peak	40.590700°N 111.710947°W	11,275 feet (3,437 m)	495 feet (151 m)	
Mount Olympus	40.656625°N 111.770748°W			
Mount Raymond	40.658429°N 111.701936°W	10,241 feet (3,121 m)	881 feet (269 m)	
Reed and Benson Ridge	40.604647°N 111.644790°W			
Scott Hill	40.624115°N 111.567545°W			
South Mountain	40.466492°N 112.039150°W			
Sugarloaf Mountain	40.565778°N 111.624860°W	11,051 feet (3,368 m)	551 feet (168 m)	
Sunset Peak	40.5769715°N 111.5936059°W	10,648 feet (3,246 m)	228 feet (69 m)	In Salt Lake, Wasatch and Utah counties
Superior Peak aka Mount Superior	40.591188°N 111.671241°W			
Mount Tuscarora	40.5841120°N 111.5987985°W	10,646 feet (3,245 m)	85 feet (26 m)	
Twin Peaks	40.593664°N 111.720990°W			
Twin Peaks	Salt Lake County and Utah County; 40.551895°N 111.656591°W			
White Baldy	40.532903°N 111.681471°W			
Mount Van Cott	40.781616°N 111.822759°W			
Mount Wire	40.769475°N 111.798459°W			
Mount Wolverine	40.585126°N 111.603588°W	10,795 feet (3,290 m)	575 feet (175 m)	

== Utah County ==
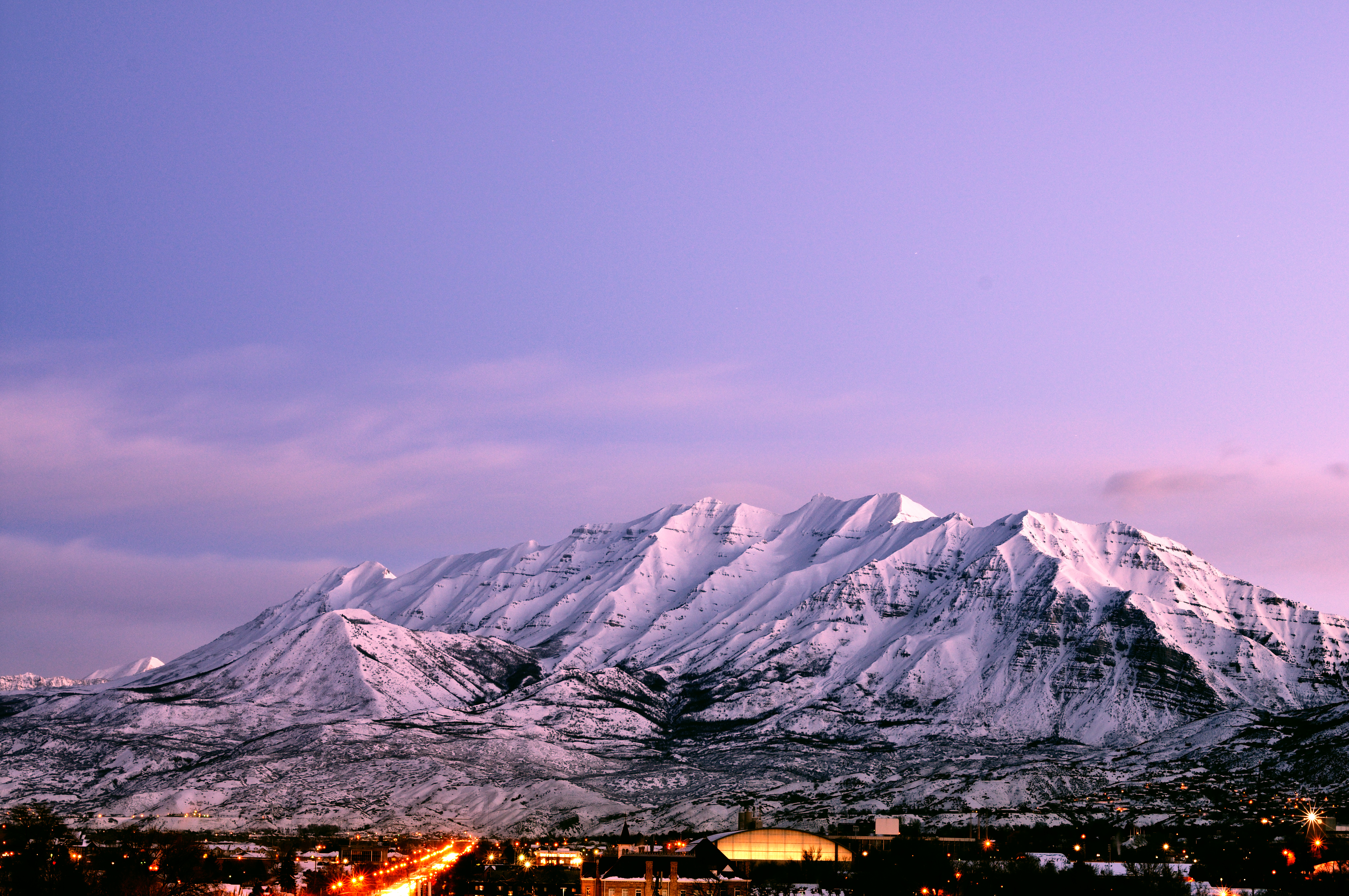
Mount Timpanogos ("Timp") from Provo in 2008

Mountains in Utah County, Utah include:

Mountain	Location	Elevation	Prominence	Notes
Bald Knoll	40.258454°N 111.519187°W			
a second Bald Knoll peak	40.300640°N 111.458906°W			
a third Bald Knoll peak	40.387929°N 112.135590°W			
Bald Mountain	39.877082°N 111.758064°W			
Big Baldy	40.386154°N 111.643868°W			
Billies Mountain	40.004600°N 111.274100°W			
Bismark Peak	40.018880°N 112.125608°W			
Blowhole Hill	40.098600°N 112.033759°W			
Bone Yard				
Box Elder Peak	40.489752°N 111.696460°W			
Browns Peak				
Buckhorn Mountain	39.853543°N 112.080620°W			
Buckley Mountain	40.213657°N 111.588338°W			
Butterfield Peaks	40.466967°N 112.172961°W			
Cascade Mountain	40.306832°N 111.588531°W			
Cat Hill	40.131229°N 111.997078°W			
Cat Peak				
Cedar Knoll				
Cedar Knoll				
Cedar Knoll				
Cedar Knolls				
Cedar Point	40.245100°N 111.585300°W			
Clyde Knoll	40.082700°N 111.572400°W			
Corral Mountain	40.228663°N 111.554375°W			
Davis Hill	39.562000°N 111.171500°W			
Dominguez Hill	40.043500°N 111.354500°W			
Driveway Flat	39.899432°N 111.282106°W			
Dry Mountain	39.940392°N 111.731501°W			
East Hamongog	40.294900°N 111.444300°W			
Ether Peak	40.083700°N 111.313800°W			
Fifth Water Ridge	Wasatch or Utah County; 40.080600°N 111.161800°W			
First Hamongog	40.294600°N 111.451600°W			
Flat Top Mountain	40.372508°N 112.188785°W			
Freedom Peak	40.260797°N 111.544759°W			
Gentle Band Ridge	39.885064°N 111.652884°W			
Goshen Hill	39.594700°N 111.483000°W			
Granger Mountain	40.193130°N 111.480320°W			
Greeley Hill	40.115331°N 112.016001°W			
Grindstone Ridge	40.145402°N 111.519440°W			
Hannifin Peak	Juab or Utah County; 39.997686°N 112.150245°W			
High Peak	39.561300°N 111.133900°W			
Horse Mountain				
Indian Head	39.876374°N 110.902287°W			
Indian Head Peak	39.868721°N 110.994760°W			
Iron Hill	40.132900°N 111.531400°W			
Jumpoff, The	40.233600°N 112.104200°W			
Kelsey Peak	40.451984°N 112.214356°W			
Knolls, The	40.120100°N 111.532100°W			
Lake Mountains	40.274892°N 111.900524°W			
Landrock	40.194900°N 111.550400°W			
Latimer Point	40.434200°N 112.014143°W			
Lewiston Peak				
Lightning Peak				
Lime Peak	39.979920°N 112.076507°W			
Little Baldy	40.212800°N 111.390100°W			
Little Hill	39.565400°N 112.041100°W			
Little Mountain	40.012800°N 111.425500°W			
Loafer Mountain	39.976037°N 111.616041°W			
Location				
Lone Peak	40.526832°N 111.756027°W	11,260 feet (3,430 m)	893 feet (272 m)	One of the taller peaks in the Wasatch Range along the Wasatch Front, the peak ranks 98th on a list of Utah peaks with 500 feet (150 m) topographic prominence. The first person in recorded history to successfully hike Lone Peak was Richard Bell, Sr. of Riverton, Utah. Lone Peak consists almost entirely of quartz monzonite (a granitoid, or granite-like) rock of the 30.5 million year old Little Cottonwood Stock.
Lone Rock	40.295200°N 111.471900°W			
Long Ridge	Juab or Utah County; 39.814168°N 111.960861°W			
Lowe Peak	40.4255447°N 112.1987548°W	10,589 feet (3,228 m)	1,369 feet (417 m)	
Lone Peak Ridge	40.047640°N 111.584514°W			
Mahogany Mountain	40.409931°N 111.714111°W	9,000 feet (2,743 m)	634 feet (193 m)	
Mill Canyon Peak	40.495937°N 111.576569°W			
Miller Hill	40.544649°N 111.621065°W			
Miller Ridge	40.027268°N 111.317125°W			
Mineral Hill	39.565200°N 112.035500°W			
Mollies Nipple	40.090800°N 111.222300°W			
a second Mollies Nipple peak	40.001500°N 111.431400°W			
Mount Nebo	39.821832°N 111.760221°W			
Nielson Knoll	39.570500°N 111.341200°W			
North Fork Ridge	40.434403°N 111.600811°W			
North Hill	39.575200°N 112.043300°W			
North Peak	39.838338°N 111.749784°W			
Old Baldy	39.592000°N 112.073900°W			
Packard Peak	39.582600°N 112.072500°W			
Pinyon Peak	39.994532°N 112.065895°W			
Point 8365 East	39.939816°N 111.091575°W			
Powerhouse Mountain	40.176412°N 111.524870°W			
Provo Peak	40.243983°N 111.556754°W			
Pumphouse Hill	40.170805°N 111.369333°W			
Rattlesnake Mountain	40.275483°N 111.421255°W			
Rattlesnake Point	40.085000°N 111.325300°W			
Red Mountain	40.127268°N 111.367670°W			
Red Pine Knoll	40.242894°N 111.413809°W			
Roberts Horn	40.399592°N 111.637434°W			
Round Peak	40.102900°N 111.350300°W			
Santaquin Peak	39.983290°N 111.623849°W			
Second Hamongog	40.301800°N 111.451000°W			
Sheepherder Hill	39.560300°N 111.411300°W			
Sheps Ridge	40.428020°N 112.108798°W			
Sioux Peak	Juab or Utah County; 39.560800°N 112.060100°W			
Sky High	39.959660°N 111.387715°W			
South Apex Hill	39.560900°N 112.030700°W			
Spanish Fork Peak	40.087495°N 111.527800°W	10,192 feet (3,107 m)	2,972 feet (906 m)	
Squaw Mountain	40.161900°N 111.365600°W			
Strawberry Ridge	40.251995°N 111.276605°W			
Summit, The	39.573400°N 112.060400°W			
Tanner Ridge	40.127514°N 111.320806°W			
Teat Mountain	40.027740°N 111.369980°W			
Tenmile Hill	40.063100°N 112.065400°W			
Thorpe Hills HP	40.219011°N 112.152831°W			
Three Sisters	40.110500°N 111.350600°W			
Timber Mountain	40.095900°N 111.212200°W			
Mount Timpanogos	40.390607°N 111.645859°W			
Timpanogos North Peak				
Timpanogos South Peak				
Tintic Mountain	39.819569°N 112.068980°W			
Tithing Mountain	40.009740°N 111.701905°W			
Toad Head	40.130900°N 111.362400°W			
Tucker Peak	39.896990°N 111.155198°W			
Twin Peaks	Salt Lake and Utah counties 40.551895°N 111.656591°W			
Twin Knolls	39.868410°N 111.688544°W			
Two Tom Hill	40.177068°N 111.295642°W			
Unnamed Timp Peak				
Unnamed Timp Peak				
Unnamed Timp Peak				
Unnamed Timp Peak				
Wanless Hill	40.077063°N 112.027438°W			
Wardsworth Peak	40.259102°N 111.347198°W			
Warm Springs Mountain	39.957861°N 111.848484°W			
West Mountain	40.089027°N 111.821840°W			
White Knoll	40.095400°N 111.574200°W			
Y Mountain	40.256850°N 111.606655°W			

== Emery County ==
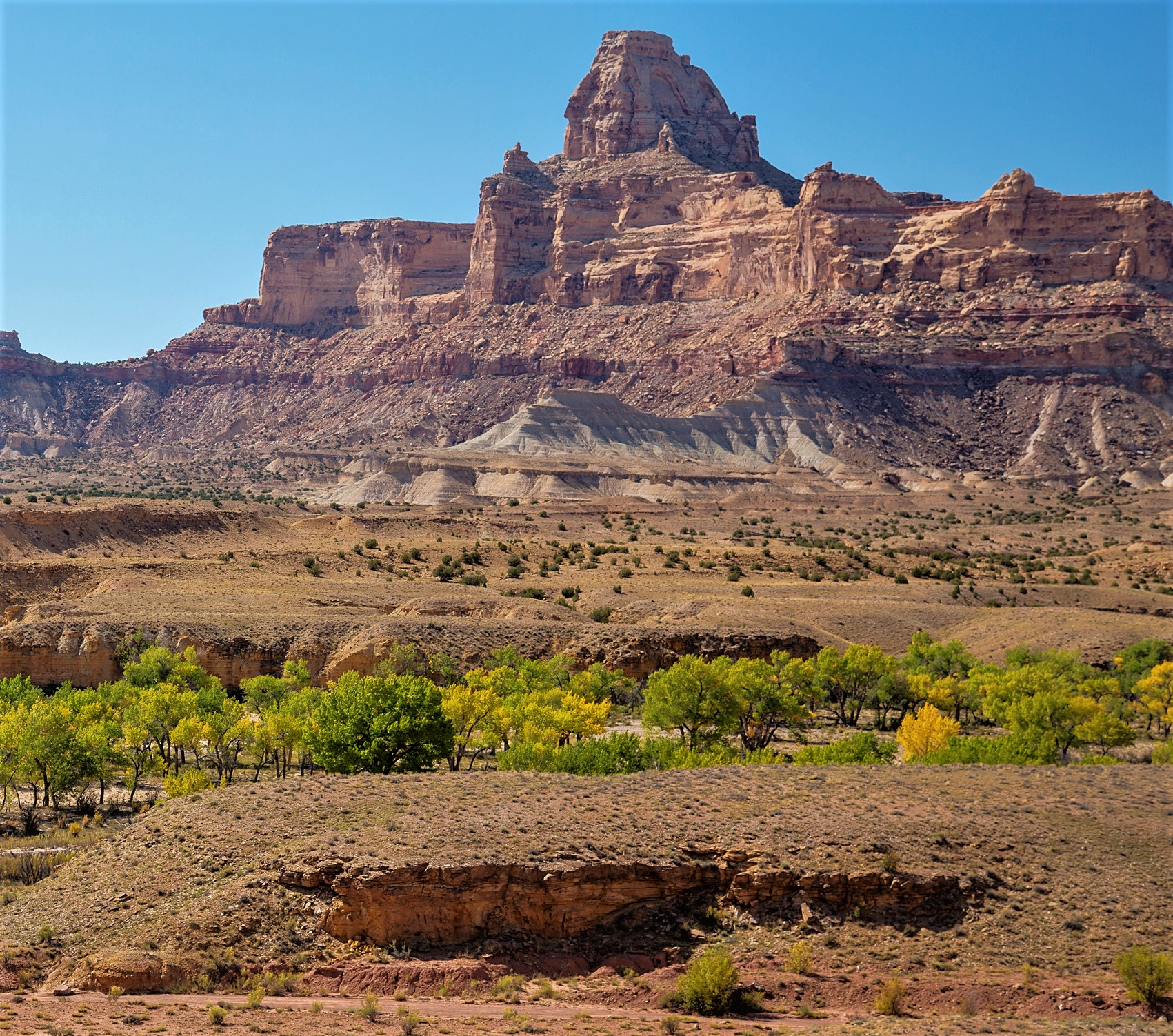
Window Blind Peak in 2016

Emery County, Utah has 185 named peaks. Its 483 highest peaks, including many unnamed ones and many secondary ones (not necessarily deemed separate mountains), range in elevation from 10,743 feet (3,274 m) down to 4,360 feet (1,330 m).

The following table includes the 10 mountains having highest elevation and the 10 mountains having highest prominence (with Candland Mountain, Cedar Mountain, East Mountain, and Monument Peak being in both top 10s). And it includes selected other mountains in Emery County (including Factory Butte (Emery County, Utah)). These Emery County mountains are:

Mountain	Location	Elevation	Prominence	Notes
East Mountain		3,276 metres (10,748 ft)	483 metres (1,585 ft)	
Monument Peak	39.614°N 111.176°W	3,183 metres (10,443 ft)	491 metres (1,611 ft)	
Candland Mountain		3,159 metres (10,364 ft)	436 metres (1,430 ft)	
Seeley Mountain		3,154 metres (10,348 ft)	234 metres (768 ft)	
Hoag Ridge		3,093 metres (10,148 ft)	231 metres (758 ft)	
Gentry Mountain		3,082 metres (10,112 ft)	51 metres (167 ft)	
Trail Mountain		3,076 metres (10,092 ft)	286 metres (938 ft)	
The Steeps		3,031 metres (9,944 ft)	72 metres (236 ft)	
Wild Cattle Ridge		3,005 metres (9,859 ft)	106 metres (348 ft)	
Bald Ridge		2,894 metres (9,495 ft)	61 metres (200 ft)	
Mount Elliott		2,178 metres (7,146 ft)	702 metres (2,303 ft)	
San Rafael Knob		2,409 metres (7,904 ft)	596 metres (1,955 ft)	
Cedar Mountain (Utah)		2,336 metres (7,664 ft)	572 metres (1,877 ft)	The Cedar Mountain Formation is the name given to a distinctive sedimentary geologic formation in eastern Utah, spanning most of the early and mid-Cretaceous. The formation was named for Cedar Mountain in northern Emery County, Utah, where William Lee Stokes first studied the exposures in 1944.
Window Blind Peak	39.0447°N 110.6563°W	2,148 metres (7,047 ft)	439 metres (1,440 ft)	Summit in the San Rafael Swell of Emery County, its first ascent was made September 23, 1973. It is a major erosional remnant along the San Rafael River and is composed of Wingate Sandstone, which is the remains of wind-borne sand dunes deposited approximately 200 million years ago in the Late Triassic.
a second Cedar Mountain (Utah) peak		2,151 metres (7,057 ft)	427 metres (1,401 ft)	
North Horn Mountain		2,783 metres (9,131 ft)	423 metres (1,388 ft)	
Mexican Mountain		1,944 metres (6,378 ft)	419 metres (1,375 ft)	
Factory Butte	38.5105081°N 111.1710451°W	2,007 metres (6,585 ft)		Factory Butte is number 152 out of 294 ranked mountains (483 peaks) on list of highest Emery County peaks. It is a 6,585 feet (2,007 m) summit, about 23 miles (37 km) west-northwest of Hanksville and about 4 miles (6.4 km) east of Capitol Reef National Park boundary, just north of the Emery–Wayne county line. Note, the synonymous Factory Butte in Wayne County, Utah, a popular off-roading area and the center of the Factory Butte Recreation Area, about 12 miles (19 km) northwest of Hanksville and about 14 miles (23 km) east of Capitol Reef National Park boundary, lies a mere 15 miles (24 km) to the east-southeast of the Emery County one. It is probably better known but is in fact at a lower elevation, 6,302 feet (1,921 m). It is located at 38°26′13″N 110°54′48″W in northern Wayne County, Utah.

== See also ==
- List of mountain peaks of Utah (top 50 peaks in Utah by elevation, by prominence, and by topographic isolation)
- List of mountain ranges of Utah
- List of mountains in the United States
