= Harkers Canyon (Salt Lake County, Utah) =

Canyon in Utah, United States

Coordinates: 40°39′55″N 112°05′19″W

Harkers Canyon is located 20 km (12 mi) west-southwest of downtown Salt Lake City, in Salt Lake County, Utah, US. The canyon empties into the Salt Lake Valley from its origin in the Oquirrh Mountains. The canyon is oriented primarily from southwest to northeast, with the middle third of the canyon descending from west to east. Harkers Canyon and surrounding land are owned and managed by the Kennecott Utah Copper Corporation and has been mined for copper.

== History ==
Although most extraction occurred in Bingham Canyon to the south, Harkers Canyon has been the site of copper mining by the Kennecott Utah Copper Corporation. Public access to the canyon may be improved by the creation of the Bonneville Shoreline Trail, a portion of which is planned to cross Harkers Canyon.

== Geography ==
Harkers Canyon is about 12.0 km (7.5 mi) long. The upper end of the canyon is at 2550 m (8360 ft) elevation just below Nelson Peak, at the boundary between Salt Lake County and Tooele County, which generally follows the watershed divide between the Salt Lake Valley and Rush Valley. Near the top of the canyon is a natural spring, Crystal Spring, at 2365 m (7760 ft) elevation. The transmission tower for broadcast radio station KDYL 1060 AM is located near the top of the canyon, on a ridge between Harkers Canyon and Barneys Canyon, at 2580 m (8465 ft) elevation.

The canyon empties out of the Oquirrh Mountains at 1490 m (4890 ft), near the unincorporated community of Bacchus and State Route 111, on the far western edge of the greater Salt Lake City metropolitan area. Harkers Canyon is located in the Utah Division of Wildlife Resources Wildlife Management Unit 18.
