= Lowe Peak (Utah) =

Mountain in Utah, United States

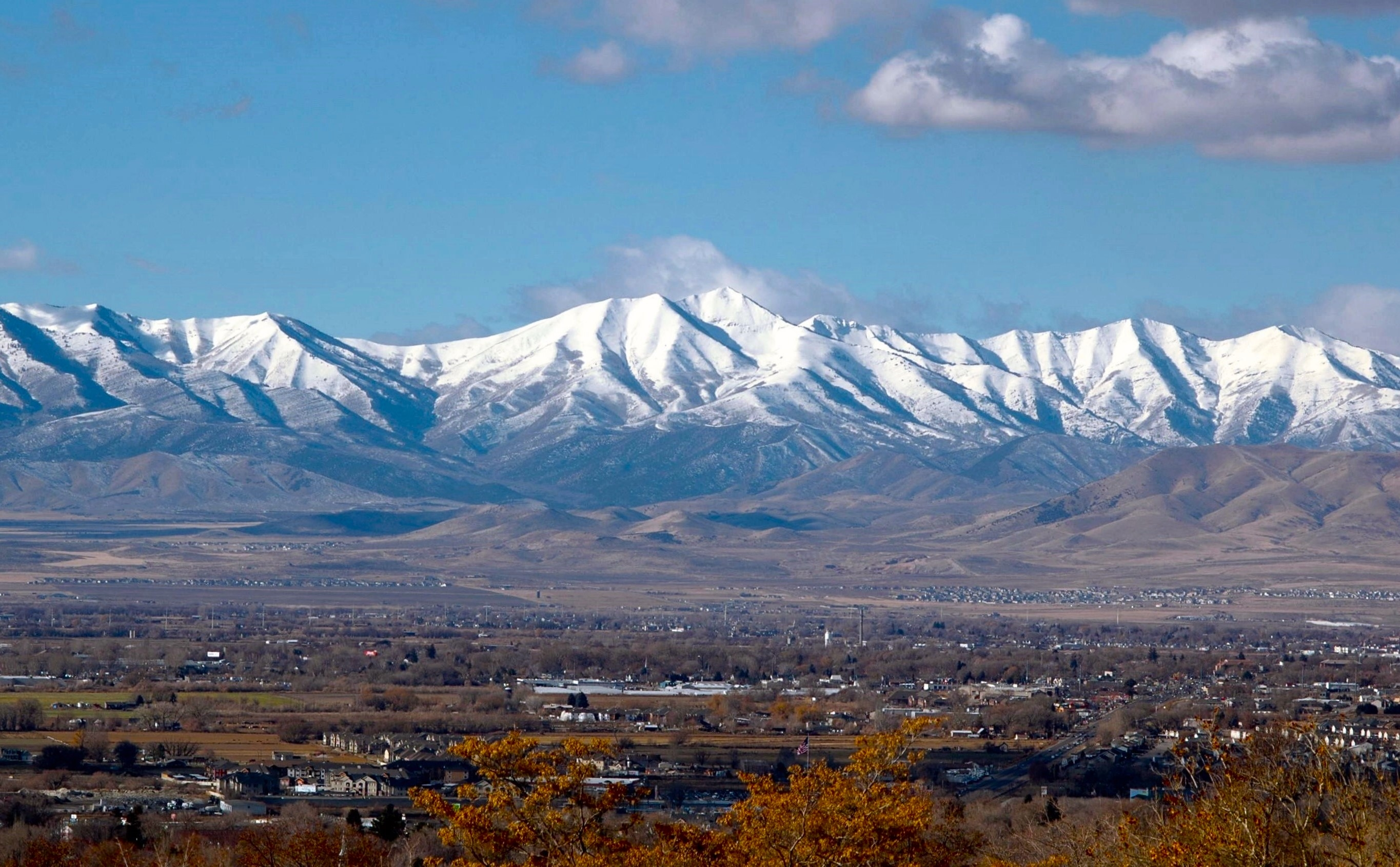
- East aspect, centered on skyline

Highest point
- Elevation: 10,589 ft (3,228 m)
- Prominence: 1,369 ft (417 m)
- Parent peak: Flat Top Mountain
- Isolation: 3.71 mi (5.97 km)
- Coordinates: 40°25′32″N 112°11′56″W

Geography
- Location within Utah Location within the United States
- Country: United States
- State: Utah
- County: Tooele / Utah
- Parent range: Oquirrh Mountains; Great Basin Ranges
- Topo map: USGS Lowe Peak

Geology
- Rock age: Pennsylvanian
- Mountain type: Fault block
- Rock type(s): Limestone, Oquirrh Formation

Climbing
- Easiest route: class 2 hiking

Lowe Peak is a 10,589-foot-elevation (3,228-meter) mountain summit located on the common boundary that Tooele County shares with Utah County in Utah, United States.

== Description ==
Lowe Peak is located 27 miles (43 km) southwest of downtown Salt Lake City and 20 miles (32 km) west of Lehi in the Oquirrh Mountains which are part of the Great Basin Ranges. It ranks as the second-highest summit in the Oquirrh Mountains, and sixth-highest in Tooele County. Precipitation runoff from the mountain's west slope drains to Rush Valley via Ophir Creek, whereas the east slope drains to Utah Lake via West Canyon Wash. Topographic relief is significant as the summit rises 3,800 feet (1,158 meters) above Left Fork West Canyon in two miles (3.2 km). In 1988, two people perished when their small plane crashed at 9,700 feet on the west face of the peak. This mountain's toponym has been officially adopted by the United States Board on Geographic Names.

== Climate ==
Lowe Peak is set within the Great Basin Desert which has hot summers and cold winters. The desert is an example of a cold desert climate as the desert's elevation makes temperatures cooler than lower elevation deserts. Due to the high elevation and aridity, temperatures drop sharply after sunset. Summer nights are comfortably cool. Winter highs are generally above freezing, and winter nights are bitterly cold, with temperatures often dropping well below freezing.

== See also ==
- List of mountains in Utah
- Great Basin

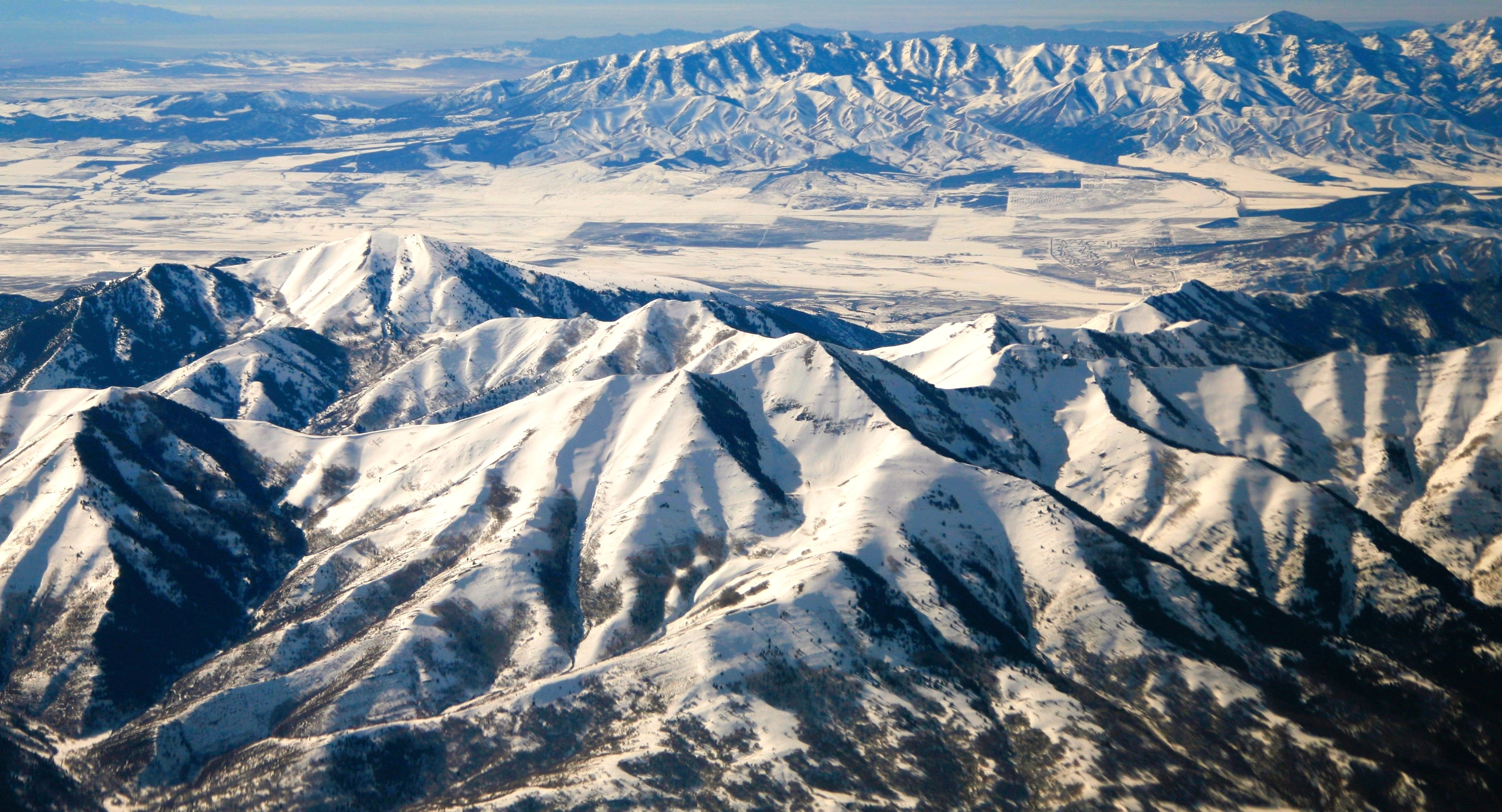
Aerial view of the east side of Lowe Peak, centered.
