= Mount Tuscarora (Utah) =

Mountain in Utah, United States

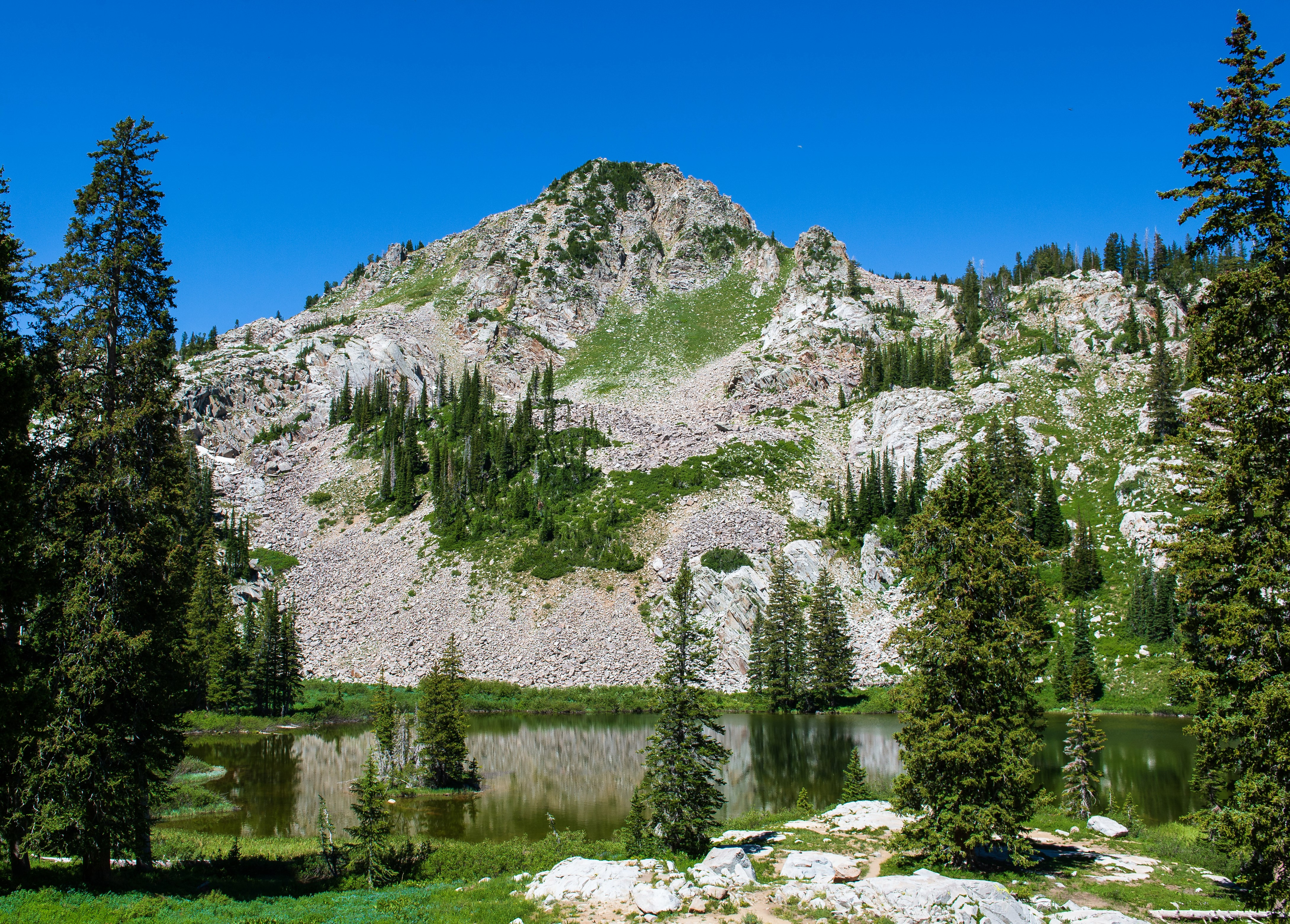
- East aspect above Lake Martha

Highest point
- Elevation: 10,646 ft (3,245 m)
- Prominence: 85 ft (26 m)
- Parent peak: Mount Wolverine
- Isolation: 0.25 mi (0.40 km)
- Coordinates: 40°35′03″N 111°35′56″W

Naming
- Etymology: Tuscarora

Geography
- Location within Utah Location within the United States
- Country: United States
- State: Utah
- County: Salt Lake
- Parent range: Wasatch Range; Rocky Mountains
- Topo map: USGS Brighton

Geology
- Rock age: 33 Ma
- Rock type: Igneous intrusive rock

Climbing
- Easiest route: class 2 hiking

Mount Tuscarora is a 10,646-foot-elevation (3,245-meter) summit in Salt Lake County, Utah, United States.

== Description ==
Mount Tuscarora is located 20 miles (32 km) southeast of downtown Salt Lake City between the Alta Ski Area and the Brighton Ski Resort in the Wasatch–Cache National Forest. The peak is set in the Wasatch Range which is a subset of the Rocky Mountains. Precipitation runoff from the mountain's north slope drains into headwaters of Big Cottonwood Creek, whereas the south slope drains into headwaters of Little Cottonwood Creek. Topographic relief is significant as the summit rises 1,100 feet (335 meters) above Lake Mary in one-half mile (0.8 km). Mount Tuscarora is composed of granodiorite of the igneous Alta stock. This mountain's toponym has been officially adopted by the United States Board on Geographic Names. Tuscarora was the chief of the Tuscarora people on the East Coast, but why the name was applied to this peak is not apparent.

== Climate ==
Mount Tuscarora has a subarctic climate (Köppen Dfc), bordering on an Alpine climate (Köppen ET), with long, cold, snowy winters, and cool to warm summers. Due to its altitude, it receives precipitation all year, as snow in winter, and as thunderstorms in summer.

== Gallery ==
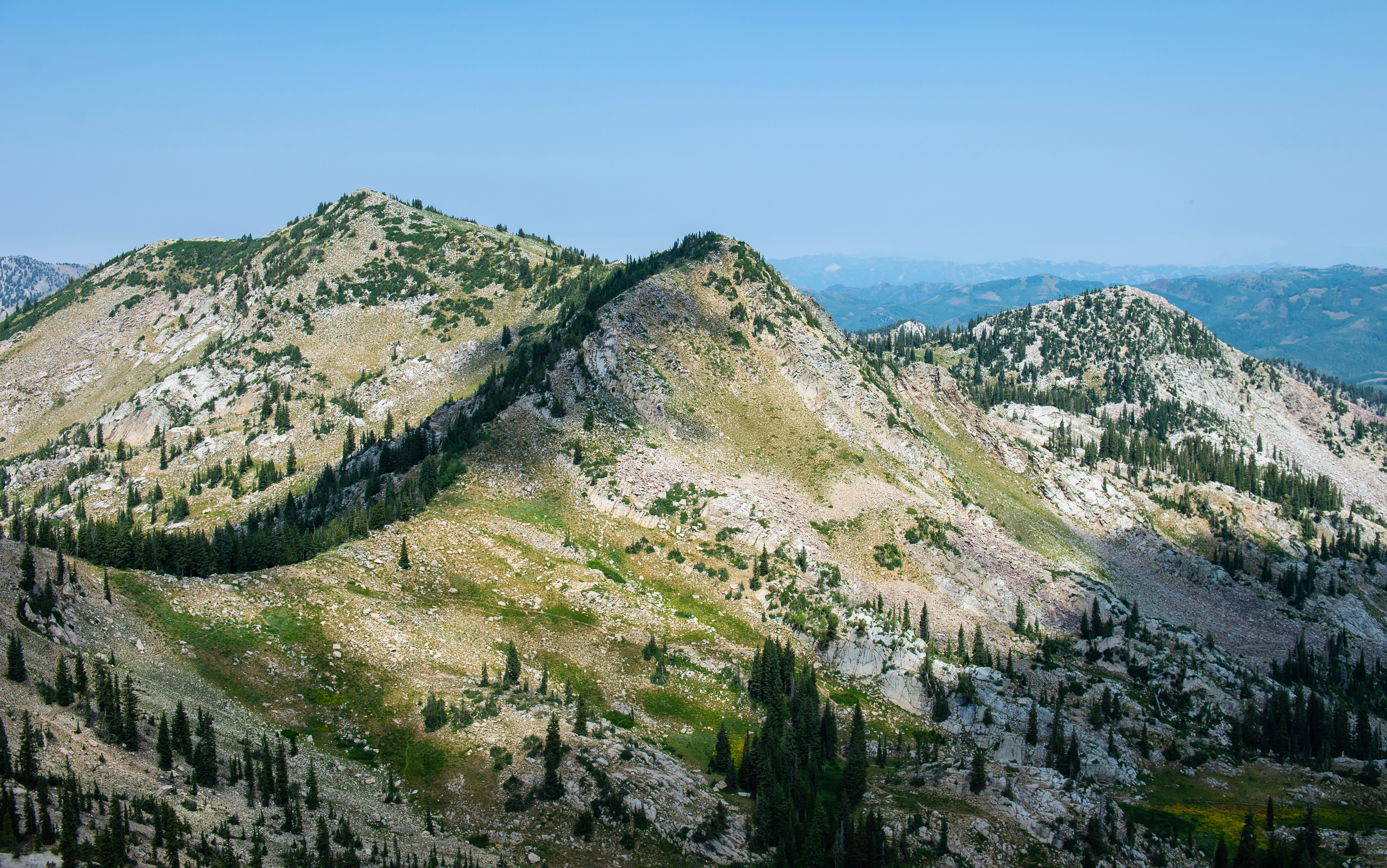
View from Sunset Peak with Mount Wolverine (left), Mount Tuscarora (center), and Mount Millicent (right).

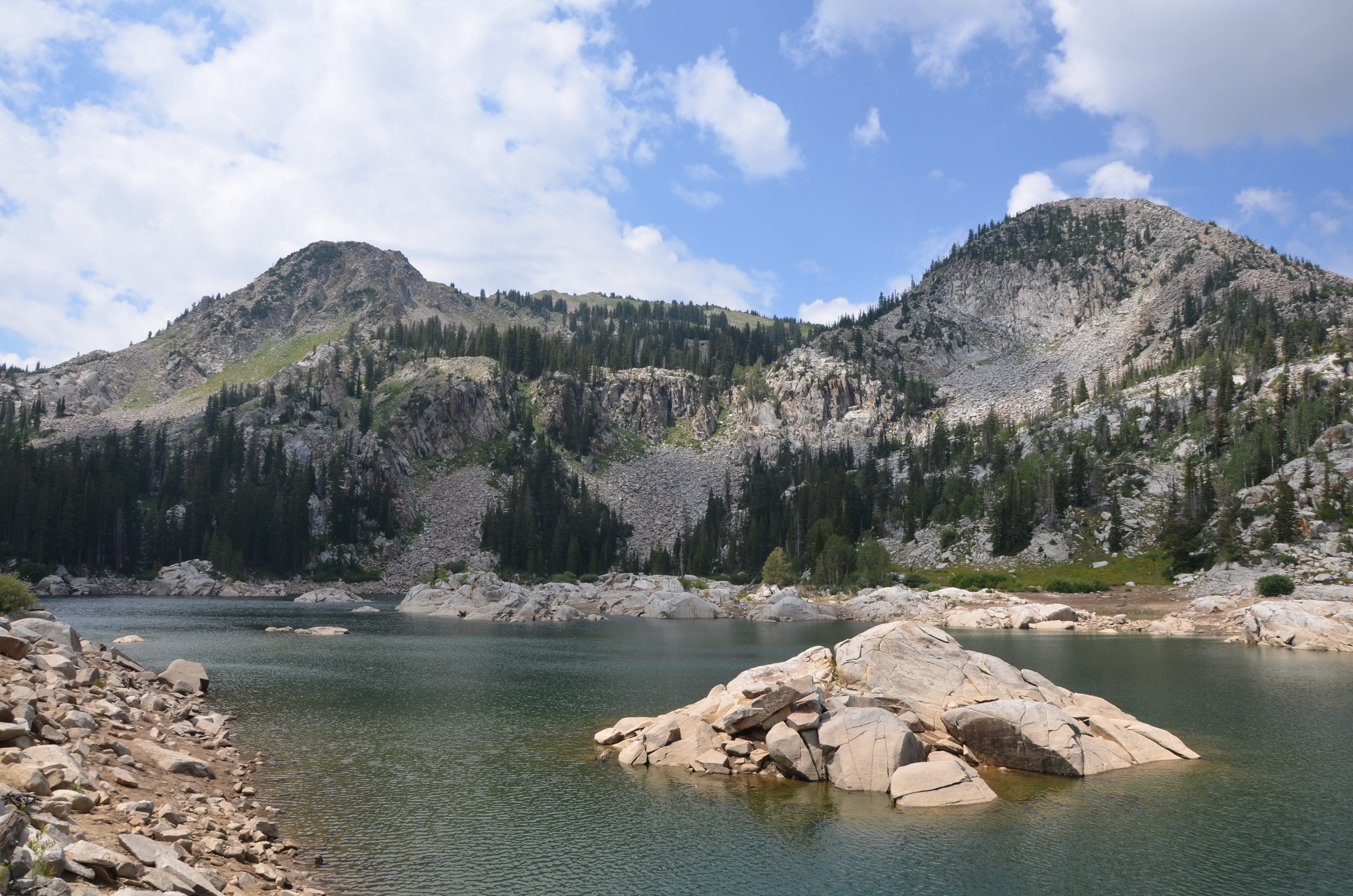
Mount Tuscarora (left) and Mount Millicent (right) from Lake Mary
