= Bacchus, Utah =

Coordinates: 40.663°N 112.094°W

Bacchus is a ghost town in Salt Lake County, Utah, United States.

== Description ==
The former community was located on State Route 111 in the western edge of the Salt Lake Valley, near the Oquirrh Mountains. It was established in 1915 when the Hercules Powder Company opened an explosives plant in the town. With improved transportation, the workers moved to more favorable locations, and the town deteriorated into a ghost town between 1930 and 1960. The area is now owned by Northrop Grumman (formerly ATK Aerospace).

== See also ==
- List of ghost towns in Utah
