= Cathedral Mountain (Capitol Reef National Park) =

Summit in the American state of Utah

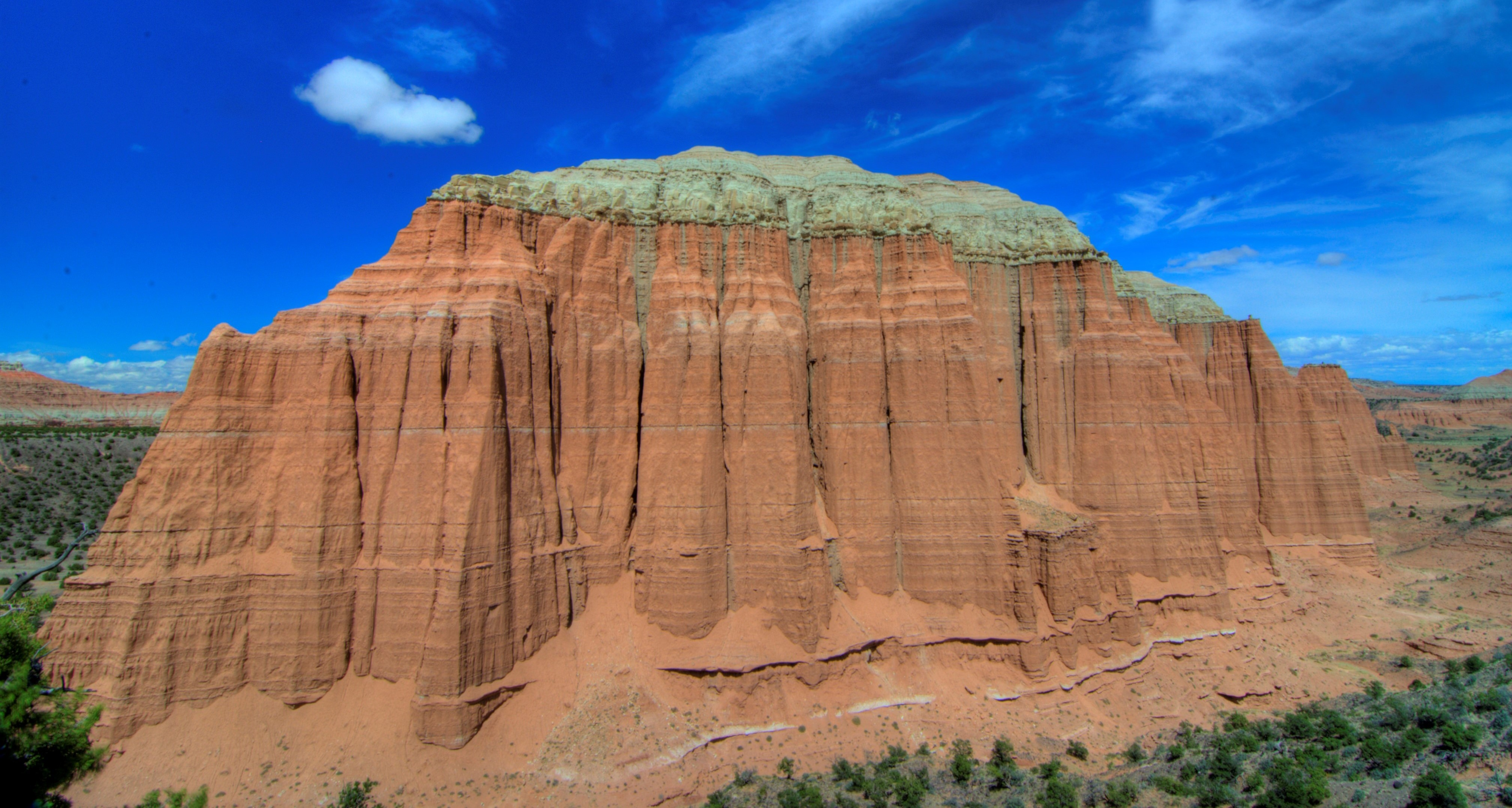
- Southwest aspect, May 2013

Highest point
- Elevation: 6,924 ft (2,110 m)
- Prominence: 384 ft (117 m)
- Parent peak: Point 6984
- Isolation: 1.89 mi (3.04 km)
- Coordinates: 38°29′35″N 111°22′01″W

Geography
- Location within Utah Location within the United States
- Country: United States
- State: Utah
- County: Wayne
- Protected area: Capitol Reef National Park
- Parent range: Colorado Plateau
- Topo map: USGS Cathedral Mountain

Geology
- Rock age: Jurassic
- Rock type: Entrada Sandstone

Climbing
- Easiest route: class 5.x climbing

Cathedral Mountain is a 6,924-foot (2,110 m) summit located in Capitol Reef National Park, in Wayne County of Utah, United States.

== Description ==
This remote erosional remnant is situated 13 miles (21 km) north-northwest of the park's visitor center, and 0.6 miles (0.97 km) west of Needle Mountain, in the Middle Desert of the park's North (Cathedral Valley) District. Cathedral Valley was so named in 1945 by Charles Kelly, first superintendent of Capitol Reef National Monument, because the valley's sandstone monoliths reminded early explorers of ornate, Gothic cathedrals, with fluted walls, alcoves, and pinnacles. The free-standing Cathedral Mountain towers over 500 feet (150 meters) above the valley floor, which is within the Fremont River drainage basin. John C. Frémont's 1853 expedition passed through Cathedral Valley.

== Geology ==
Cathedral Mountain is composed of reddish Entrada Sandstone with a hard, grayish-green sandstone and siltstone Curtis Formation layer caprock which protects it from erosion. The sandstone, which was originally deposited as sandy mud on a tidal flat, is believed to have formed about 160 million years ago during the Jurassic period as a giant sand sea, the largest in Earth's history. Stratum in Cathedral Valley have a gentle inclination of three to five degrees to the east, and appear nearly horizontal. Long after these sedimentary rocks were deposited, the Colorado Plateau was uplifted relatively evenly, keeping the layers roughly horizontal, but Capitol Reef is an exception because of the Waterpocket Fold, a classic monocline, which formed between 50 and 70 million years ago during the Laramide Orogeny.

== Climate ==
Spring and fall are the most favorable seasons to visit Cathedral Mountain. According to the Köppen climate classification system, it is located in a Cold semi-arid climate zone, which is defined by the coldest month having an average mean temperature below 32 °F (0 °C), and at least 50% of the total annual precipitation being received during the spring and summer. This desert climate receives less than 10 inches (250 millimeters) of annual rainfall, and snowfall is generally light during the winter.

Climate data for Capitol Reef Visitor Center, elevation 5,653 ft (1,723 m), 1981-2010 normals, extremes 1981-2019
Month	Jan	Feb	Mar	Apr	May	Jun	Jul	Aug	Sep	Oct	Nov	Dec	Year
Record high °F (°C)	58.6 (14.8)	68.3 (20.2)	78.3 (25.7)	84.4 (29.1)	94.6 (34.8)	100.2 (37.9)	100.8 (38.2)	97.9 (36.6)	95.4 (35.2)	86.1 (30.1)	70.4 (21.3)	61.5 (16.4)	100.8 (38.2)
Mean daily maximum °F (°C)	40.6 (4.8)	46.4 (8.0)	54.7 (12.6)	65.0 (18.3)	74.5 (23.6)	85.3 (29.6)	90.4 (32.4)	87.9 (31.1)	80.2 (26.8)	66.1 (18.9)	51.3 (10.7)	40.6 (4.8)	65.3 (18.5)
Mean daily minimum °F (°C)	17.8 (−7.9)	22.7 (−5.2)	30.2 (−1.0)	36.2 (2.3)	44.7 (7.1)	53.1 (11.7)	60.4 (15.8)	58.5 (14.7)	50.4 (10.2)	39.0 (3.9)	27.6 (−2.4)	18.2 (−7.7)	38.3 (3.5)
Record low °F (°C)	−4.2 (−20.1)	−11.8 (−24.3)	9.1 (−12.7)	18.1 (−7.7)	27.2 (−2.7)	34.6 (1.4)	42.4 (5.8)	45.1 (7.3)	29.9 (−1.2)	11.7 (−11.3)	8.0 (−13.3)	−7.5 (−21.9)	−11.8 (−24.3)
Average precipitation inches (mm)	0.52 (13)	0.34 (8.6)	0.53 (13)	0.47 (12)	0.59 (15)	0.47 (12)	0.91 (23)	1.20 (30)	0.80 (20)	0.98 (25)	0.49 (12)	0.32 (8.1)	7.62 (194)
Average dew point °F (°C)	17.3 (−8.2)	20.8 (−6.2)	23.0 (−5.0)	24.5 (−4.2)	29.1 (−1.6)	32.0 (0.0)	40.0 (4.4)	41.8 (5.4)	34.8 (1.6)	28.2 (−2.1)	21.9 (−5.6)	17.5 (−8.1)	27.6 (−2.4)
Source: PRISM

== Gallery ==
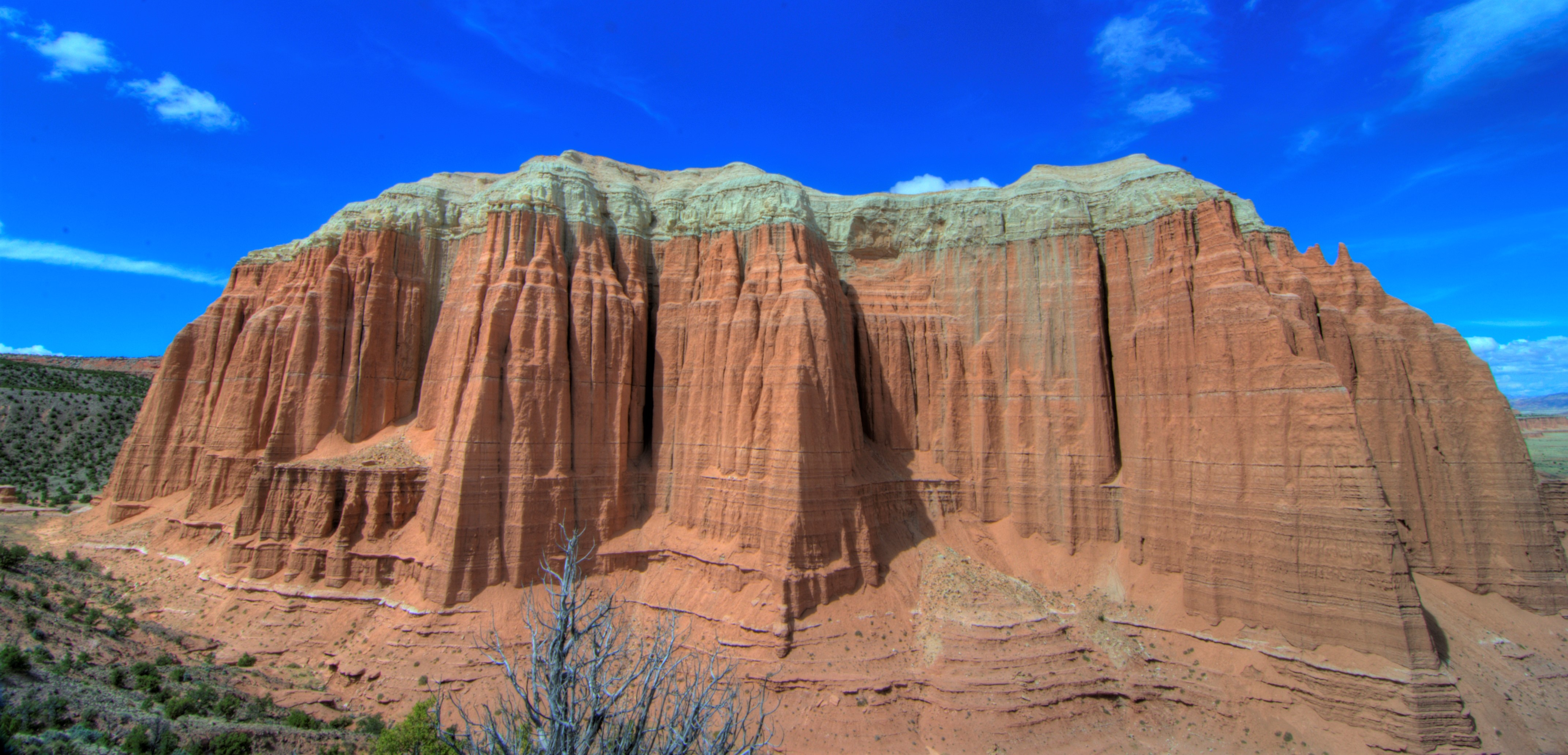
South aspect, seen from Cathedrals Trail

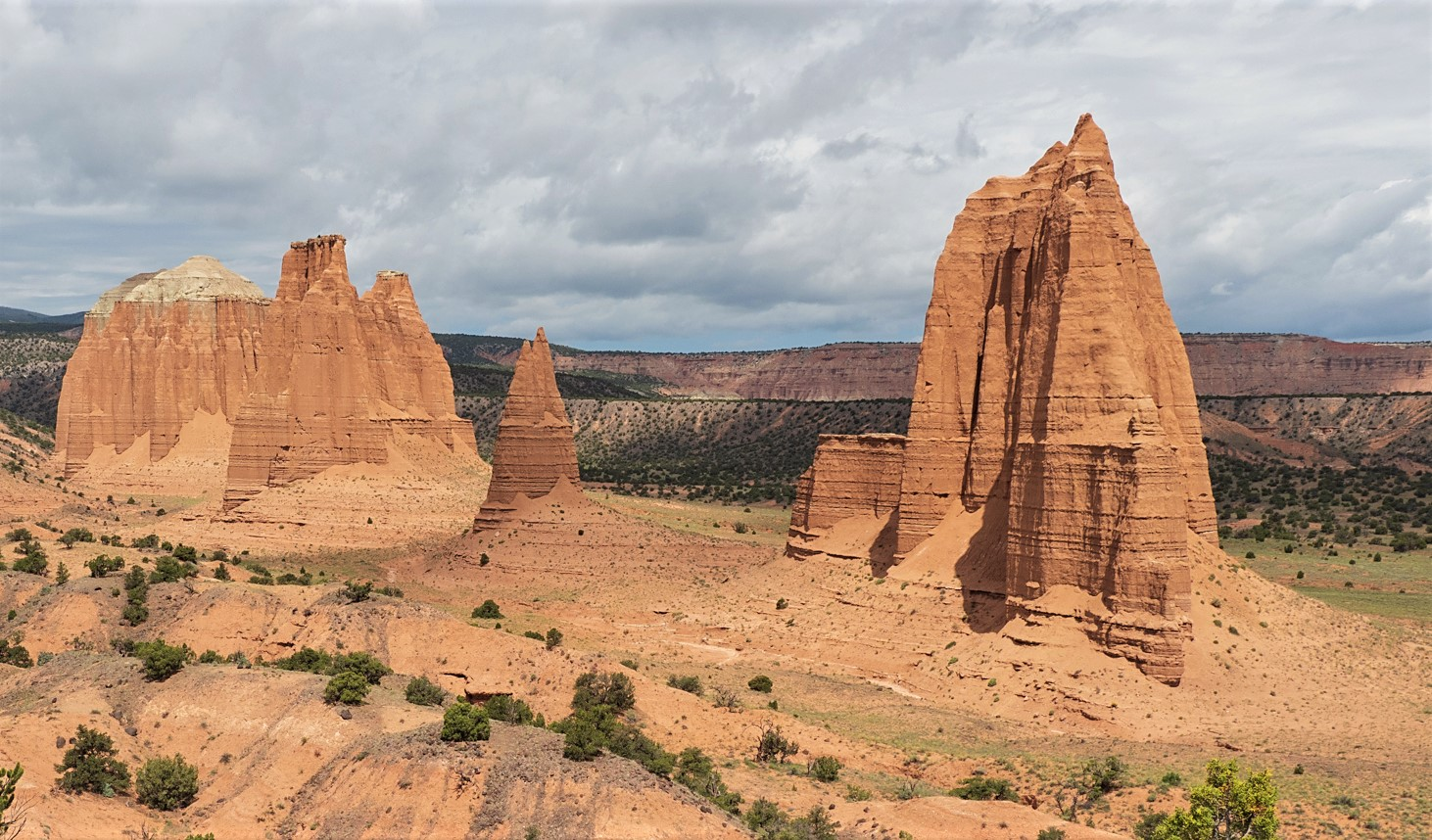
Cathedral Mountain (left), Needle Mountain (right), from the southeast

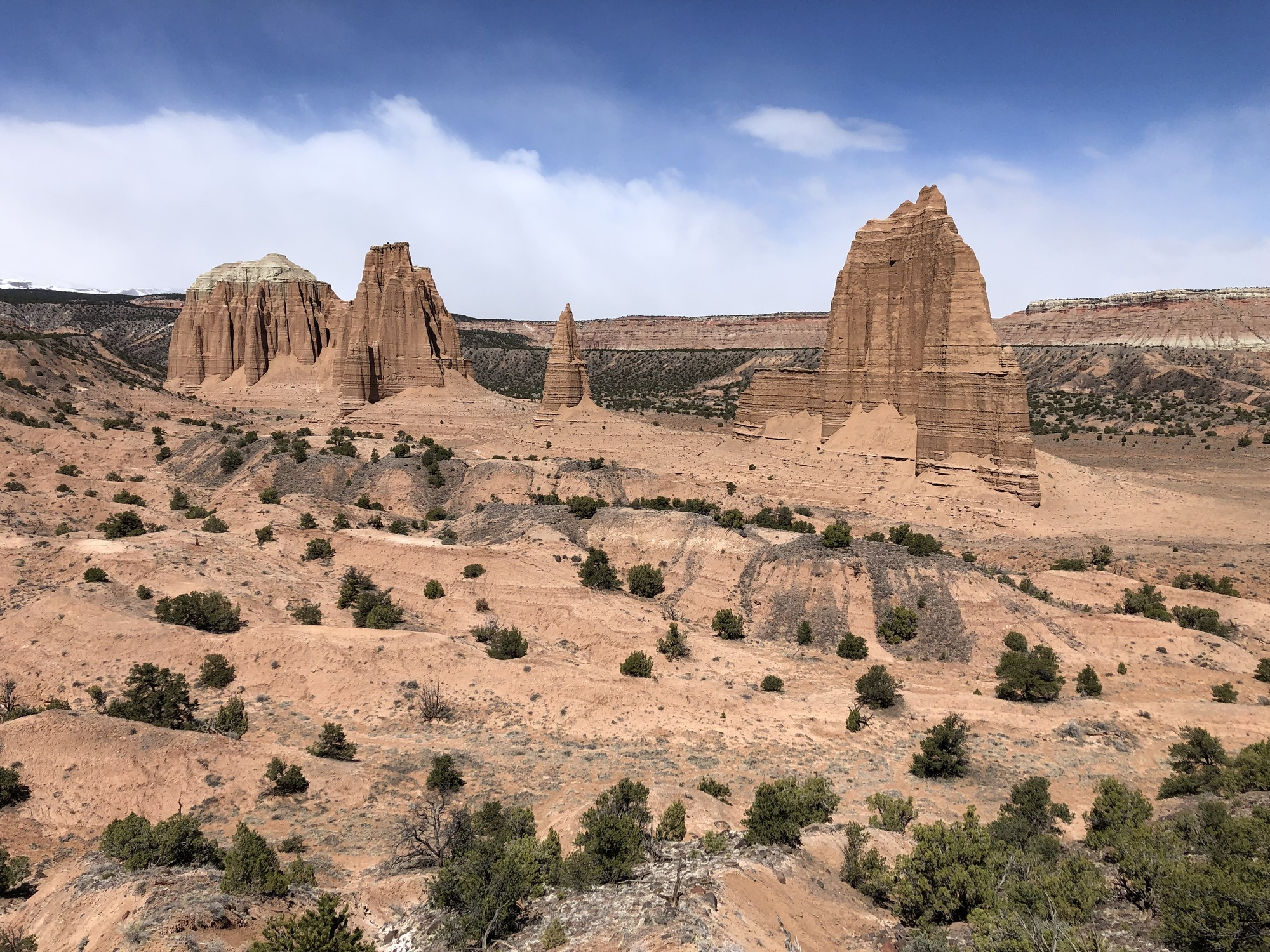
Cathedral Mountain (left), Needle Mountain (right)

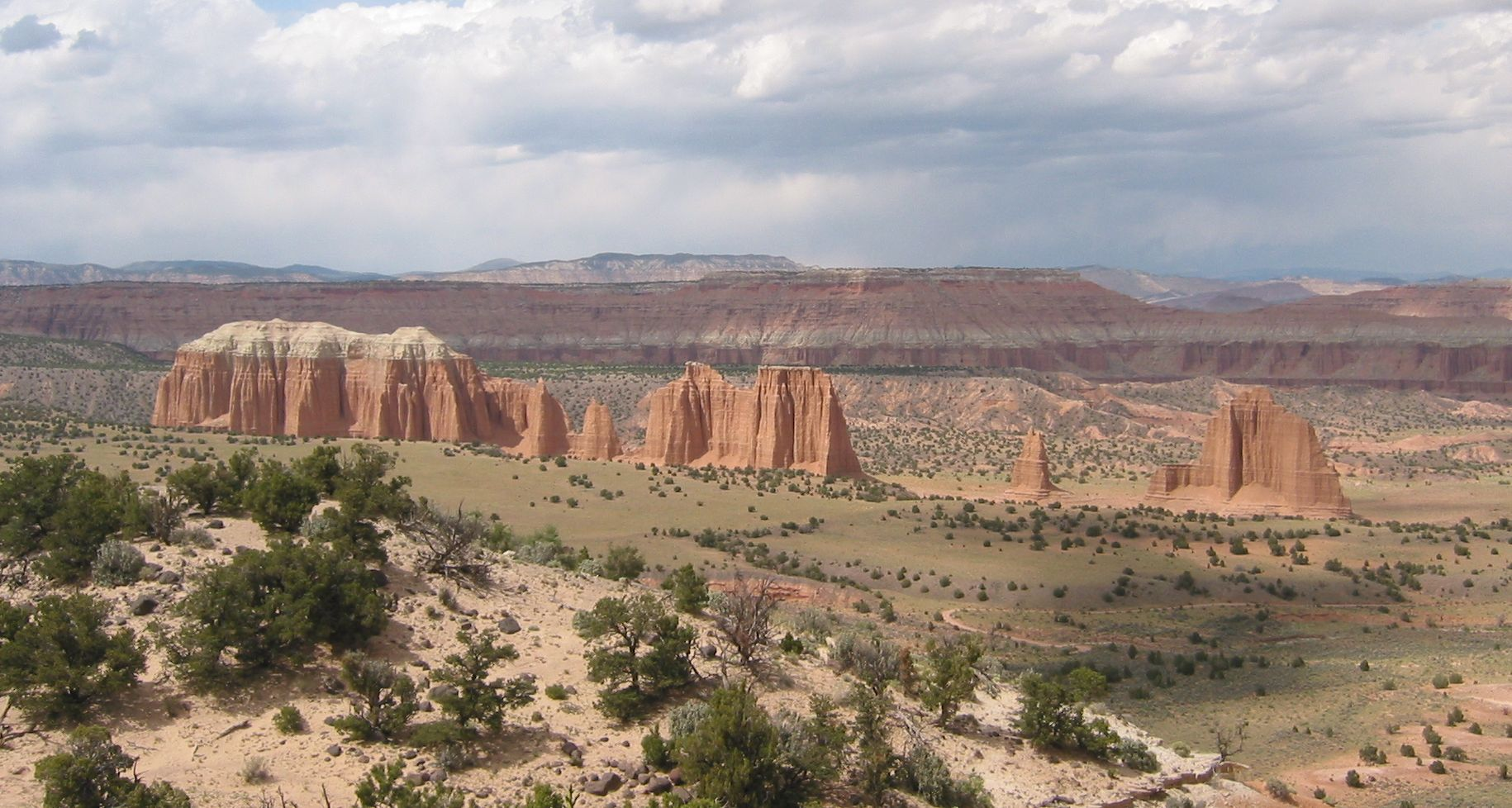
"The Cathedrals" with Cathedral Mountain to left

Cathedral Valley sunset, with Cathedral Mountain to left

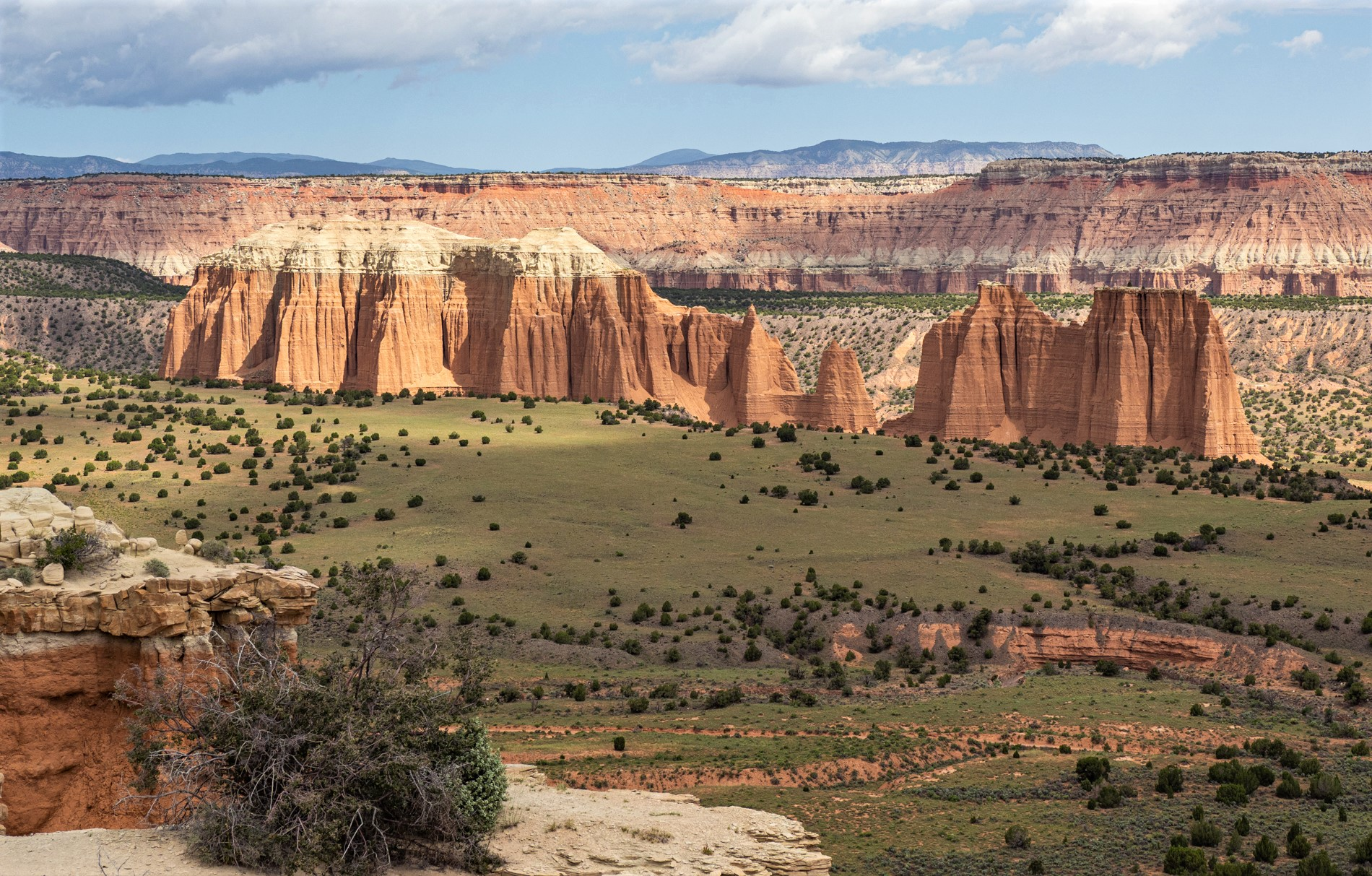
Cathedral Mountain from Upper Cathedral Valley Overlook

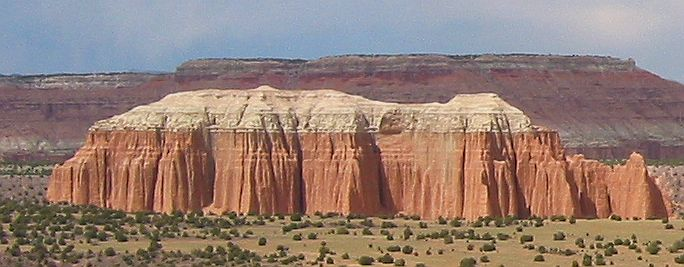

== See also ==
- List of mountains of Utah
- Geology of the Capitol Reef area
