= Cascade Mountain (Utah) =

Mountain in the American state of Utah

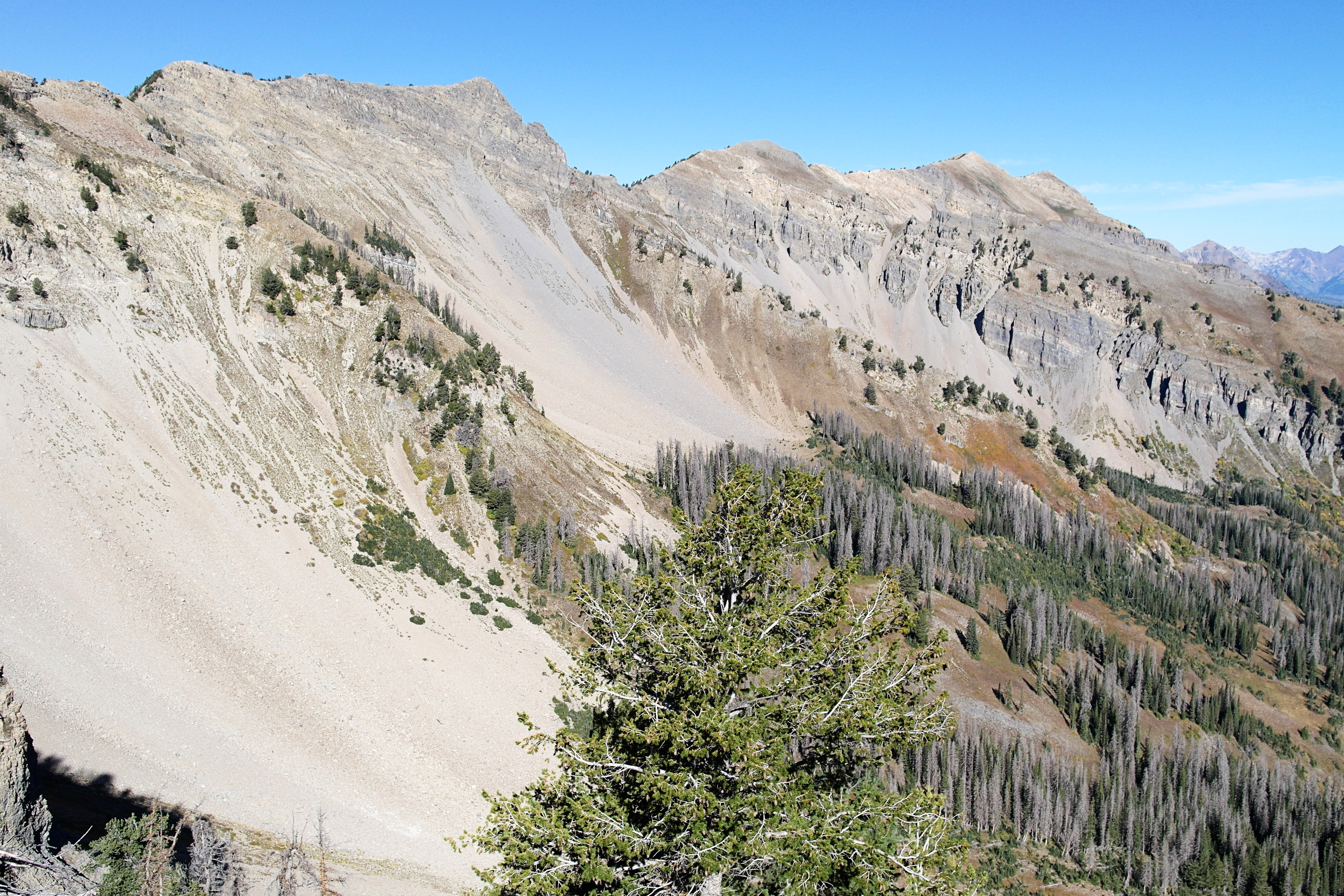
- Cascade Mountain in 2015

Highest point
- Elevation: 10,908 ft (3,325 m)
- Coordinates: 40°18′25.2″N 111°35′16.8″W

Geography
- Location within Utah
- Parent range: Wasatch Range

Cascade Mountain is located in central Utah (Utah County just east of Provo and Orem Utah). With an elevation of 10,908 feet (3,325 m), it is not as high as its neighbors, to the north Mount Timpanogos (11,752 feet [3,582 m]) and Provo Peak (11,068 feet [3,374 m]) to the south, but it is one of the major peaks of the Wasatch Range.

== Hiking ==
There are several access routes to the summit. The safest and easiest routes are either from the Dry Fork trail that starts at the Rock Canyon Campground to the southwest of the mountain or the Big Springs trails from the east. There are many other routes from Bridal Veil Falls or the western side of the mountain but they are much more difficult.

== See also ==
- List of mountains in Utah
