= Flat Top Mountain (Utah) =

Mountain in Utah, United States

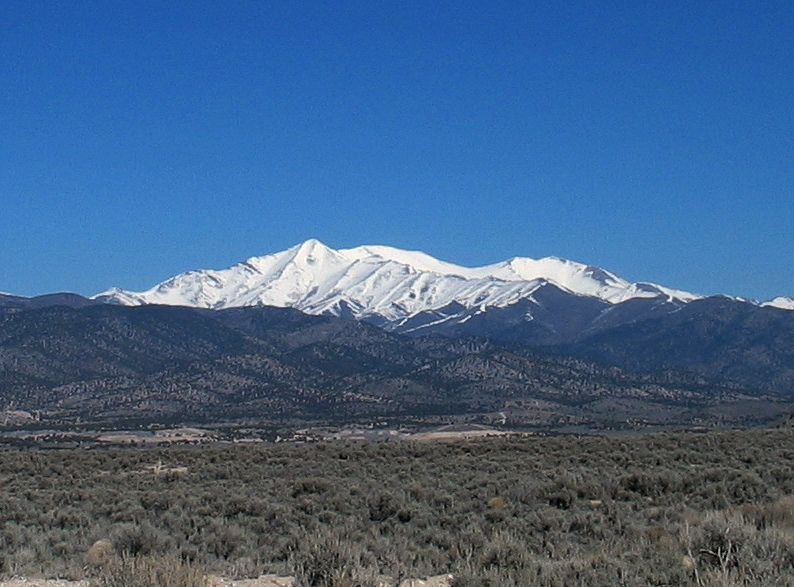
- Flat Top Mountain - Looking north from near Five Mile pass

Highest point
- Elevation: 10,613 ft (3,235 m)
- Prominence: 5,370 ft (1,640 m)
- Parent peak: Deseret Peak
- Isolation: 23.6 mi (38.0 km)
- Coordinates: 40°22′21″N 112°11′21″W

Geography
- Location within Utah
- Location: Utah and Tooele Counties, Utah
- Parent range: Oquirrh Mountains

Flat Top Mountain is a 10,624-foot (3,238 m) peak in Utah and Tooele Counties, Utah in the United States, about 15 miles (24 km) to the east of Rush Valley.

With a prominence of approximately 5,370-foot (1,640 m), it is the sixth most prominent peak in Utah. It is the highest point of the Oquirrh Mountains.

Flat Top Mountain overlooks Lehi, American Fork and the entire northern Utah county area. It can be seen everywhere in the greater Salt Lake Basin area.

== Climate ==
Climate data for Flat Top Mountain (UT) 40.4245 N, 112.1993 W, Elevation: 10,095 ft (3,077 m) (1991–2020 normals)
Month	Jan	Feb	Mar	Apr	May	Jun	Jul	Aug	Sep	Oct	Nov	Dec	Year
Mean daily maximum °F (°C)	28.3 (−2.1)	29.2 (−1.6)	34.4 (1.3)	40.4 (4.7)	50.0 (10.0)	62.4 (16.9)	71.7 (22.1)	70.0 (21.1)	60.6 (15.9)	47.6 (8.7)	34.9 (1.6)	27.8 (−2.3)	46.4 (8.0)
Daily mean °F (°C)	20.0 (−6.7)	20.0 (−6.7)	24.6 (−4.1)	29.6 (−1.3)	38.8 (3.8)	49.7 (9.8)	58.7 (14.8)	57.9 (14.4)	49.1 (9.5)	37.4 (3.0)	26.4 (−3.1)	19.7 (−6.8)	36.0 (2.2)
Mean daily minimum °F (°C)	11.7 (−11.3)	10.8 (−11.8)	14.8 (−9.6)	18.8 (−7.3)	27.5 (−2.5)	37.1 (2.8)	45.8 (7.7)	45.8 (7.7)	37.6 (3.1)	27.2 (−2.7)	17.9 (−7.8)	11.6 (−11.3)	25.6 (−3.6)
Average precipitation inches (mm)	4.52 (115)	4.51 (115)	5.15 (131)	5.41 (137)	3.95 (100)	1.81 (46)	1.29 (33)	1.41 (36)	2.09 (53)	3.21 (82)	3.75 (95)	4.38 (111)	41.48 (1,054)
Source: PRISM Climate Group

== See also ==
- List of mountain peaks of Utah
- List of Ultras of the United States
