= Nelson Peak (Utah) =

Mountain in Utah, United States

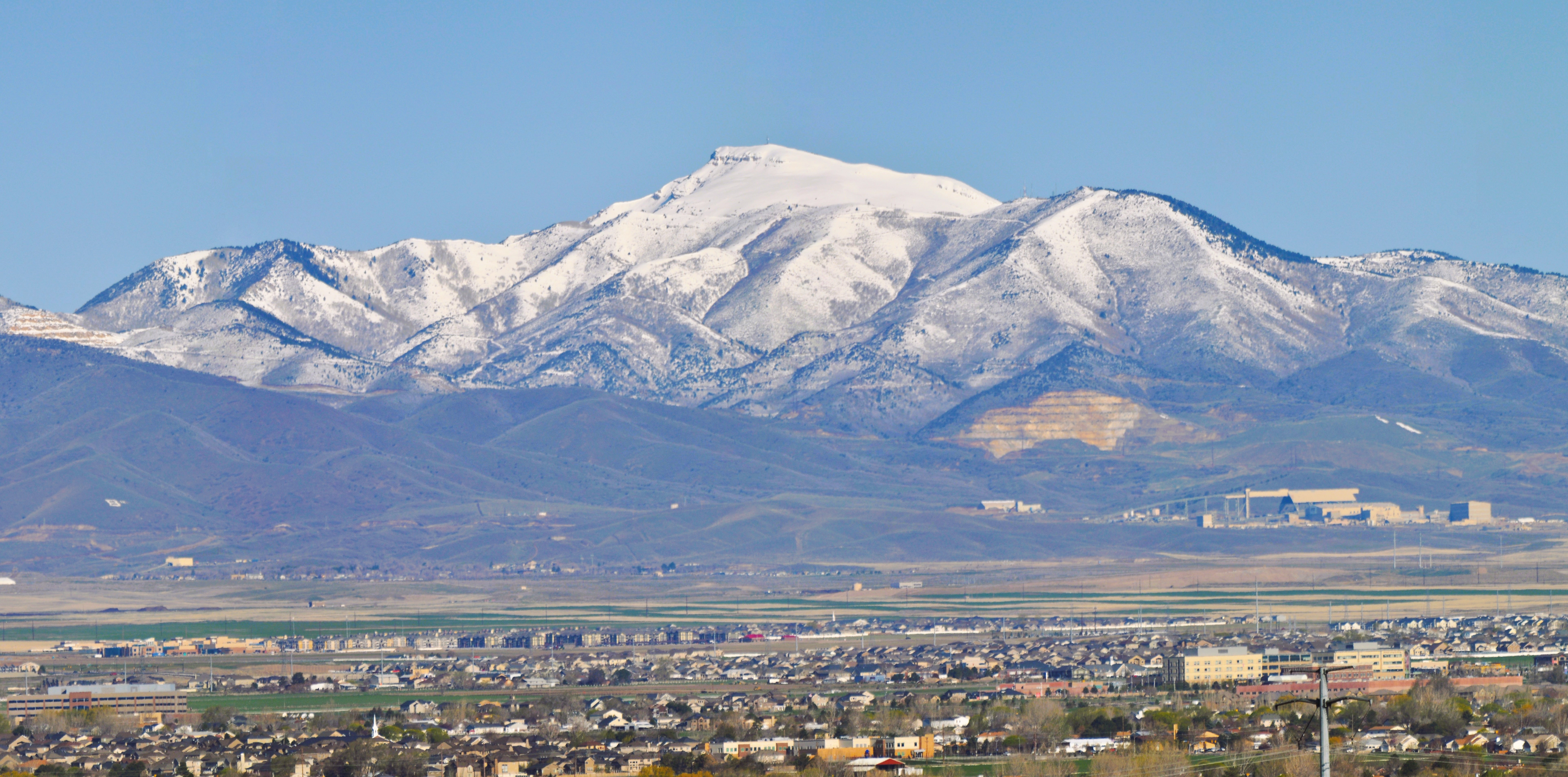
- Southeast aspect

Highest point
- Elevation: 9,359 ft (2,853 m)
- Prominence: 1,699 ft (518 m)
- Parent peak: Butterfield Peaks
- Isolation: 10.18 mi (16.38 km)
- Coordinates: 40°36′49″N 112°11′15″W

Geography
- Location within Utah Location within the United States
- Country: United States
- State: Utah
- County: Tooele / Salt Lake
- Parent range: Oquirrh Mountains; Great Basin Ranges
- Topo map: USGS Bingham Canyon

Geology
- Mountain type: Fault block
- Rock type: Limestone

Climbing
- Easiest route: class 1 hiking

Nelson Peak is a 9,359-foot-elevation (2,853-meter) mountain summit located on the common boundary that Tooele County shares with Salt Lake County in Utah, United States.

== Description ==
Nelson Peak is located 19 miles (31 km) southwest of Salt Lake City and seven miles (11 km) northeast of Tooele in the Oquirrh Mountains which are part of the Great Basin Ranges. It is the highest point in the northern Oquirrh Mountains. Precipitation runoff from the mountain's slopes drains to the nearby Great Salt Lake. Topographic relief is significant as the summit rises 4,400 feet (1,341 meters) above Tooele Valley in 3.5 miles (5.6 km). The east side of the mountain is private land owned by Rio Tinto, so hiking access to the summit is from Bates Canyon or Flood Canyon on the west side which is public land administered by the Bureau of Land Management. This mountain's toponym has been officially adopted by the United States Board on Geographic Names.

== Climate ==
Nelson Peak is set within the Great Basin Desert which has hot summers and cold winters. The desert is an example of a cold desert climate as the desert's elevation makes temperatures cooler than lower elevation deserts. Due to the high elevation and aridity, temperatures drop sharply after sunset. Summer nights are comfortably cool. Winter highs are generally above freezing, and winter nights are bitterly cold, with temperatures often dropping well below freezing.

== See also ==
- List of mountains in Utah
- Great Basin
