= Oquirrh Mountains =

Mountain range in Utah, USA

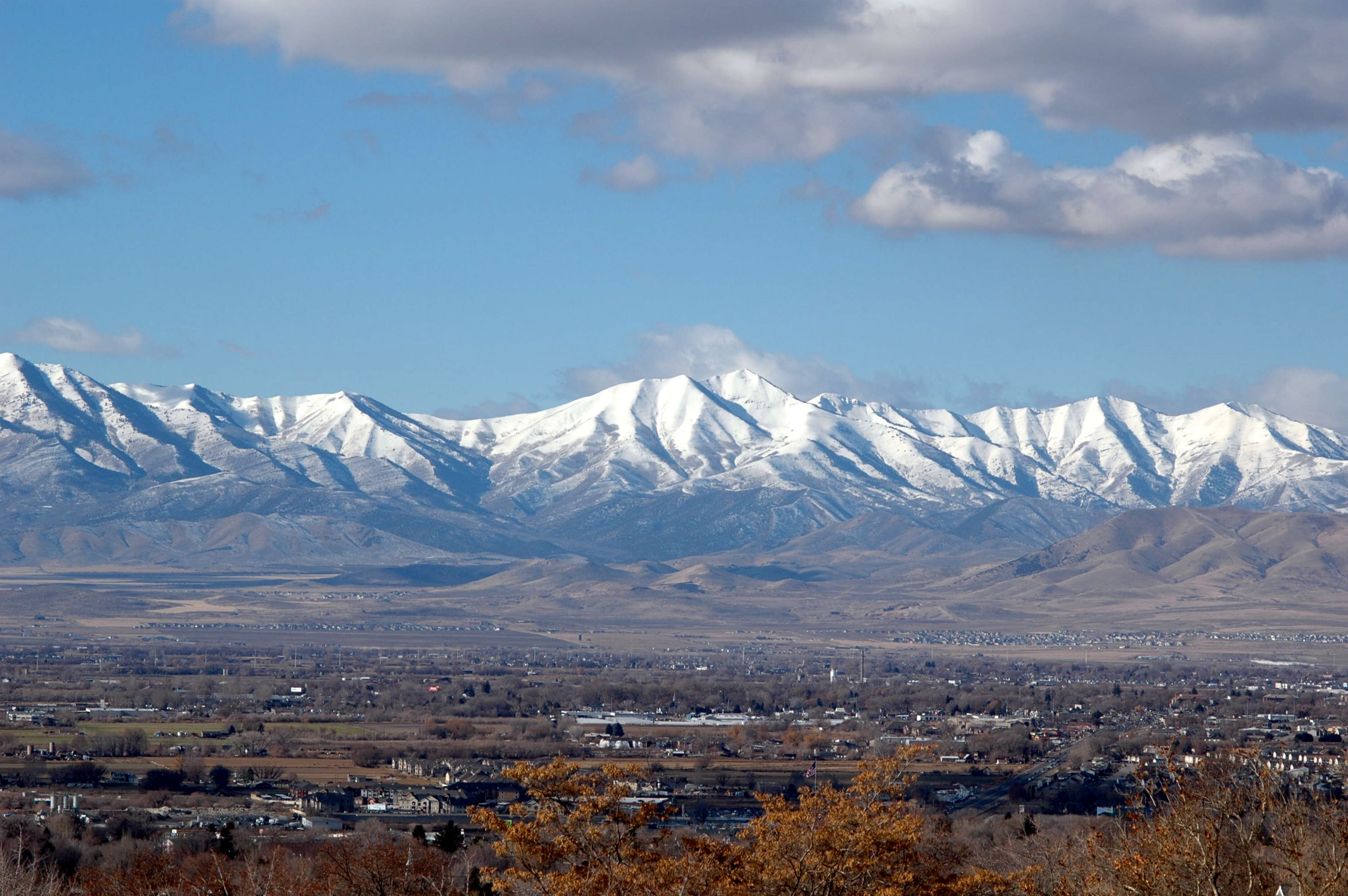
- Lowe Peak centered on the skyline

Highest point
- Peak: Flat Top Mountain
- Elevation: 10,613 ft (3,235 m)
- Coordinates: 40°22′21″N 112°11′21″W

Dimensions
- Length: 30 mi (48 km) N-S
- Width: 15 mi (24 km) E-W

Geography
- Location within Utah Location within the United States
- Country: United States
- State: Utah
- Counties: Salt Lake; Tooele; Utah
- Parent range: Great Basin
- Borders on: Great Salt Lake; Tooele Valley; Rush Valley; Salt Lake City; Cedar Valley

The Oquirrh Mountains (/ˈoʊkər/ OH-kər) is a mountain range that runs north–south for approximately 30 miles (50 km) to form the west side of Utah's Salt Lake Valley, separating it from Tooele Valley. The range runs from northwestern Utah County–central & eastern Tooele County, to the south shore of the Great Salt Lake. The highest elevation is Flat Top Mountain at 10,620 ft (3,237 m). The name Oquirrh was taken from the Goshute word meaning "wood sitting."

The Oquirrh Mountains have been mined for gold, silver, lead, and most famously for copper, as home of the porphyry copper deposit at Bingham Canyon Mine, one of the world's largest open pit mines. As seen from Salt Lake City, the view of the mountain range is dominated by the displaced rock material (known as overburden) dug from the Kennecott mine. At the north end of the range is Kennecott's smelter complex, which refines ore concentrates from the mine into useful metals. Dark-colored tailings from past metal refining at the complex can be observed from the adjacent freeway, I-80. The value of the minerals taken from the range has been estimated to far exceed the combined value of those taken in the California, Nevada, and Klondike gold and silver rushes.

In the winter months, the mountains become home to a small population of bald eagles, which can often be found in the cliffs on the west side of the range down to the reservoir near the town of Stockton.

The range has many canyons and dense forests, consisting mainly of conifers and aspen. The area is also home to thriving populations of butterflies, deer, mountain lions, and squirrels. Two of the most popular canyons are Yellow Fork Canyon and Butterfield Canyon. Yellow Fork Canyon is home to a trail administered by Salt Lake County and numerous gated communities. Butterfield Canyon contains a paved road (with the exception of a 1/4 mile portion on the Tooele side that is well-maintained dirt) that connects Tooele with Herriman. Butterfield Canyon road climbs to a summit of 9,180 ft. above sea level. At night the mouth of the canyon is a dangerous area as large herds of deer move into the farmlands for feeding.

The north end of the mountain range features a peak known as Farnsworth Peak which houses almost all Salt Lake City FM and TV station transmitters. The peak is also used for emergency communications (such as police, fire, and EMS). Several local businesses and amateur radio operators have transmitters on Farnsworth Peak.

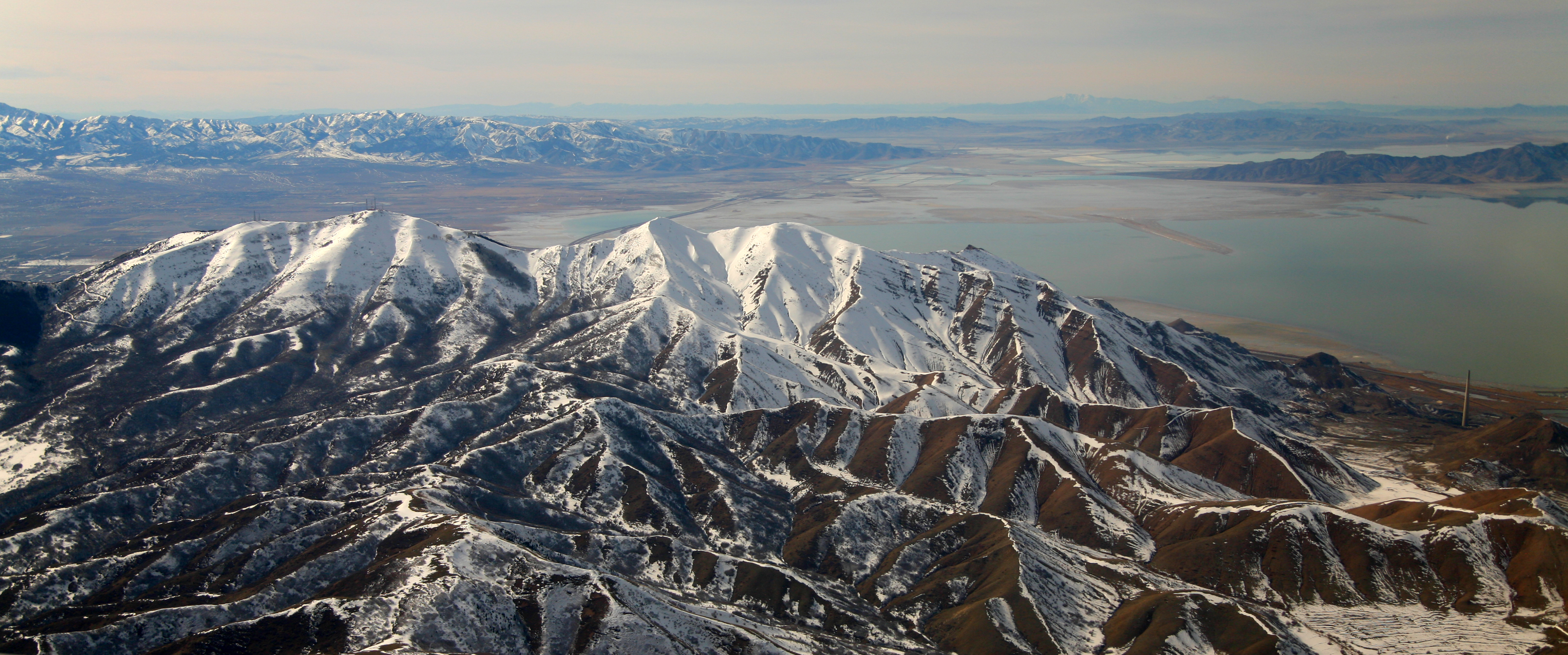
Aerial view of north end of Oquirrh Mountains near Magna, Utah and Lake Point, Utah

== See also ==
- Farnsworth Peak
- Harkers Canyon
- Knee Weakener
- Nelson Peak
- Oquirrh Mountain Utah Temple
