= Mount Wolverine =

Mountain in Utah, United States

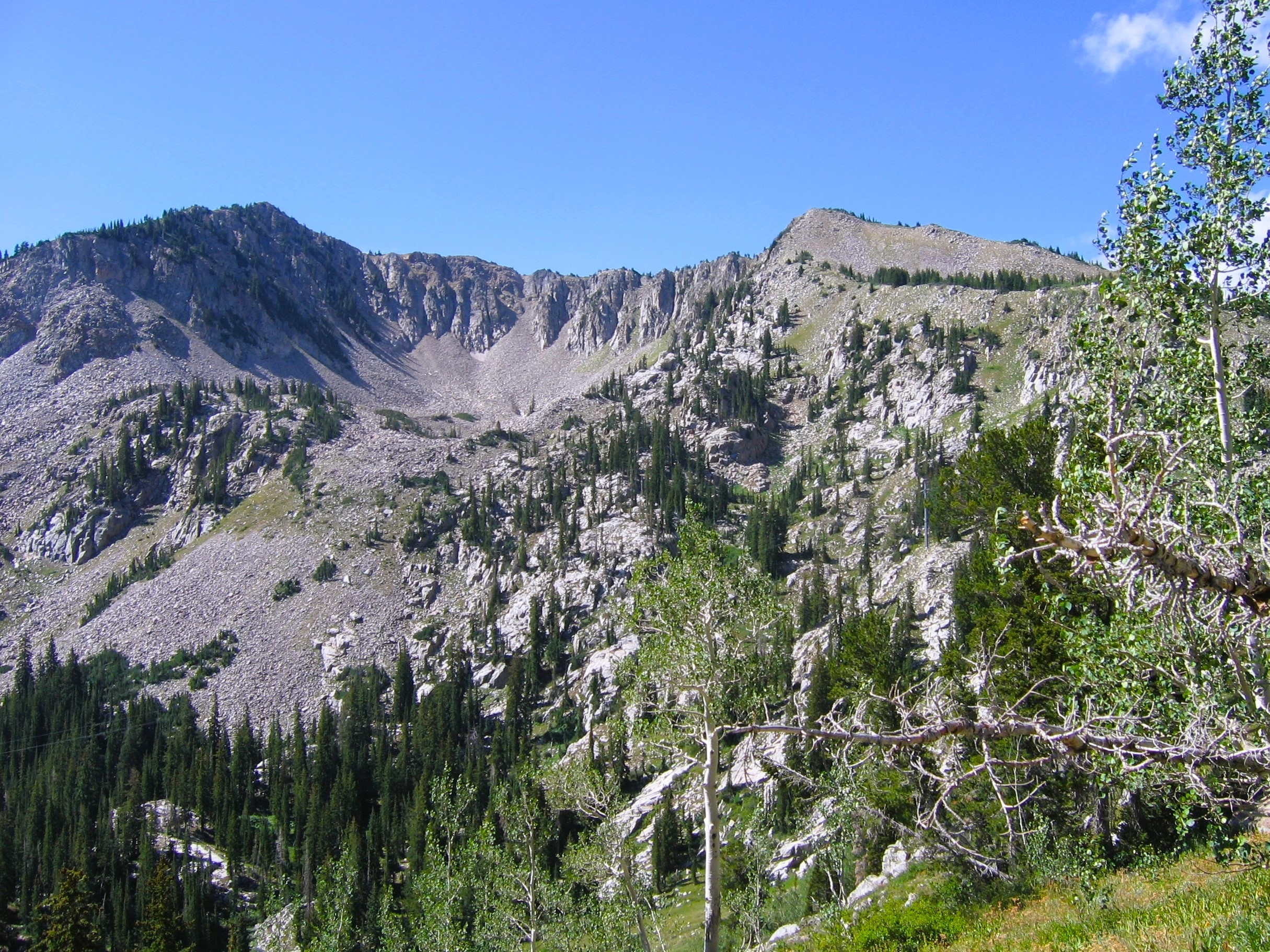
- North aspect, summit on the left

Highest point
- Elevation: 10,795 ft (3,290 m)
- Prominence: 575 ft (175 m)
- Parent peak: Sugarloaf Mountain
- Isolation: 1.76 mi (2.83 km)
- Coordinates: 40°35′07″N 111°36′12″W

Naming
- Etymology: Wolverine

Geography
- Location within Utah Location within the United States
- Country: United States
- State: Utah
- County: Salt Lake
- Parent range: Wasatch Range; Rocky Mountains
- Topo map: USGS Brighton

Geology
- Rock age: 33 Ma
- Rock type: Granodiorite (Igneous rock)

Climbing
- Easiest route: class 2+ scrambling

Mount Wolverine is a 10,795-foot-elevation (3,290-meter) summit in Salt Lake County, Utah, United States.

== Description ==
Mount Wolverine is located 20 miles (32 km) southeast of downtown Salt Lake City between the Alta Ski Area and the Brighton Ski Resort in the Wasatch–Cache National Forest. The peak is set in the Wasatch Range which is a subset of the Rocky Mountains. Precipitation runoff from the mountain's north slope drains into headwaters of Big Cottonwood Creek, whereas the south slope drains into headwaters of Little Cottonwood Creek. Topographic relief is significant as the summit rises 1,800 feet (549 meters) above Little Cottonwood Canyon in approximately one mile (1.6 km). Mount Wolverine is composed of granodiorite of the igneous Alta stock. This mountain's toponym has been officially adopted by the United States Board on Geographic Names.

== Climate ==
Mount Wolverine has a subarctic climate (Köppen Dfc), bordering on an Alpine climate (Köppen ET), with long, cold, snowy winters, and cool to warm summers. Due to its altitude, it receives precipitation all year, as snow in winter, and as thunderstorms in summer.

== Gallery ==
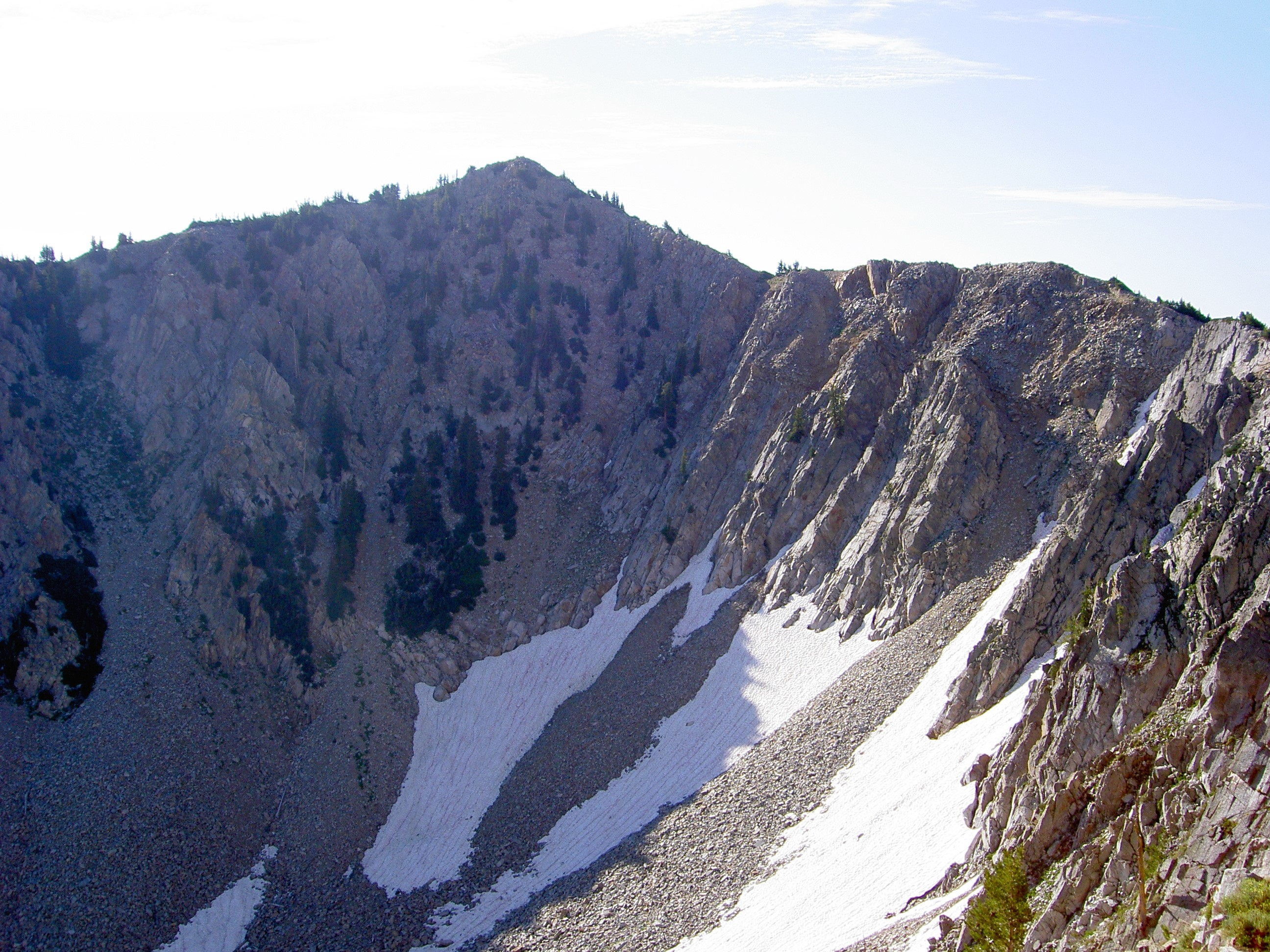
Northwest face above the cirque

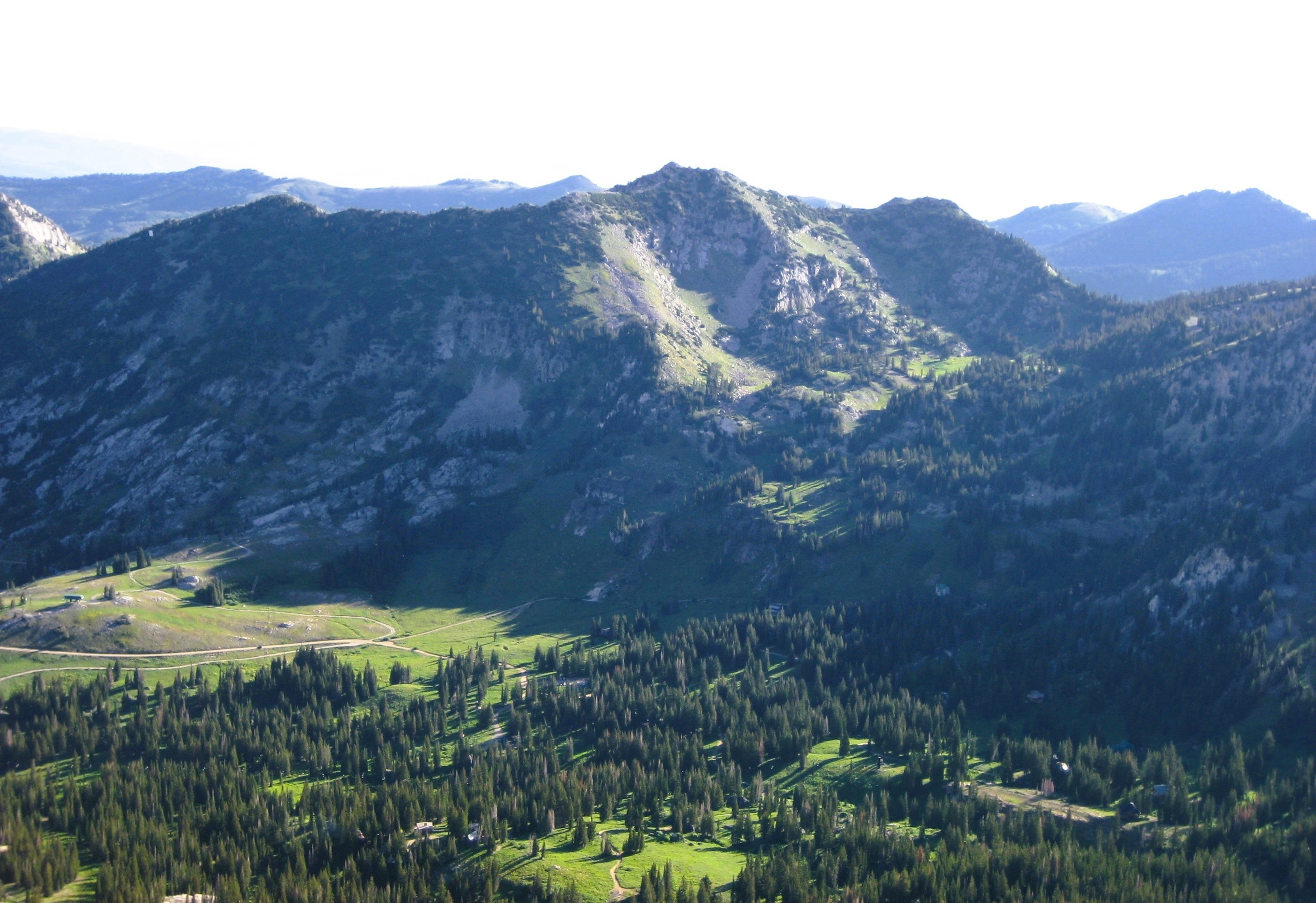
Southwest aspect viewed from Sugarloaf Mountain. Albion Basin below.

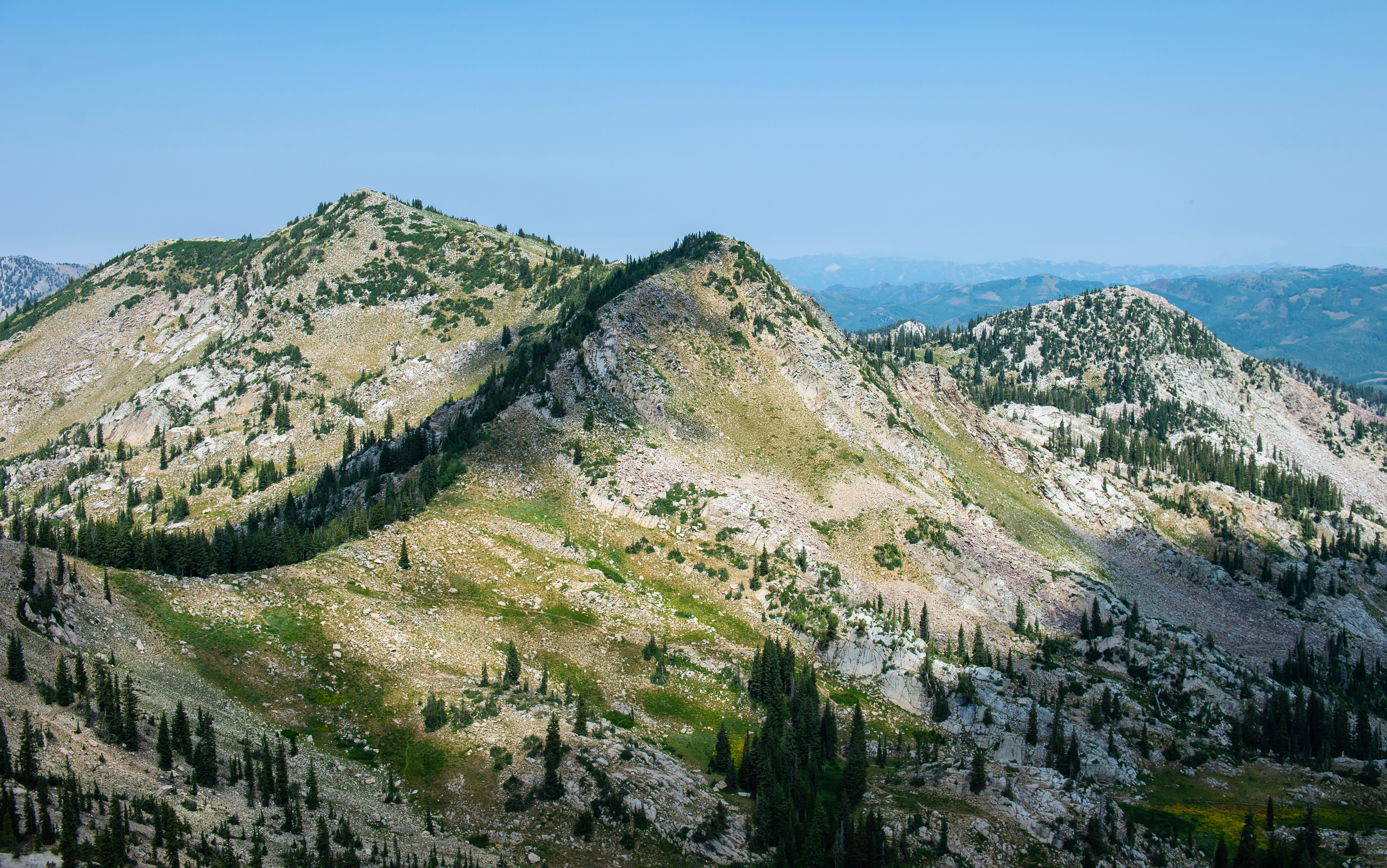
View from Sunset Peak with Mount Wolverine (upper left), Mount Tuscarora (center), and Mount Millicent (right).
