= Knee Weakener =

Mountain in the American state of Utah

Coordinates: 40°38′24″N 112°08′29″W

Knee Weakener is a summit on the west side of Salt Lake County, Utah, United States. The summit has an elevation of 6,860 feet (2,091 m) NGVD 29.
