= Wasatch Peak =

Mountain in Utah, United States

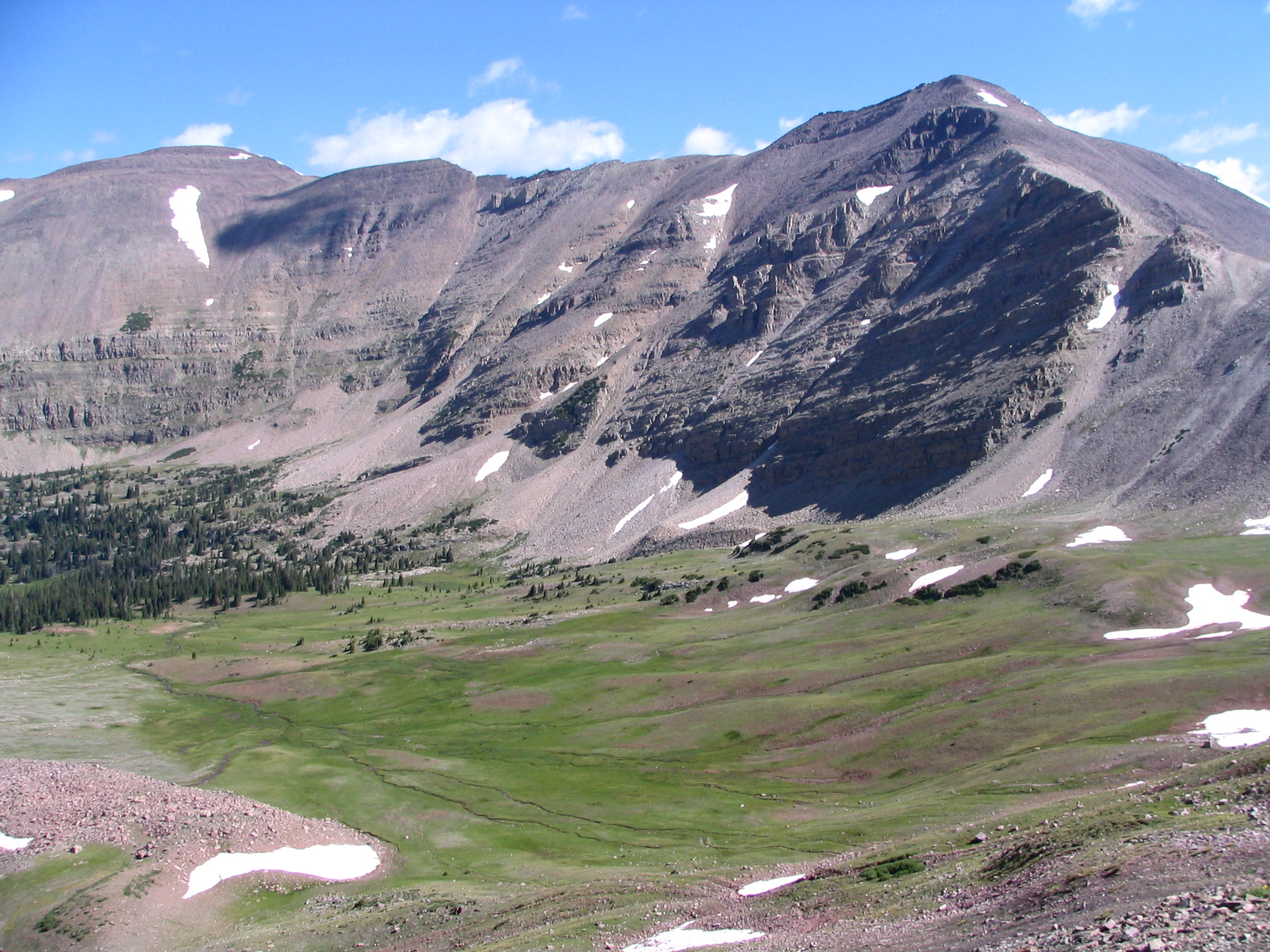
- Southwest aspect, from near Red Knob Pass

Highest point
- Elevation: 13,156 ft (4,010 m)
- Prominence: 836 ft (255 m)
- Parent peak: Tokewanna Peak (13,165 ft)
- Isolation: 1.85 mi (2.98 km)
- Coordinates: 40°47′00″N 110°37′25″W

Geography
- Location within Utah Location within the United States
- Location: High Uintas Wilderness
- Country: United States of America
- State: Utah
- County: Summit
- Parent range: Uinta Mountains; Rocky Mountains
- Topo map: USGS Mount Lovenia

Geology
- Rock age: Neoproterozoic
- Rock type: Metasedimentary rock

Climbing
- Easiest route: class 2 scrambling

Wasatch Peak is a 13,156-foot elevation (4,010 m) mountain summit located in Summit County, Utah, United States.

== Description ==
Wasatch Peak is set within the High Uintas Wilderness on land managed by Uinta-Wasatch-Cache National Forest. It is situated one mile north of the crest of the Uinta Mountains which are a subset of the Rocky Mountains. It ranks as the 14th-highest summit in Utah, and 55th-highest in the United States if a 400-foot clean prominence cutoff is considered as criteria. Neighbors include Mount Beulah three miles to the west-northwest, Mount Lovenia two miles to the south-southeast, and Dead Horse Peak is five miles to the southwest. Precipitation runoff from the mountain's west slope drains to the West Fork of Blacks Fork, whereas the east slope drains into headwaters of East Fork Blacks Fork. Topographic relief is significant as the summit rises 2,100 feet (640 meters) in one mile from the valleys on either side. This mountain's toponym has not been officially adopted by the United States Board on Geographic Names and will remain unofficial as long as the USGS policy of not adopting new toponyms in designated wilderness areas remains in effect. It is labelled on USGS topographic maps as "Wasatch" benchmark.

== Climate ==
Based on the Köppen climate classification, Wasatch Peak is located in a subarctic climate zone with cold snowy winters and mild summers. Tundra climate characterizes the summit and highest slopes.

== See also ==
- Geology of the Uinta Mountains
