= The Cathedral (Summit County, Utah) =

Mountain in Utah, United States

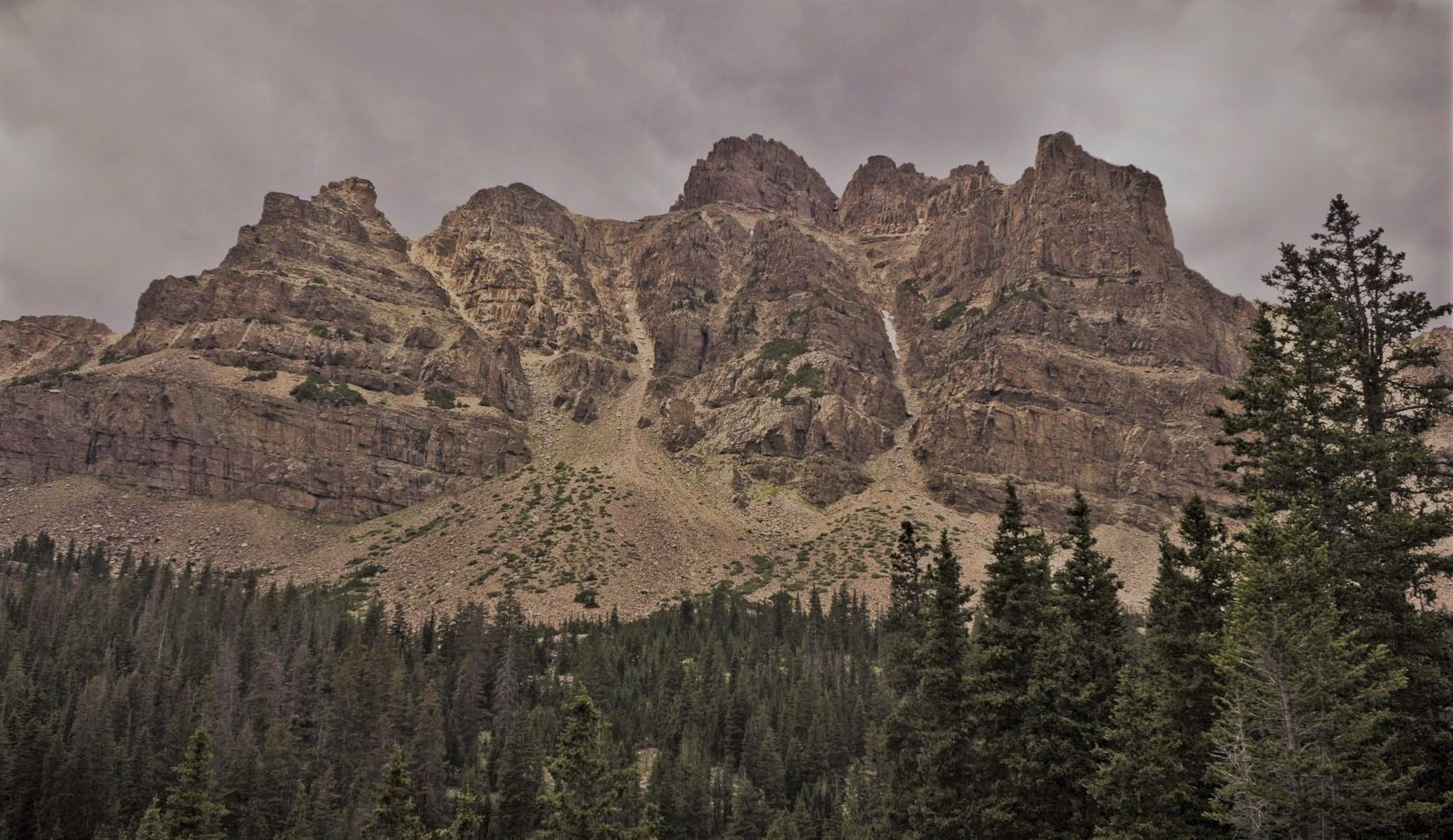
- East aspect

Highest point
- Elevation: 12,224 ft (3,726 m)
- Prominence: 464 ft (141 m)
- Isolation: 0.69 mi (1.11 km)
- Coordinates: 40°46′32″N 110°42′37″W

Geography
- Location within Utah Location within the United States
- Location: High Uintas Wilderness
- Country: United States of America
- State: Utah
- County: Summit
- Parent range: Uinta Mountains; Rocky Mountains
- Topo map: USGS Red Knob

Geology
- Rock age: Neoproterozoic
- Rock type: Metasedimentary rock

Climbing
- Easiest route: class 2+ scrambling

The Cathedral is a 12,224-foot elevation (3,726 m) mountain summit located in Summit County, Utah, United States.

== Description ==
The Cathedral is set within the High Uintas Wilderness on land managed by Uinta-Wasatch-Cache National Forest. It is situated in the Uinta Mountains which are a subset of the Rocky Mountains, and it ranks as the 87th-highest summit in Utah. Topographic relief is significant as the summit rises 2,000 feet (610 meters) in one mile. Neighbors include Ostler Peak 3.7 miles to the southwest, Mount Beulah two miles northeast, Yard Peak 1.6 mile to the south, and Dead Horse Peak is 2.4 miles to the south-southeast. Precipitation runoff from this mountain drains north to the East Fork Bear River. This mountain's toponym has been officially adopted by the United States Board on Geographic Names.

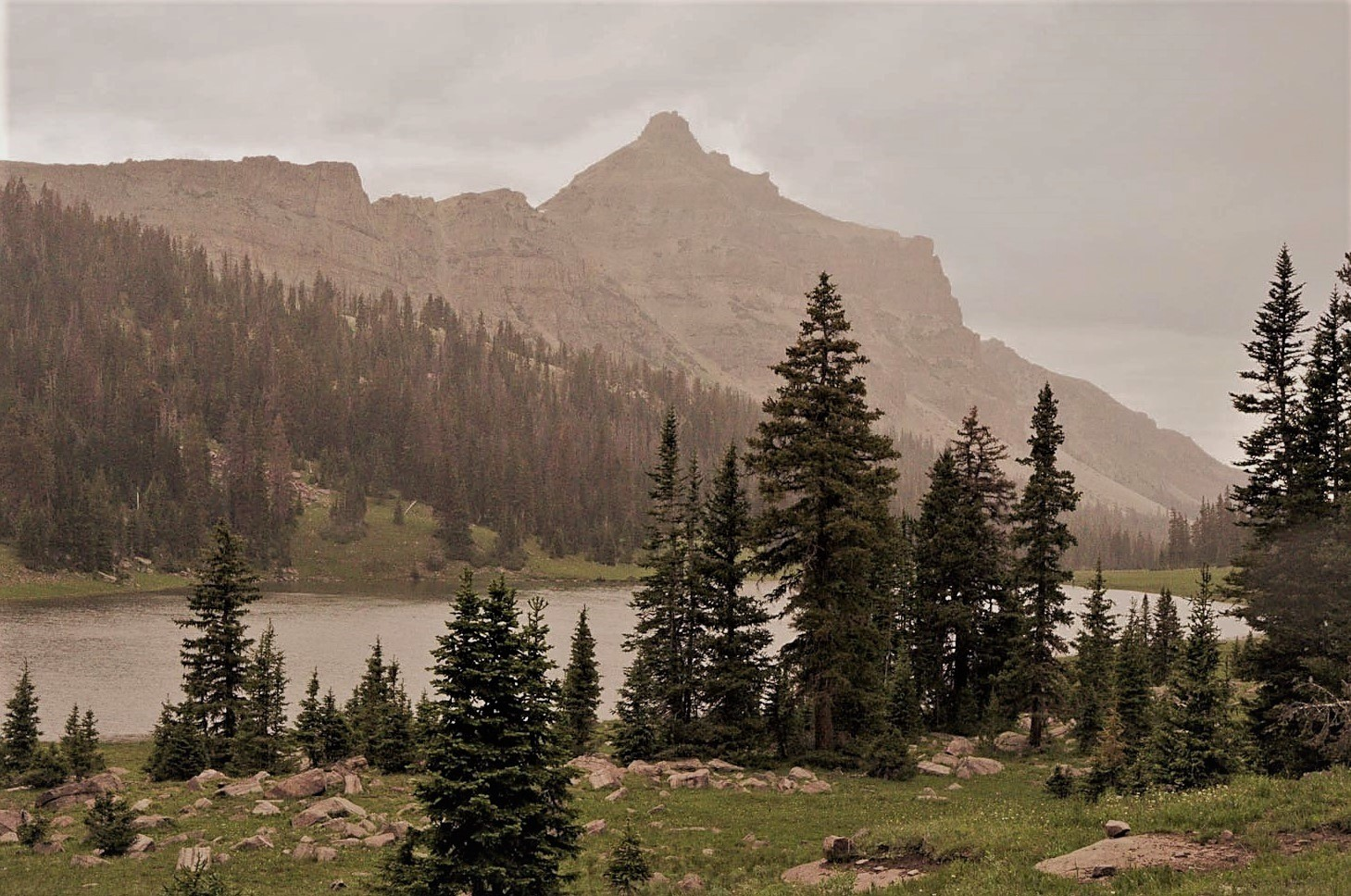
The Cathedral from Allsop Lake

== Climate ==
Based on the Köppen climate classification, The Cathedral is located in a subarctic climate zone with cold snowy winters and mild summers. Tundra climate characterizes the summit and highest slopes.

== See also ==
- Geology of the Uinta Mountains
