= La cathédrale =

La cathédrale is French for "The Cathedral", and may refer to:

- La Cathédrale (film)
- La Cathedrale (Stradivarius violin)
- The Cathedral (Huysmans novel), originally La Cathédrale in French
- Cathedral of Our Lady of the Angels

== See also ==
- Cathedral (disambiguation)
- La cathédrale engloutie
