= Mount Beulah =

Mountain in Utah, United States

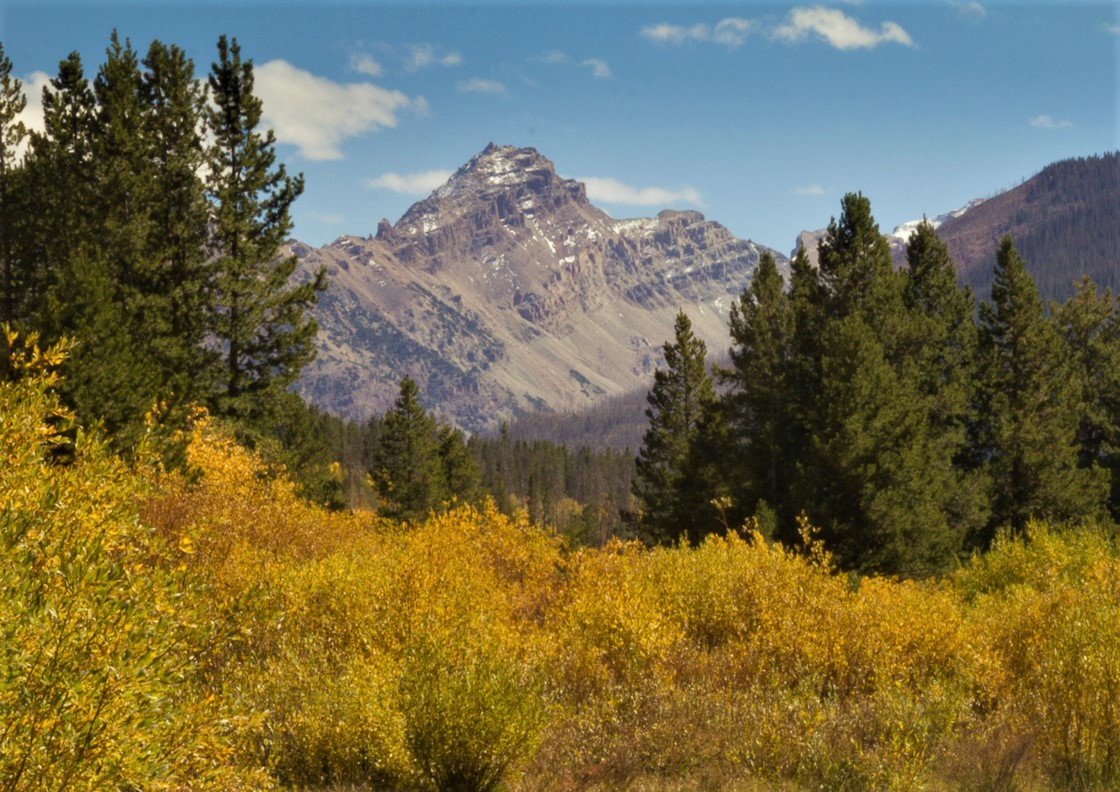
- Northwest aspect

Highest point
- Elevation: 12,557 ft (3,827 m)
- Prominence: 717 ft (219 m)
- Isolation: 1.41 mi (2.27 km)
- Coordinates: 40°47′37″N 110°40′55″W

Geography
- Location within Utah Location within the United States
- Country: United States of America
- State: Utah
- County: Summit
- Protected area: High Uintas Wilderness
- Parent range: Uinta Mountains; Rocky Mountains
- Topo map: USGS Red Knob

Geology
- Rock age: Neoproterozoic
- Rock type: Metasedimentary rock

Climbing
- Easiest route: class 3 scrambling

Mount Beulah is a 12,557-foot elevation (3,827 m) mountain summit located in Summit County, Utah, United States.

== Description ==
Mount Beulah is set within the High Uintas Wilderness on land managed by Uinta-Wasatch-Cache National Forest. It is situated in the Uinta Mountains which are a subset of the Rocky Mountains, and it ranks as the 55th-highest summit in Utah. Neighbors include The Cathedral two miles to the southwest, Yard Peak 3.3 miles to the south-southwest, and Dead Horse Peak is 3.5 miles to the south. Precipitation runoff from the mountain's west slope drains to the Bear River, whereas the east slope drains to the Blacks Fork. Topographic relief is significant as the summit rises over 2,500 feet (760 meters) in one mile from glacial U-shaped valleys on either side. This mountain's toponym has been officially adopted by the United States Board on Geographic Names.

== Climate ==
Based on the Köppen climate classification, Mount Beulah is located in a subarctic climate zone with cold snowy winters and mild summers. Tundra climate characterizes the summit and highest slopes.

Climate data for Mount Beulah 40.7678 N, 110.6854 W, Elevation: 12,238 ft (3,730 m) (1991–2020 normals)
Month	Jan	Feb	Mar	Apr	May	Jun	Jul	Aug	Sep	Oct	Nov	Dec	Year
Mean daily maximum °F (°C)	23.6 (−4.7)	23.7 (−4.6)	30.2 (−1.0)	34.8 (1.6)	43.0 (6.1)	53.6 (12.0)	61.4 (16.3)	59.8 (15.4)	52.0 (11.1)	40.8 (4.9)	29.7 (−1.3)	23.2 (−4.9)	39.7 (4.2)
Daily mean °F (°C)	13.3 (−10.4)	12.4 (−10.9)	17.7 (−7.9)	22.0 (−5.6)	30.6 (−0.8)	40.9 (4.9)	48.5 (9.2)	47.1 (8.4)	39.6 (4.2)	29.3 (−1.5)	19.5 (−6.9)	13.1 (−10.5)	27.8 (−2.3)
Mean daily minimum °F (°C)	2.9 (−16.2)	1.1 (−17.2)	5.1 (−14.9)	9.3 (−12.6)	18.1 (−7.7)	28.2 (−2.1)	35.6 (2.0)	34.4 (1.3)	27.3 (−2.6)	17.8 (−7.9)	9.3 (−12.6)	3.0 (−16.1)	16.0 (−8.9)
Average precipitation inches (mm)	4.41 (112)	4.13 (105)	3.96 (101)	4.19 (106)	3.69 (94)	2.35 (60)	2.18 (55)	2.47 (63)	3.10 (79)	3.48 (88)	3.62 (92)	4.04 (103)	41.62 (1,058)
Source: PRISM Climate Group

== See also ==
- Geology of the Uinta Mountains
