= Yard Peak =

Mountain in Utah, United States

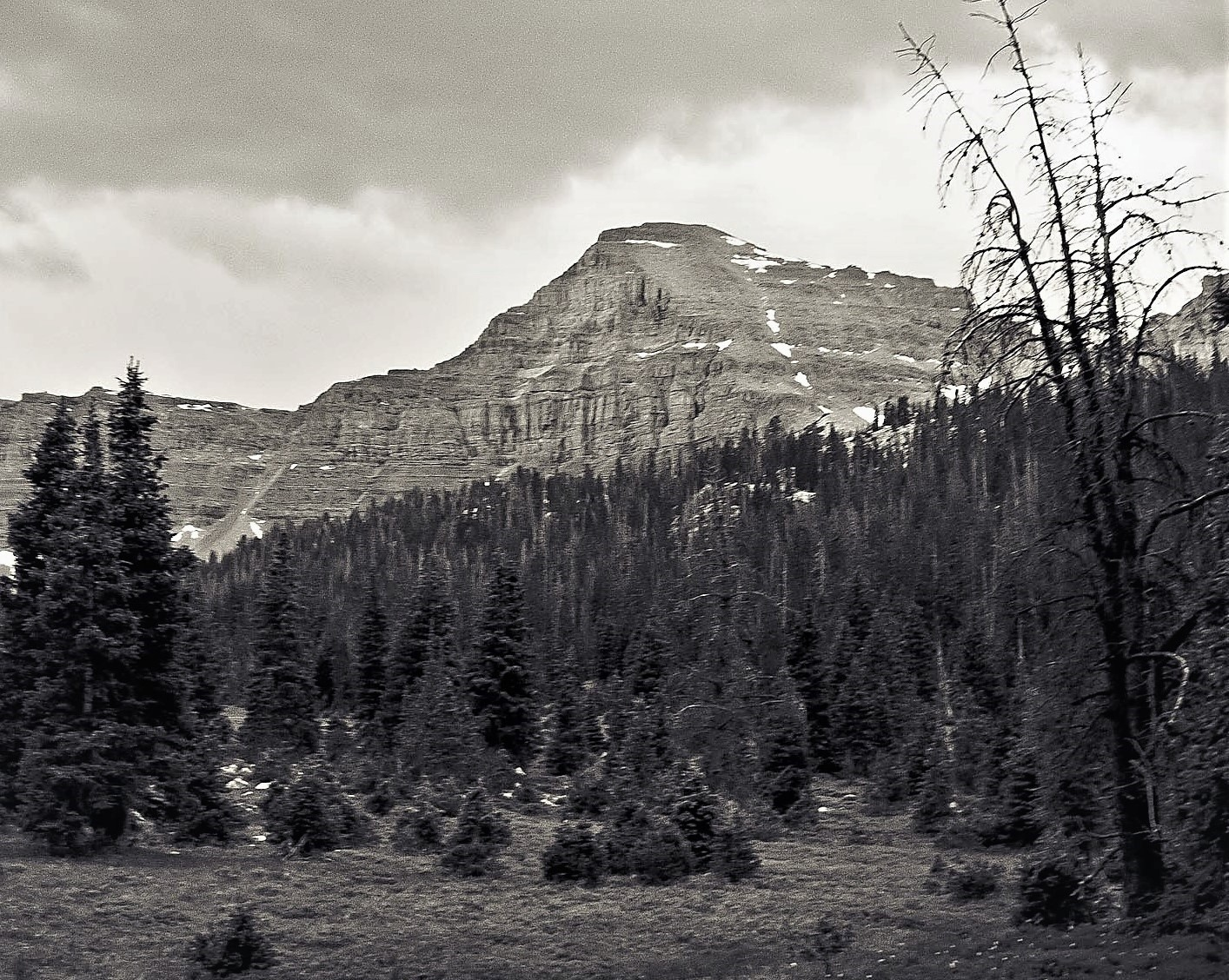
- Northeast aspect

Highest point
- Elevation: 12,706 ft (3,873 m)
- Prominence: 1,106 ft (337 m)
- Parent peak: Lamotte Peak (12,720 ft)
- Isolation: 2.51 mi (4.04 km)
- Coordinates: 40°45′10″N 110°42′48″W

Naming
- Etymology: Robert Sterling Yard

Geography
- Location within Utah Location within the United States
- Location: High Uintas Wilderness
- Country: United States of America
- State: Utah
- County: Summit / Duchesne
- Parent range: Uinta Mountains; Rocky Mountains
- Topo map: USGS Red Knob

Geology
- Rock age: Neoproterozoic
- Rock type: Metasedimentary rock

Climbing
- Easiest route: class 2+ scrambling

Yard Peak is a 12,706-foot elevation (3,873 m) mountain summit located on the common border that Duchesne County shares with Summit County in the U.S. state of Utah.

== Description ==
Yard Peak is set within the High Uintas Wilderness on land managed by Uinta-Wasatch-Cache National Forest. It is situated along the crest of the Uinta Mountains which are a subset of the Rocky Mountains, and it ranks as the 40th-highest summit in Utah. Topographic relief is significant as the summit rises 2,100 feet (640 meters) above Allsop Lake in one mile. Neighbors include Ostler Peak three miles to the west, The Cathedral two miles to the north, and Dead Horse Peak is 1.5 mile southeast. Precipitation runoff from this mountain drains north to the East Fork Bear River and south into headwaters of Rock Creek which is a tributary of the Duchesne River. This mountain's toponym has been officially adopted by the United States Board on Geographic Names.

== Climate ==
Based on the Köppen climate classification, Yard Peak is located in a subarctic climate zone with cold snowy winters and mild summers. Tundra climate characterizes the summit and highest slopes.

== Gallery ==
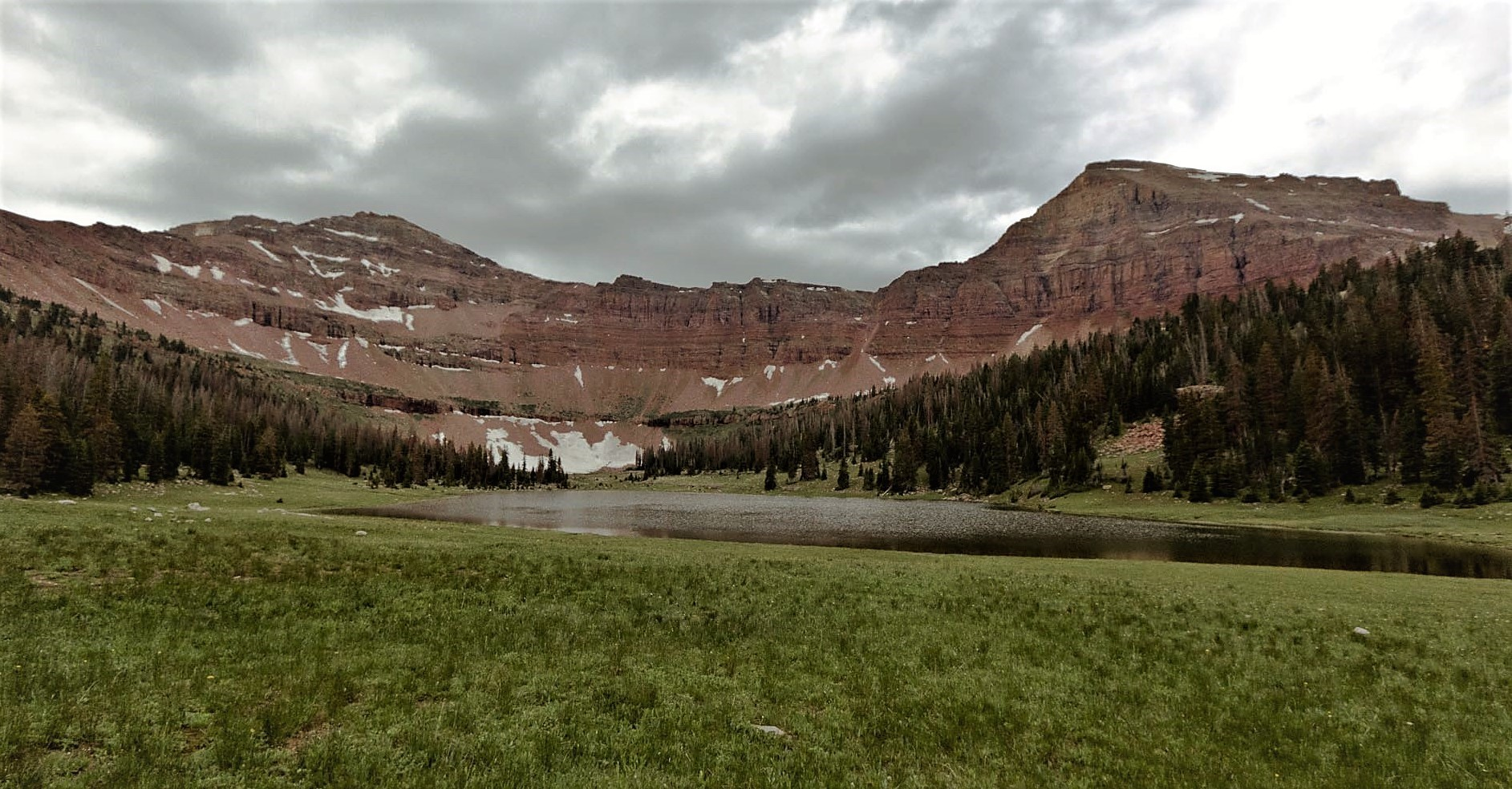
Dead Horse Peak (left) with Yard Peak (right) from Allsop Lake

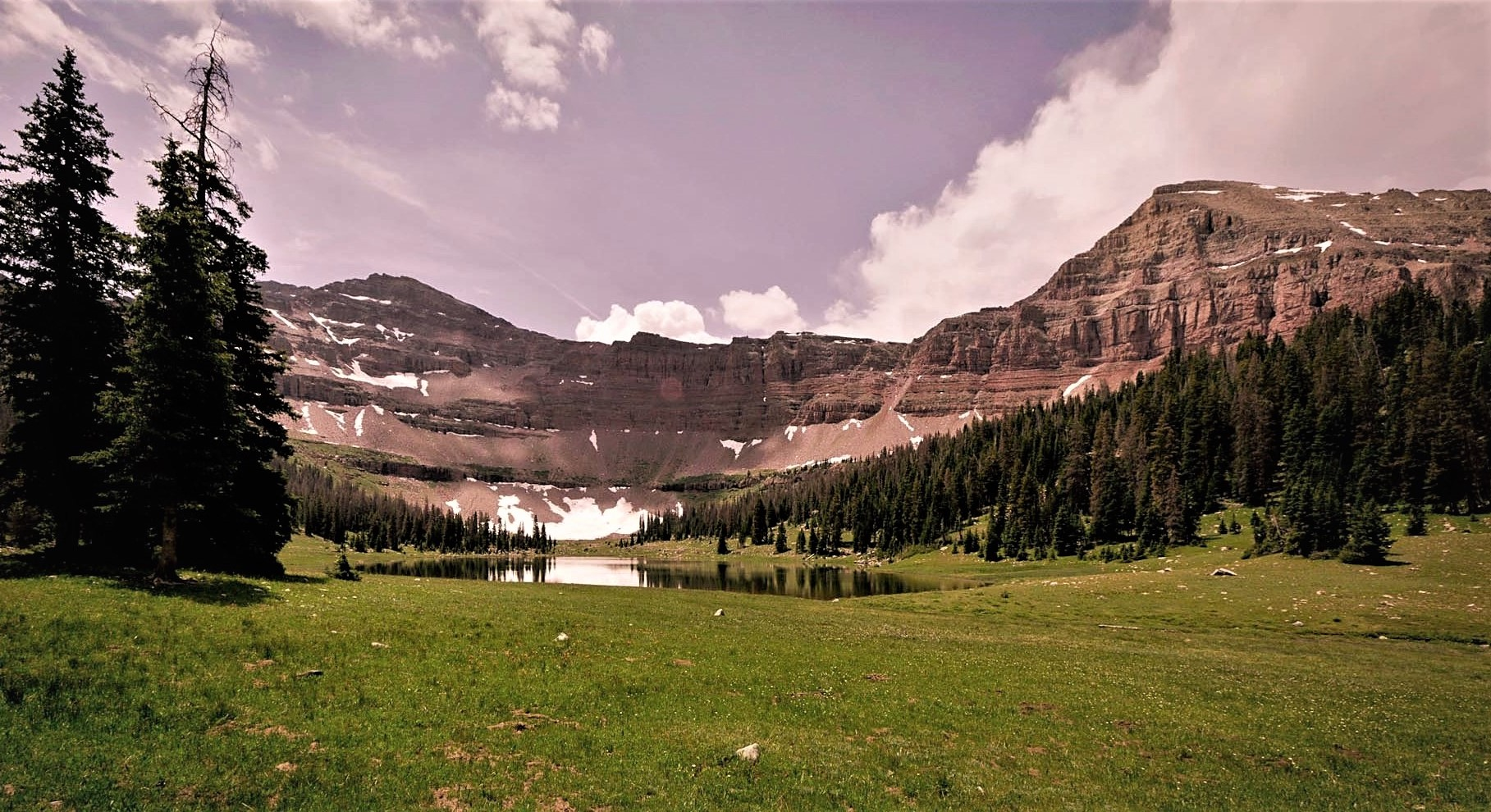
Dead Horse Peak (left), Allsop Lake, Yard Peak (right)

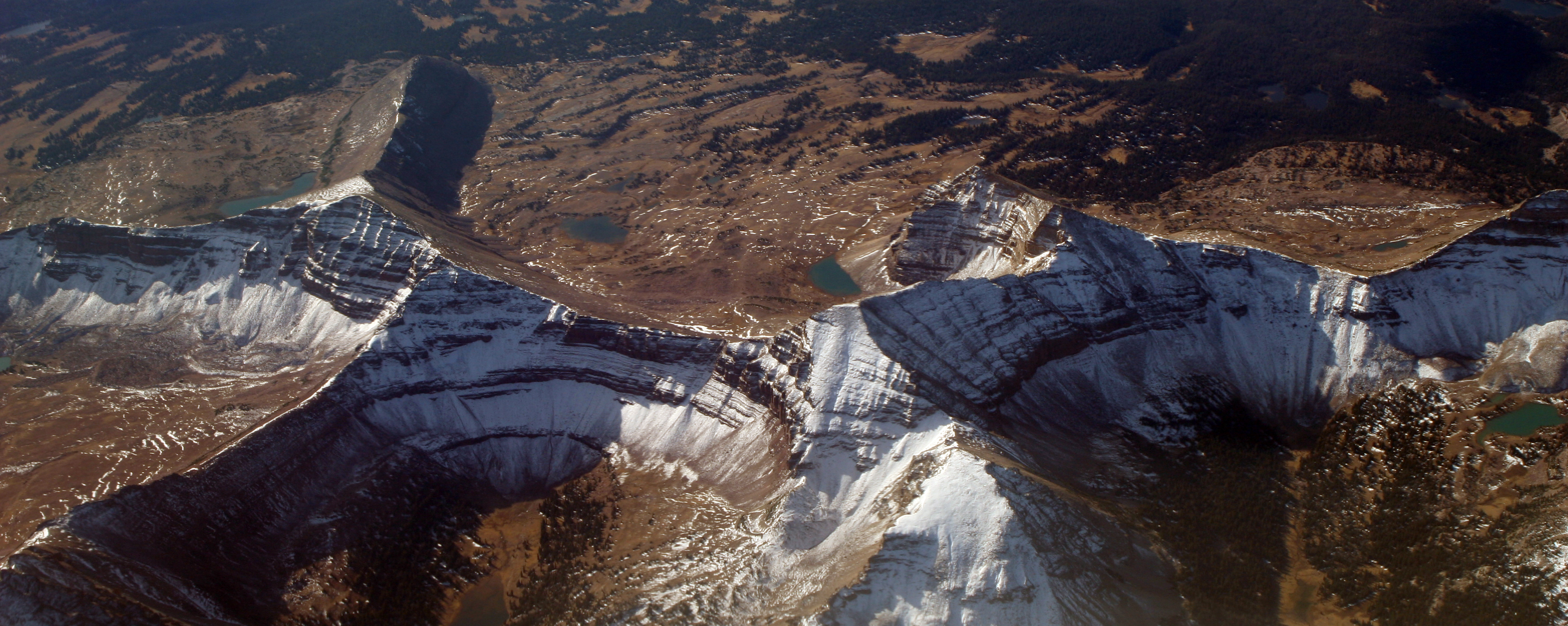
Dead Horse Peak (left) and Yard Peak (right of center) viewed from the north from airliner.

== See also ==
- Geology of the Uinta Mountains
