= Ostler Peak =

Mountain in Utah, United States

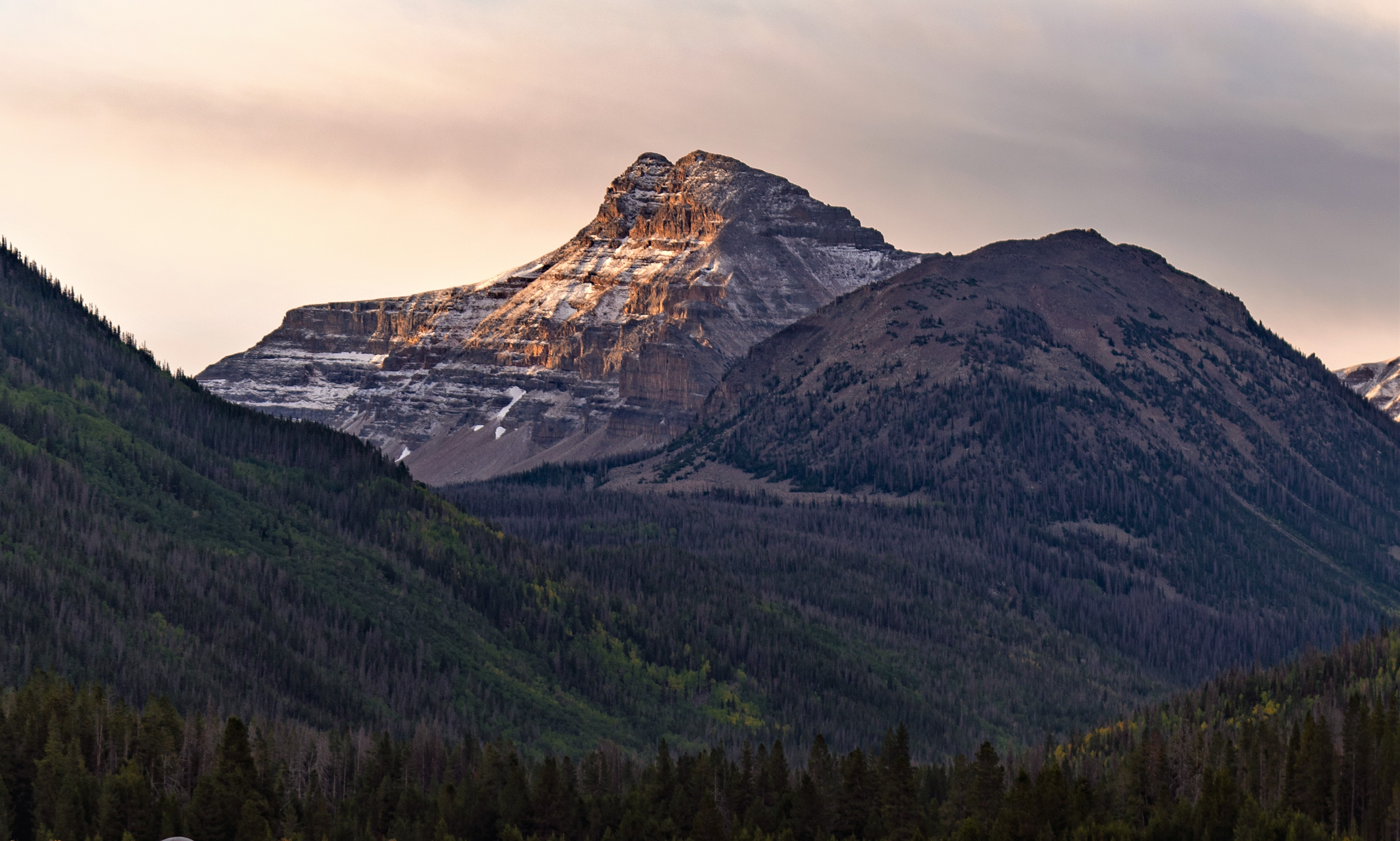
- North aspect

Highest point
- Elevation: 12,718 ft (3,876 m)
- Prominence: 1,158 ft (353 m)
- Parent peak: Lamotte Peak (12,720 ft)
- Isolation: 2.07 mi (3.33 km)
- Coordinates: 40°44′48″N 110°46′08″W

Naming
- Etymology: Dick Ostler

Geography
- Location within Utah Location within the United States
- Location: High Uintas Wilderness
- Country: United States of America
- State: Utah
- County: Summit
- Parent range: Uinta Mountains; Rocky Mountains
- Topo map: USGS Hayden Peak

Geology
- Rock age: Neoproterozoic
- Rock type: Metasedimentary rock

Climbing
- Easiest route: class 2 scrambling

Ostler Peak is a 12,718-foot elevation (3,876 m) mountain summit located in Summit County, Utah, United States.

== Description ==
Ostler Peak is set within the High Uintas Wilderness on land managed by Uinta-Wasatch-Cache National Forest. It is situated along the crest of the Uinta Mountains which are a subset of the Rocky Mountains, and it ranks as the 37th-highest summit in Utah. Topographic relief is significant as the summit rises over 1,900 feet (580 meters) above Amethyst Lake in one-half mile. Neighbors include Spread Eagle Peak 1.4 mile to the southwest, Hayden Peak four miles west, and line parent Lamotte Peak two miles north-northeast. Precipitation runoff from this mountain drains into the Ostler and Stillwater forks of the Bear River.

== Etymology ==
The landform's toponym was officially adopted in 1932 by the U.S. Board on Geographic Names to remember the late James Rulon "Dick" Ostler (1900–1931), Uinta National Forest ranger in the Grandaddy Lake region of the Uinta Mountains.

== Climate ==
Based on the Köppen climate classification, Ostler Peak is located in a subarctic climate zone with cold snowy winters and mild summers. Tundra climate characterizes the summit and highest slopes.

Climate data for Ostler Peak 40.7434 N, 110.7697 W, Elevation: 12,224 ft (3,726 m) (1991–2020 normals)
Month	Jan	Feb	Mar	Apr	May	Jun	Jul	Aug	Sep	Oct	Nov	Dec	Year
Mean daily maximum °F (°C)	23.0 (−5.0)	23.2 (−4.9)	29.5 (−1.4)	35.0 (1.7)	43.3 (6.3)	53.9 (12.2)	61.7 (16.5)	60.1 (15.6)	52.2 (11.2)	40.8 (4.9)	29.2 (−1.6)	23.1 (−4.9)	39.6 (4.2)
Daily mean °F (°C)	13.3 (−10.4)	12.5 (−10.8)	17.7 (−7.9)	22.6 (−5.2)	31.1 (−0.5)	41.4 (5.2)	49.2 (9.6)	47.8 (8.8)	40.4 (4.7)	29.8 (−1.2)	19.5 (−6.9)	13.3 (−10.4)	28.2 (−2.1)
Mean daily minimum °F (°C)	3.6 (−15.8)	1.9 (−16.7)	6.0 (−14.4)	10.2 (−12.1)	18.9 (−7.3)	28.9 (−1.7)	36.7 (2.6)	35.6 (2.0)	28.5 (−1.9)	18.7 (−7.4)	9.8 (−12.3)	3.5 (−15.8)	16.9 (−8.4)
Average precipitation inches (mm)	5.63 (143)	5.36 (136)	4.99 (127)	4.98 (126)	4.27 (108)	2.95 (75)	2.17 (55)	2.00 (51)	3.33 (85)	4.33 (110)	4.13 (105)	5.02 (128)	49.16 (1,249)
Source: PRISM Climate Group

== Gallery ==
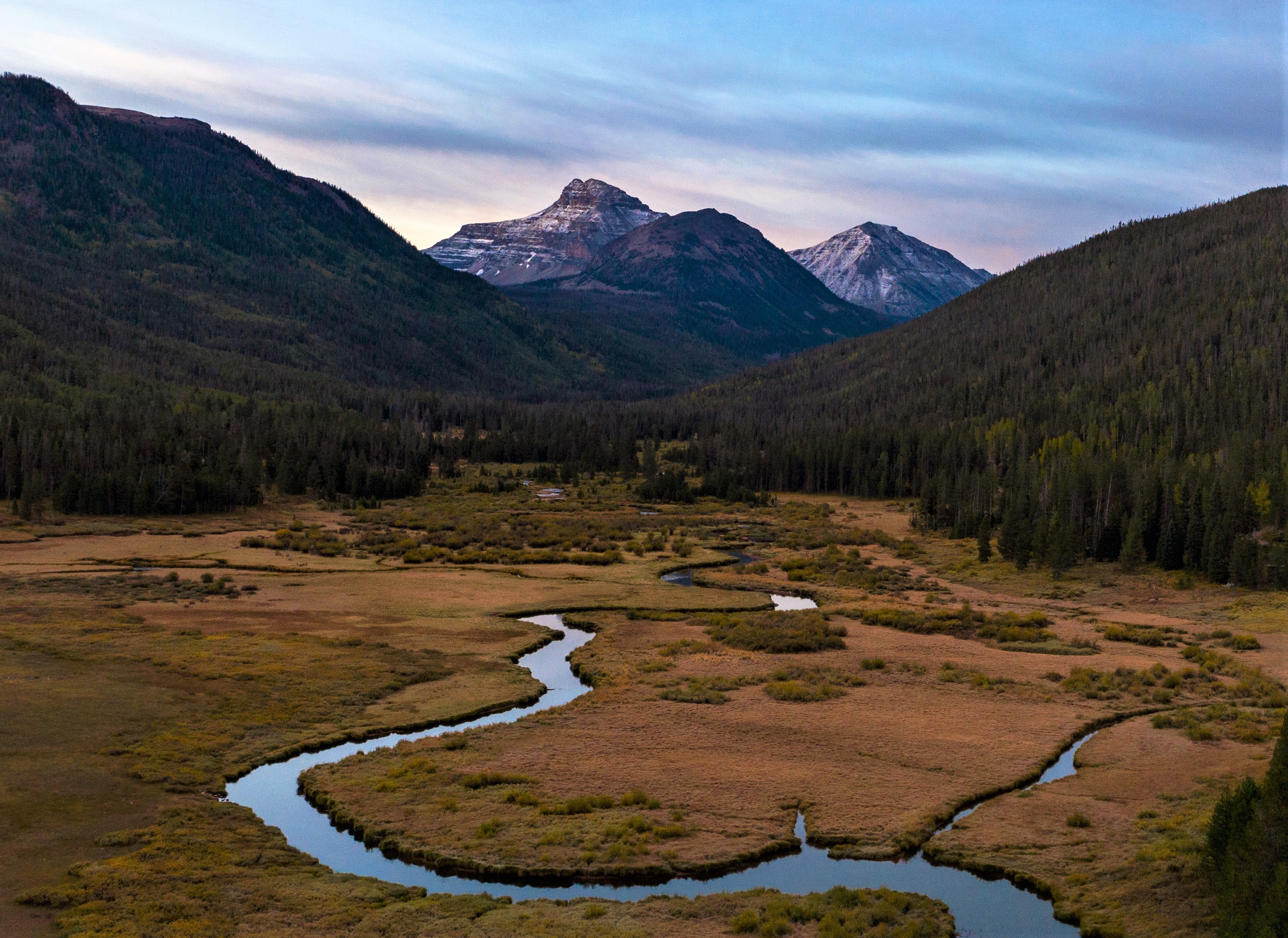
Ostler Peak and Spread Eagle Peak seen from Christmas Meadows
Stillwater Fork of the Bear River in foreground

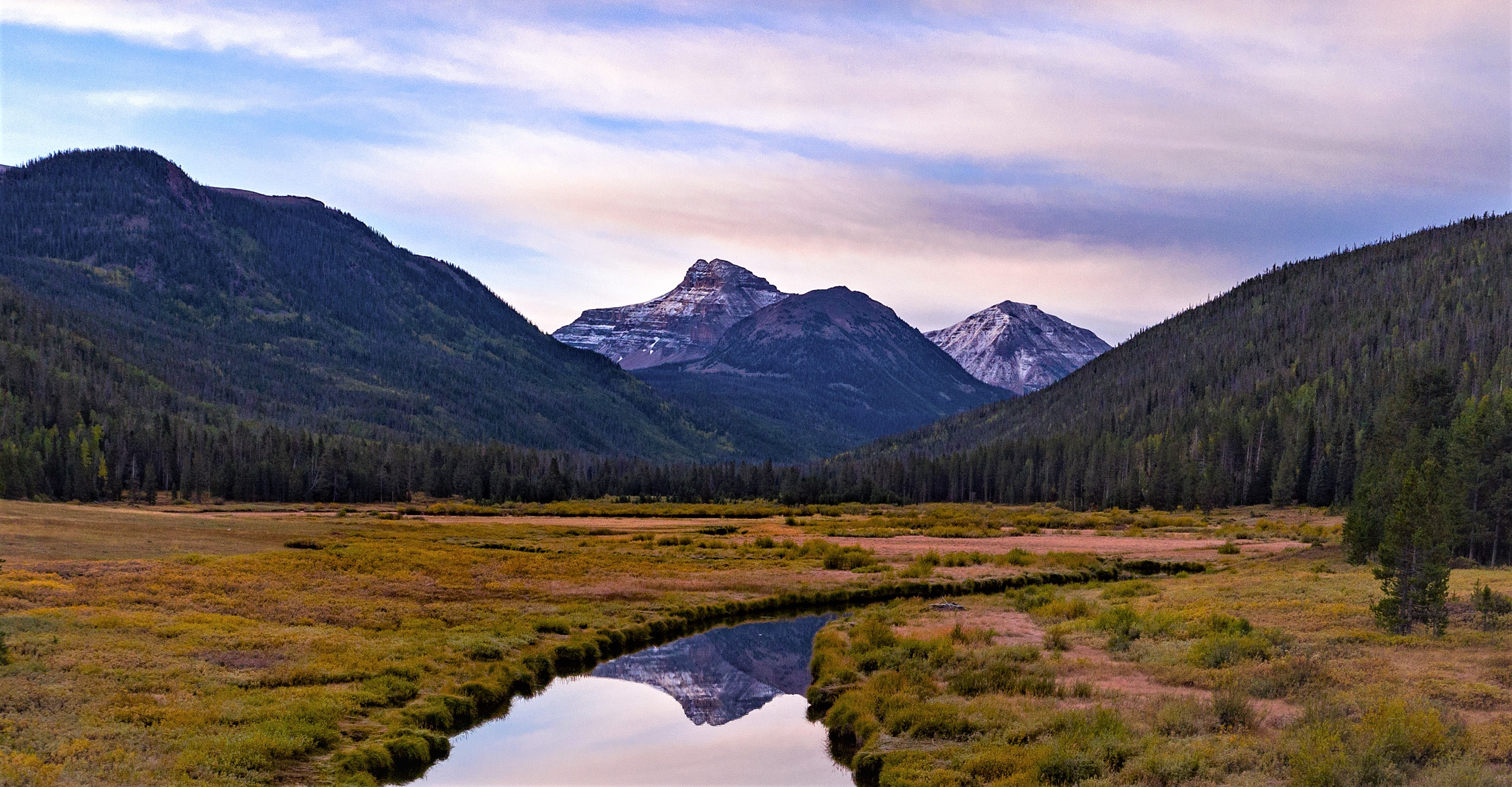
Ostler Peak and Spread Eagle Peak seen from Christmas Meadows

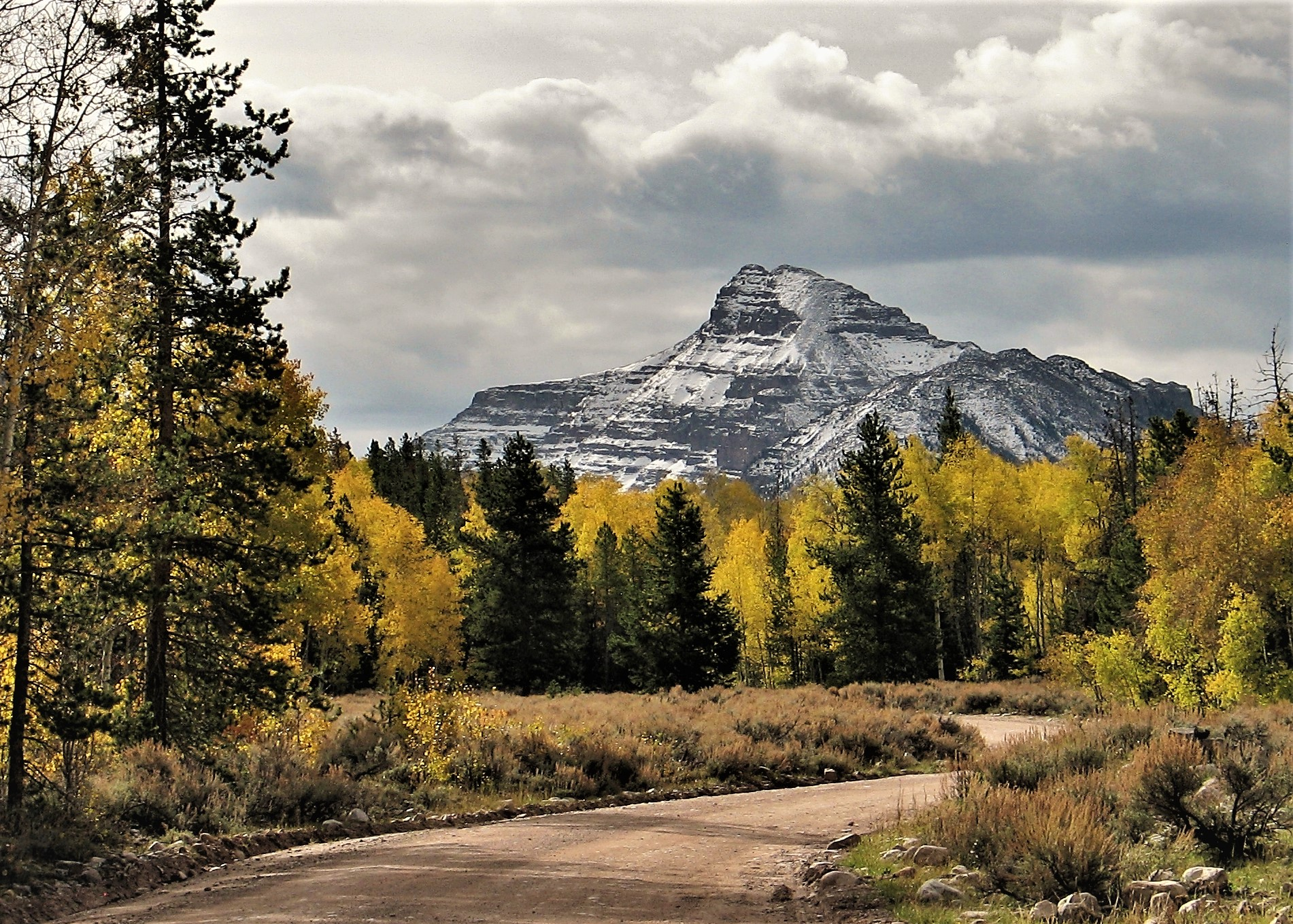
Ostler Peak in autumn

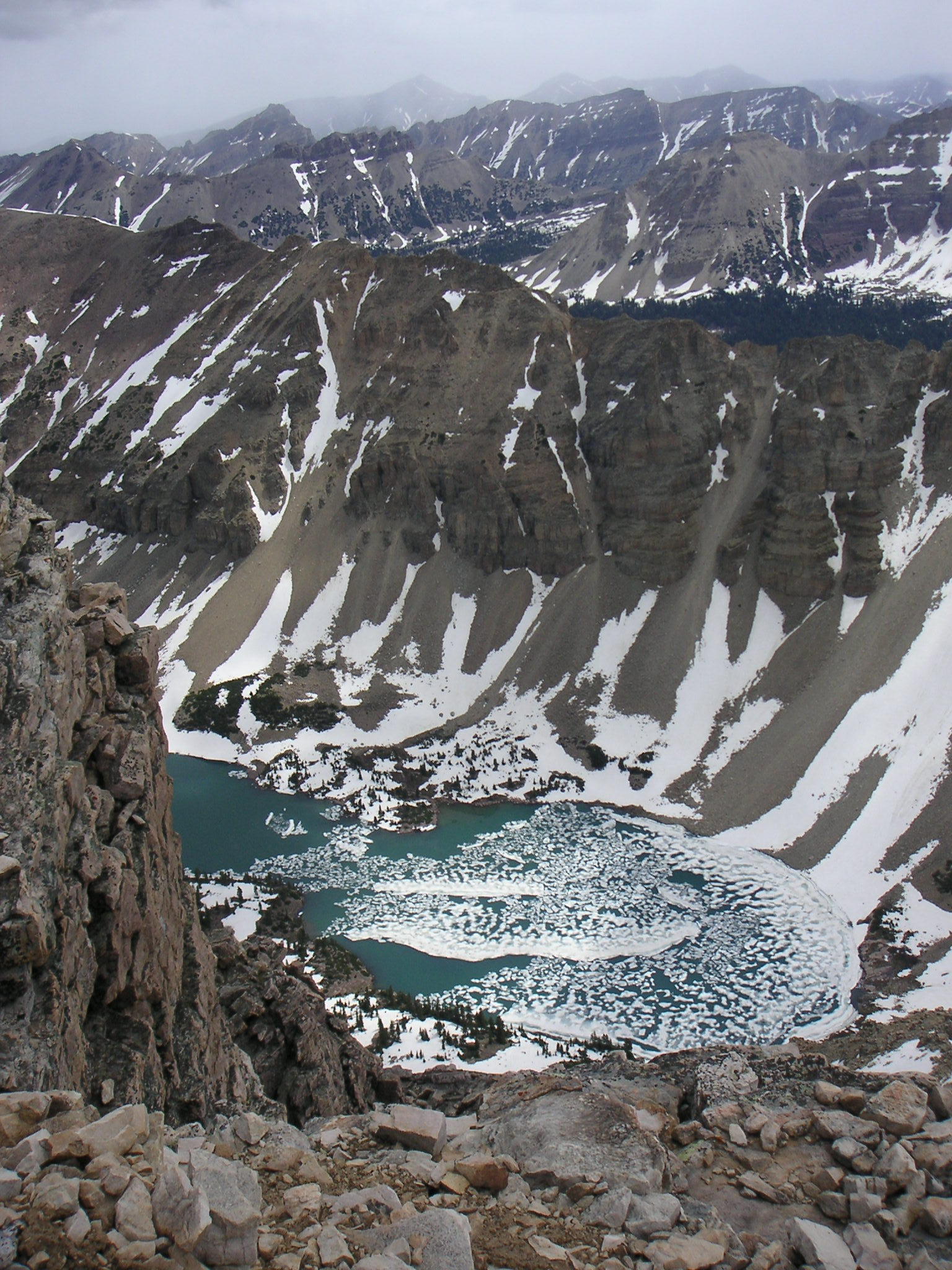
Amethyst Lake viewed from Ostler Peak

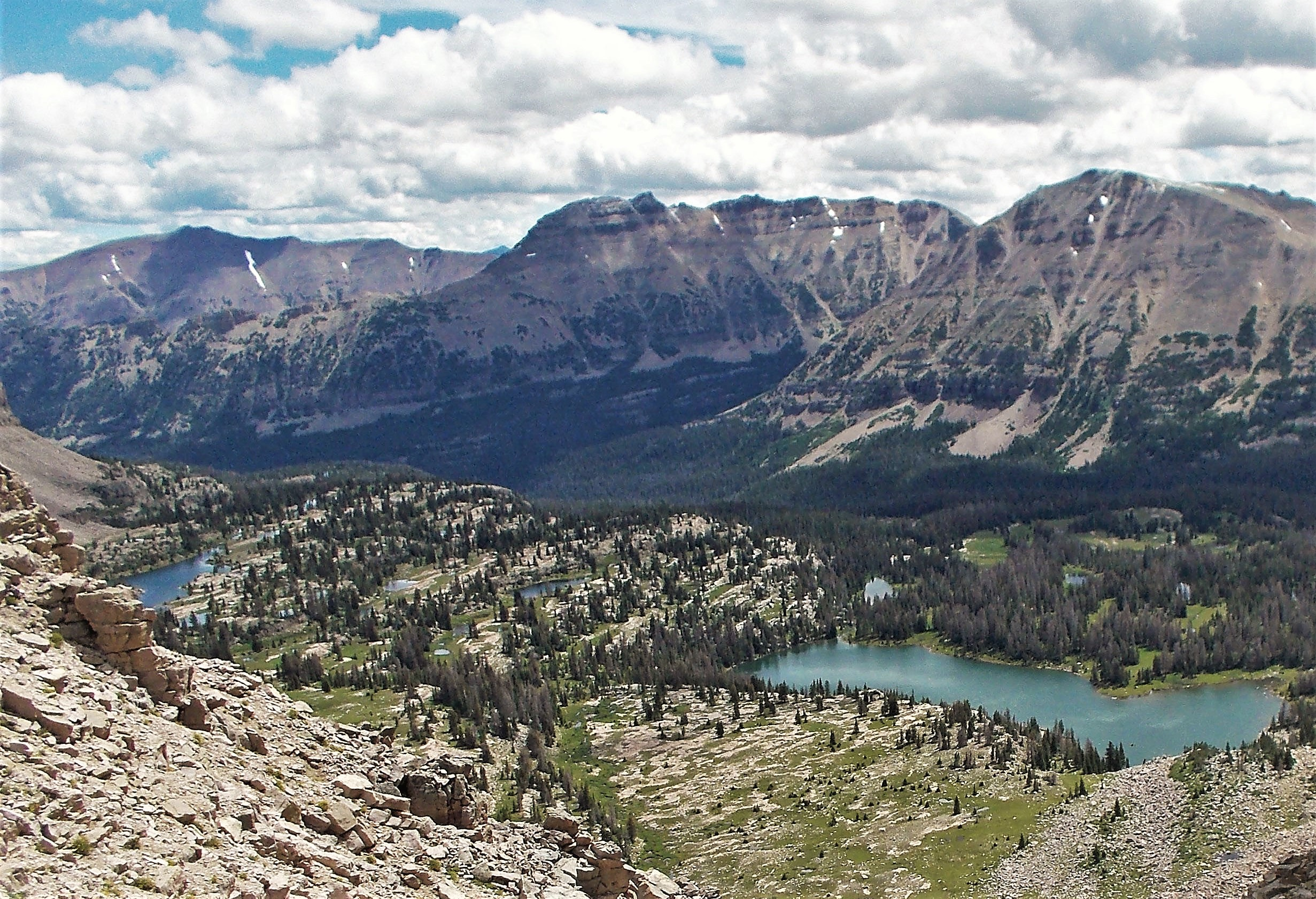
Lamotte Peak (left), Ostler Peak (center), Spread Eagle Peak (right).

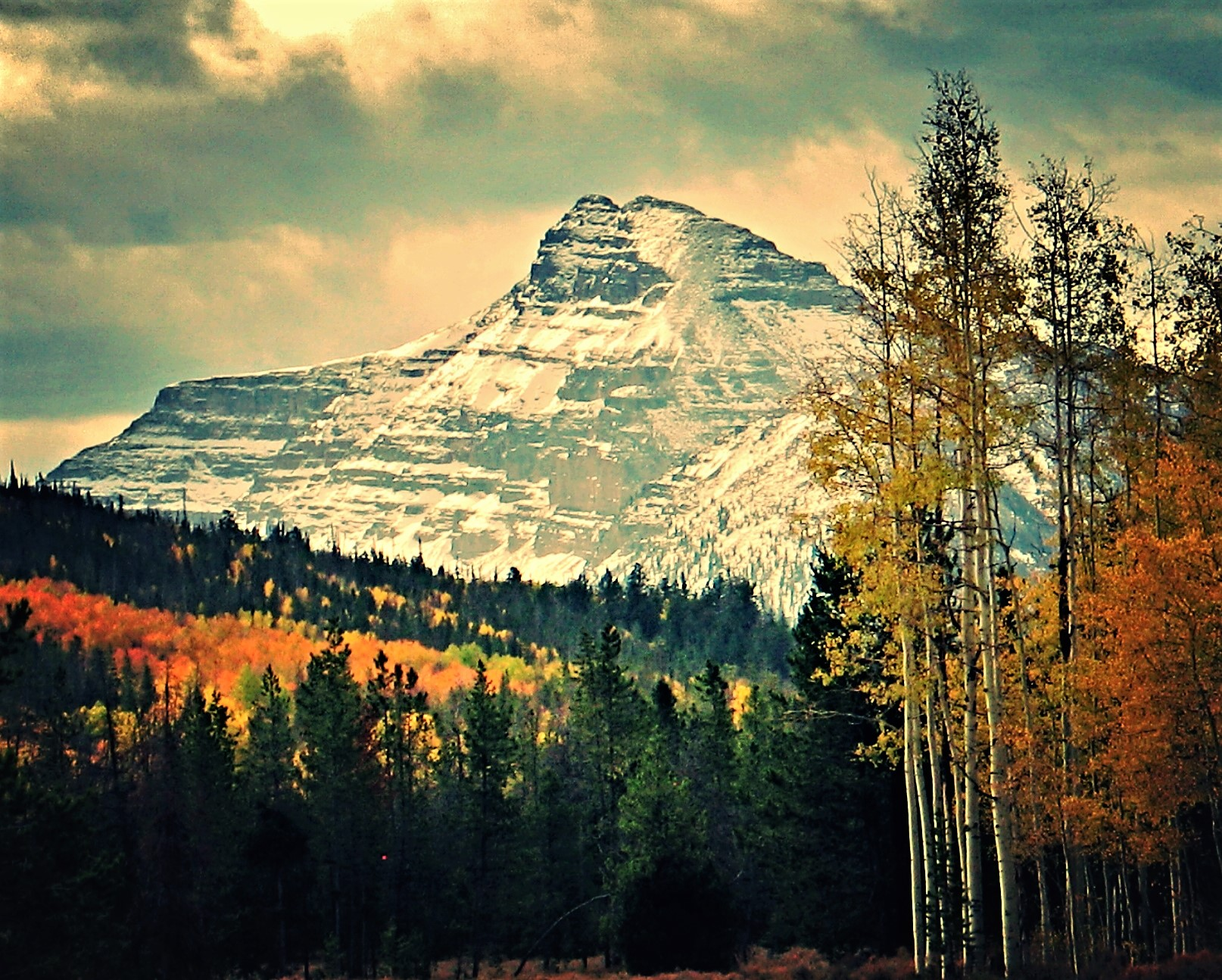
Ostler Peak in autumn

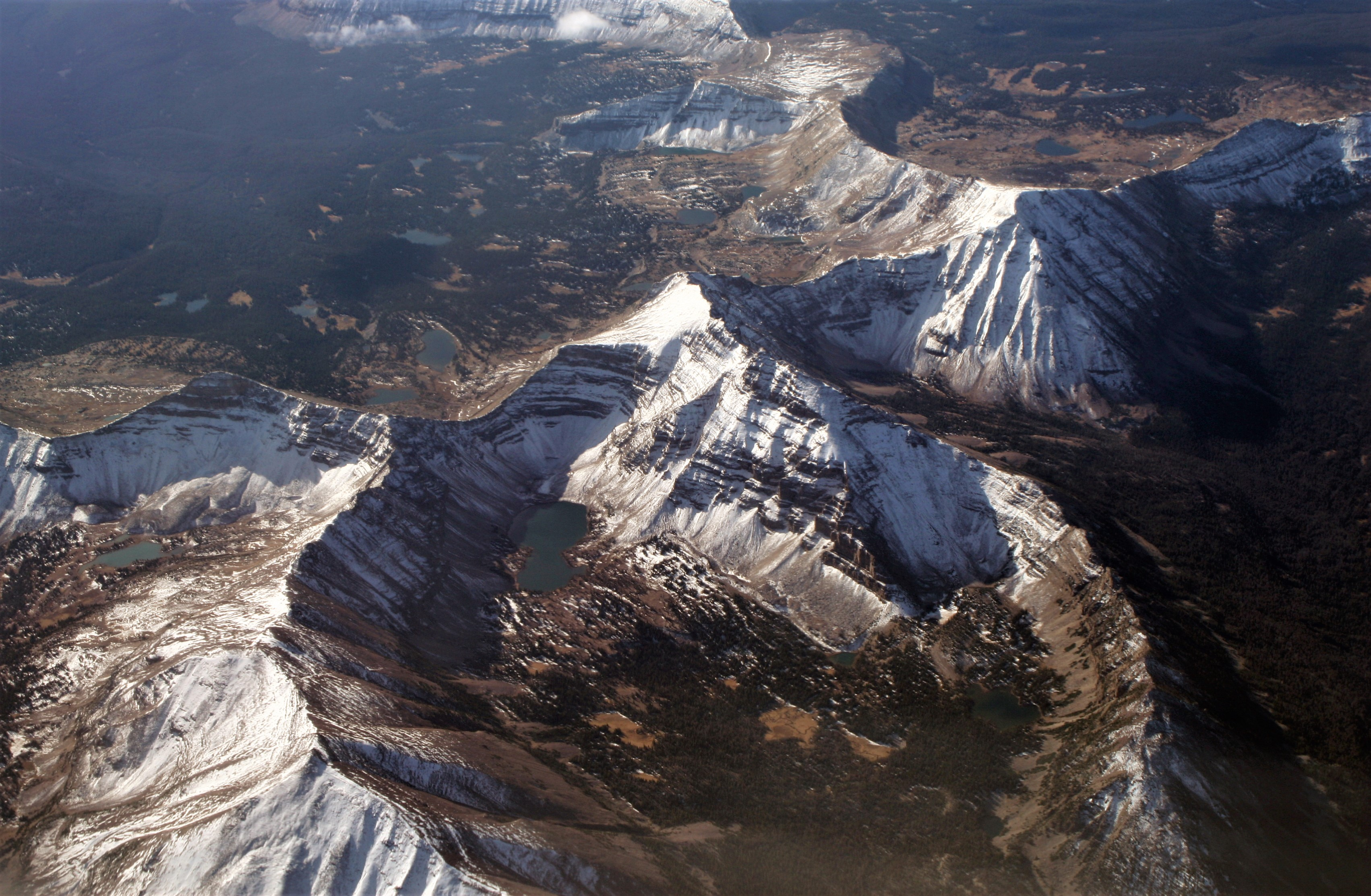
Northeast aspect of Ostler Peak viewed from airliner.

== See also ==
- Geology of the Uinta Mountains
- List of mountains in Utah
