= Kathisma (disambiguation) =

Kathisma (Greek: κάθισμα) may refer to:

- the Greek word for chair, seat, throne
- the "Emperor's lodge" in the Hippodrome of Constantinople
- in Eastern Orthodox liturgy, kathisma, a division of the Psalter.
- Ecclesia Kathismatis, the Church of the Seat of Mary aka Church of the Kathisma or Old Kathisma, between Jerusalem and Bethlehem

== See also ==
- Cathedra
- Cathedral (disambiguation)
- Akathist
