= Serbian Orthodox Cathedral in Prizren =

Serbian Orthodox Cathedral in Prizren may refer to:

- Serbian Orthodox Cathedral of the Holy Mother of God in Prizren, former cathedral of the Serbian Orthodox Eparchy of Prizren, from 13th to 18th century; see Our Lady of Ljeviš Orthodox Cathedral
- Serbian Orthodox Cathedral of Saint George in Prizren, modern cathedral of the Serbian Orthodox Eparchy of Raška and Prizren, since 1887

== See also ==
- Cathedral (disambiguation)
