= Cathedral (disambiguation) =

A cathedral is a Christian church which contains the seat of a bishop.

Cathedral or The Cathedral may also refer to:

== Geography ==
- Cathedral, Colorado
- Cathedral Cavern (disambiguation), the name for several natural and industrial structures
- Cathedral Caves, a series of sea caves in southern New Zealand
- Cathedral Mansions Apartment Buildings, historic buildings in Washington, D.C.
- Cathedral Provincial Park and Protected Area, in British Columbia, Canada
- The Cathedral, a mountain in Utah, US
- Cathedral Peak

== Arts, entertainment, and media ==
=== Art and architecture ===
- Architecture of cathedrals and great churches
- The Cathedral (painting), or Katedrala, a 1912–13 painting by František Kupka
- The Cathedral (sculpture), Rodin

=== Films ===
- The Cathedral (2002 film), a short animated film by Tomasz Baginski, based on the Jacek Dukaj story
- La Cathédrale (film), a 2006 film
- The Cathedral (2021 film), an American drama film

=== Literature ===
- Cathedral (children's book), a 1973 illustrated book by David Macaulay
- Cathedral (novel), a 1981 book written by Nelson DeMille
- "Cathedral" (short story), a 1983 short story by Raymond Carver
  - Cathedral (short story collection), a 1983 book of short stories by Raymond Carver
- "The Cathedral" (Dukaj short story), a 2000 short story by Jacek Dukaj, adapted into a short film
- The Cathedral (Honchar novel), a 1968 novel by Oles Honchar
- The Cathedral (Huysmans novel), an 1898 novel by Joris-Karl Huysmans
- "The Cathedral" (play), a 1936 play by Hugh Walpole, an adaptation of his novel
- The Cathedral, a 1922 novel by Hugh Walpole
- The Cathedral and the Bazaar: Musings on Linux and Open Source by an Accidental Revolutionary (abbreviated CatB), Eric Raymond's 1997 essay and 1999 book on software methods, including the Cathedral model of software development
- Cathedral, a 2026 graphic novel by John Carpenter and Sandy King

=== Music ===
==== Groups ====
- Cathedral (band), a British metal band
- Cathedral Quartet, often known as simply The Cathedrals, a southern gospel singing quartet
- Cathedrals, a pop duo from San Francisco, California

==== Albums ====
- Cathedral (Castanets album), 2004
- Cathedral (Currensy album), 2015
- Cathedrals (album), a 2014 album by Tenth Avenue North

==== Songs ====
- "Cathedral", a 1982 song by Van Halen from Diver Down
- "Cathedral", a 1977 song by Crosby Stills and Nash from CSN
- "Cathedrals", a 1998 song by Jump, Little Children from Magazine
- "Cathedral", a 2025 song by Kesha from Period

=== Other uses in arts, entertainment, and media ===
- Cathedral (board game), a two-player abstract strategy board game
- Cathedral (TV series), a BBC documentary miniseries first broadcast in 2005

== Schools ==
- Cathedral High School (disambiguation)
- Cathedral School for Boys

== See also ==
- Catedral (disambiguation)
- Pro-cathedral
- Category:Cathedrals for a list of specific cathedrals
