= Hayden Peak (Utah) =

Mountain in Utah, United States

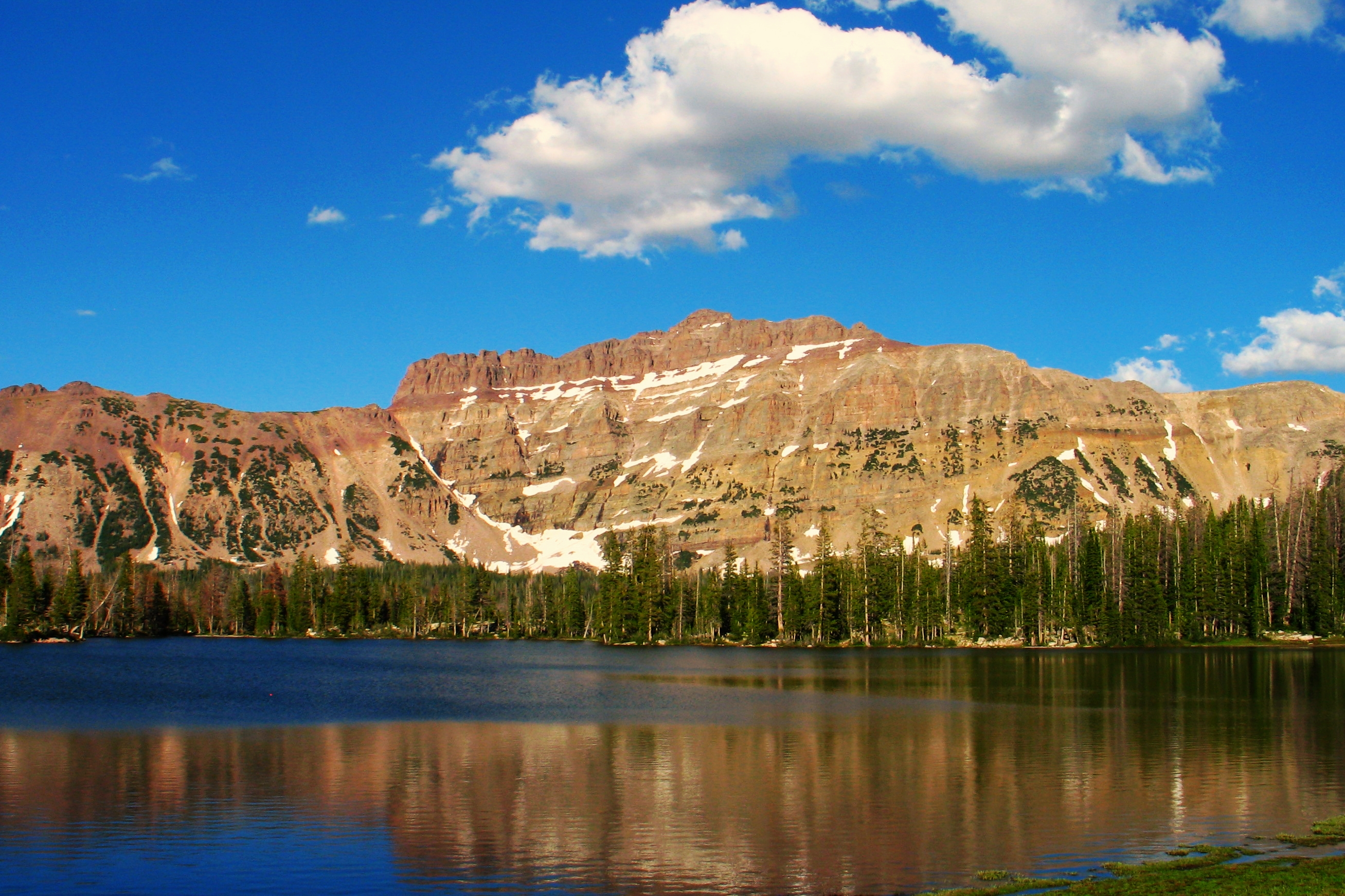
- The west face of Hayden Peak

Highest point
- Elevation: 12,484 ft (3,805 m)
- Prominence: 1,151 ft (351 m)
- Coordinates: 40°44′08″N 110°50′39″W

Naming
- Etymology: Ferdinand Vandeveer Hayden

Geography
- Location: Summit County, Utah, United States
- Parent range: Uinta Mountains
- Topo map: USGS Hayden Peak

Climbing
- Easiest route: Hike

Hayden Peak is a peak on the western edge of the High Uintas Wilderness in the Uinta-Wasatch-Cache National Forest in the western Uinta Mountain Range Summit County, Utah, United States.

== Description ==
The mountain is home to mountain goats, pika and many species of wildflowers. The peak is named for Ferdinand Hayden, an American geologist noted for his pioneering surveying expeditions of the Rocky Mountains in the late 19th century.

== See also ==
- List of mountains in Utah
