= Dead Horse Peak =

Mountain in Utah, United States

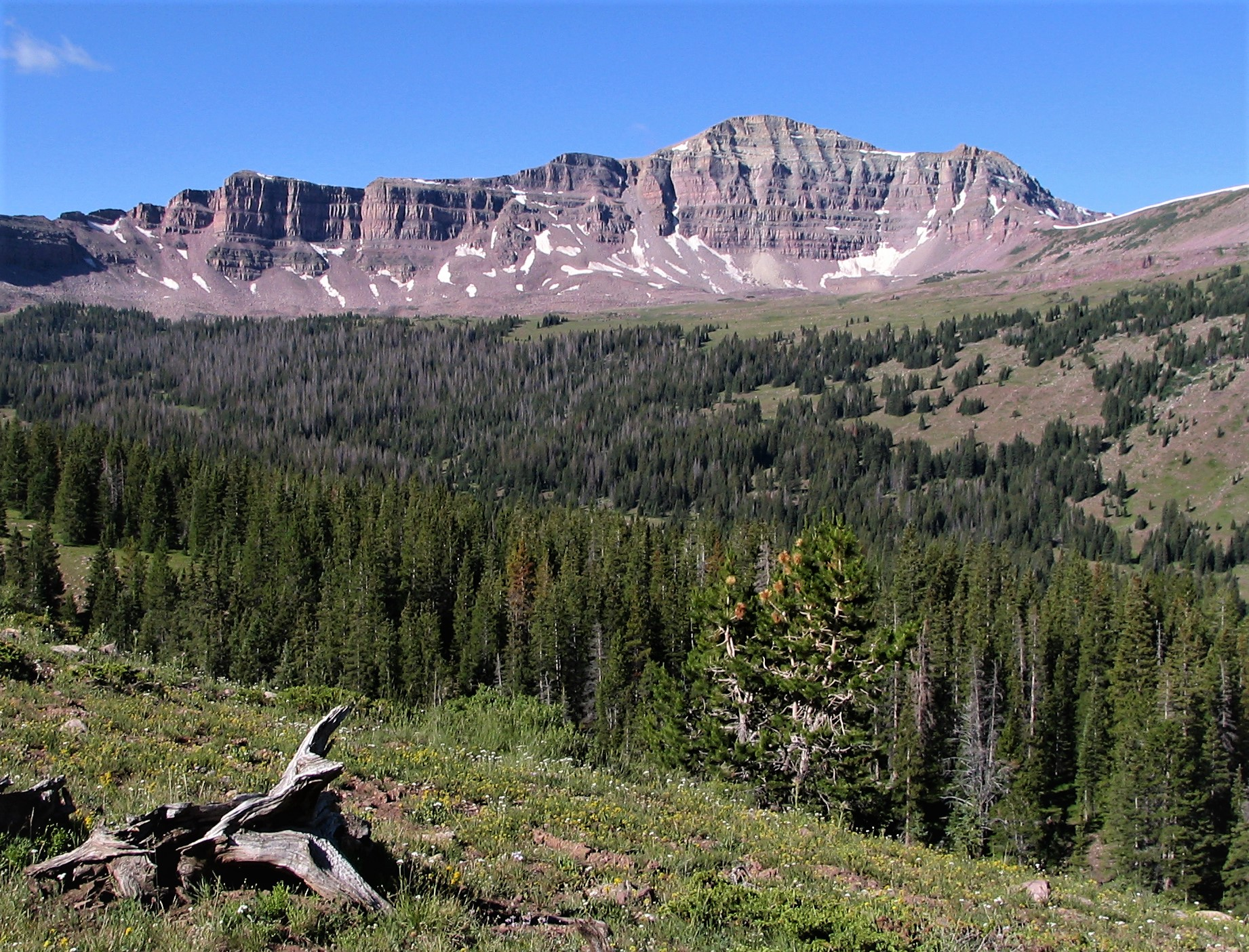
- Northeast aspect

Highest point
- Elevation: 12,642 ft (3,853 m)
- Prominence: 722 ft (220 m)
- Parent peak: Yard Peak (12,706 ft)
- Isolation: 1.24 mi (2.00 km)
- Coordinates: 40°44′35″N 110°41′34″W

Geography
- Location within Utah Location within the United States
- Location: High Uintas Wilderness
- Country: United States of America
- State: Utah
- County: Summit / Duchesne
- Parent range: Uinta Mountains; Rocky Mountains
- Topo map: USGS Explorer Peak

Geology
- Rock age: Neoproterozoic
- Rock type: Metasedimentary rock

Climbing
- Easiest route: class 2+ scrambling

Dead Horse Peak is a 12,642-foot elevation (3,853 m) mountain summit located on the common border that Duchesne County shares with Summit County in the U.S. state of Utah.

== Description ==
Dead Horse Peak is set within the High Uintas Wilderness on land managed by Ashley National Forest and Uinta-Wasatch-Cache National Forest. It is situated along the crest of the Uinta Mountains which are a subset of the Rocky Mountains, and it ranks as the 50th-highest summit in Utah. Topographic relief is significant as the southwest aspect rises 1,550 feet (470 meters) in less than one-half mile and the summit rises nearly 2,000 feet (610 meters) above Dead Horse Lake in one mile. Neighbors include Explorer Peak three miles to the southeast, Mount Beulah 3.5 miles north, and line parent Yard Peak is 1.5 mile northwest. Precipitation runoff from this mountain drains north to the Blacks Fork and south into headwaters of Rock Creek which is a tributary of the Duchesne River.

== Etymology ==
This mountain's toponym has not been officially adopted by the United States Board on Geographic Names, so it is not labelled on USGS maps, and will remain unofficial as long as the USGS policy of not adopting new toponyms in designated wilderness areas remains in effect. The peak is named in association with Dead Horse Lake and Dead Horse Pass which are both one mile east of the peak, and are both officially named.

== Climate ==
Based on the Köppen climate classification, Dead Horse Peak is located in a subarctic climate zone with cold snowy winters and mild summers. Tundra climate characterizes the summit and highest slopes.

== Gallery ==
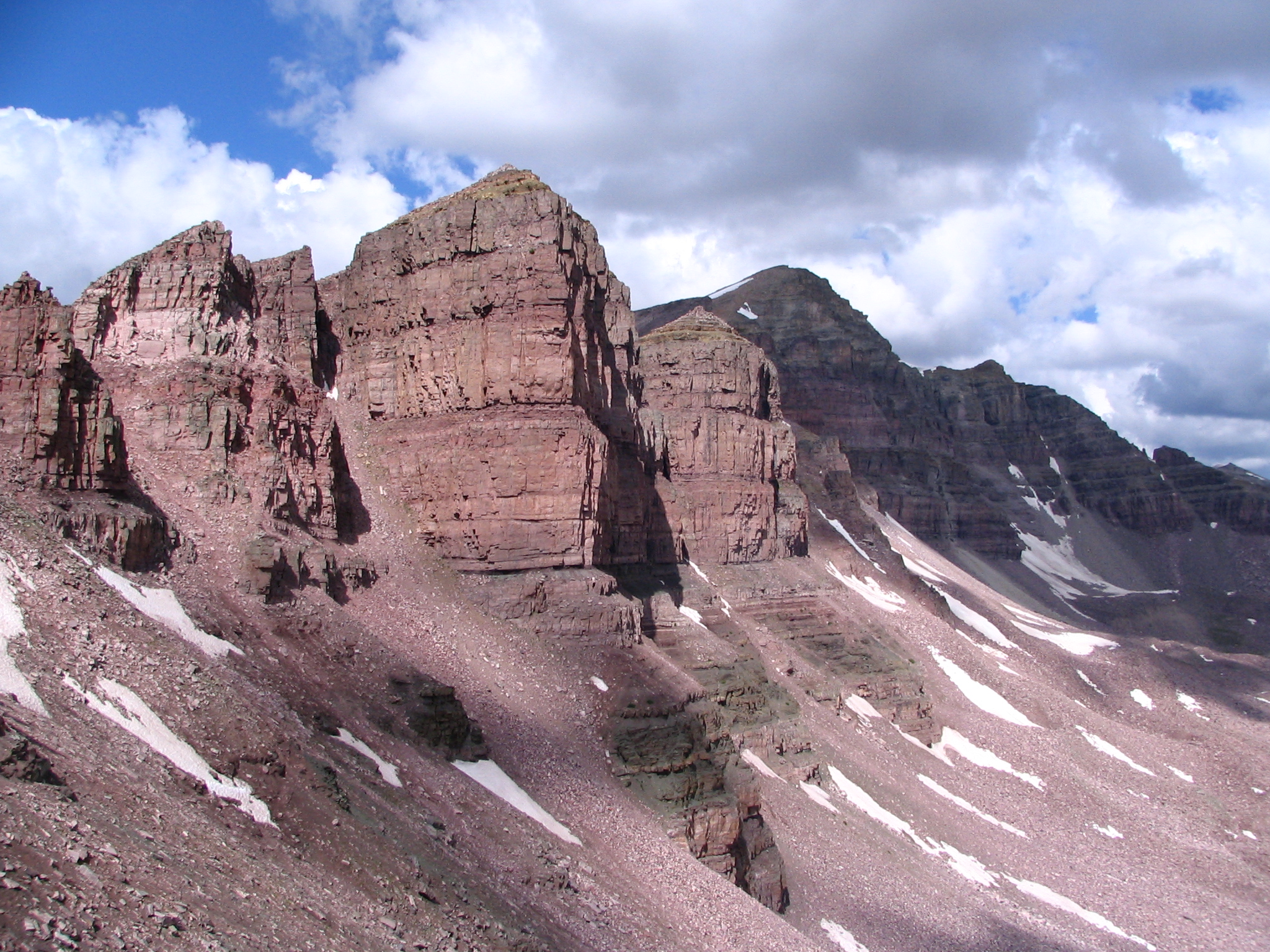
East aspect of Dead Horse Peak (shaded, right of center) seen from the trail between Dead Horse Lake and Dead Horse Pass

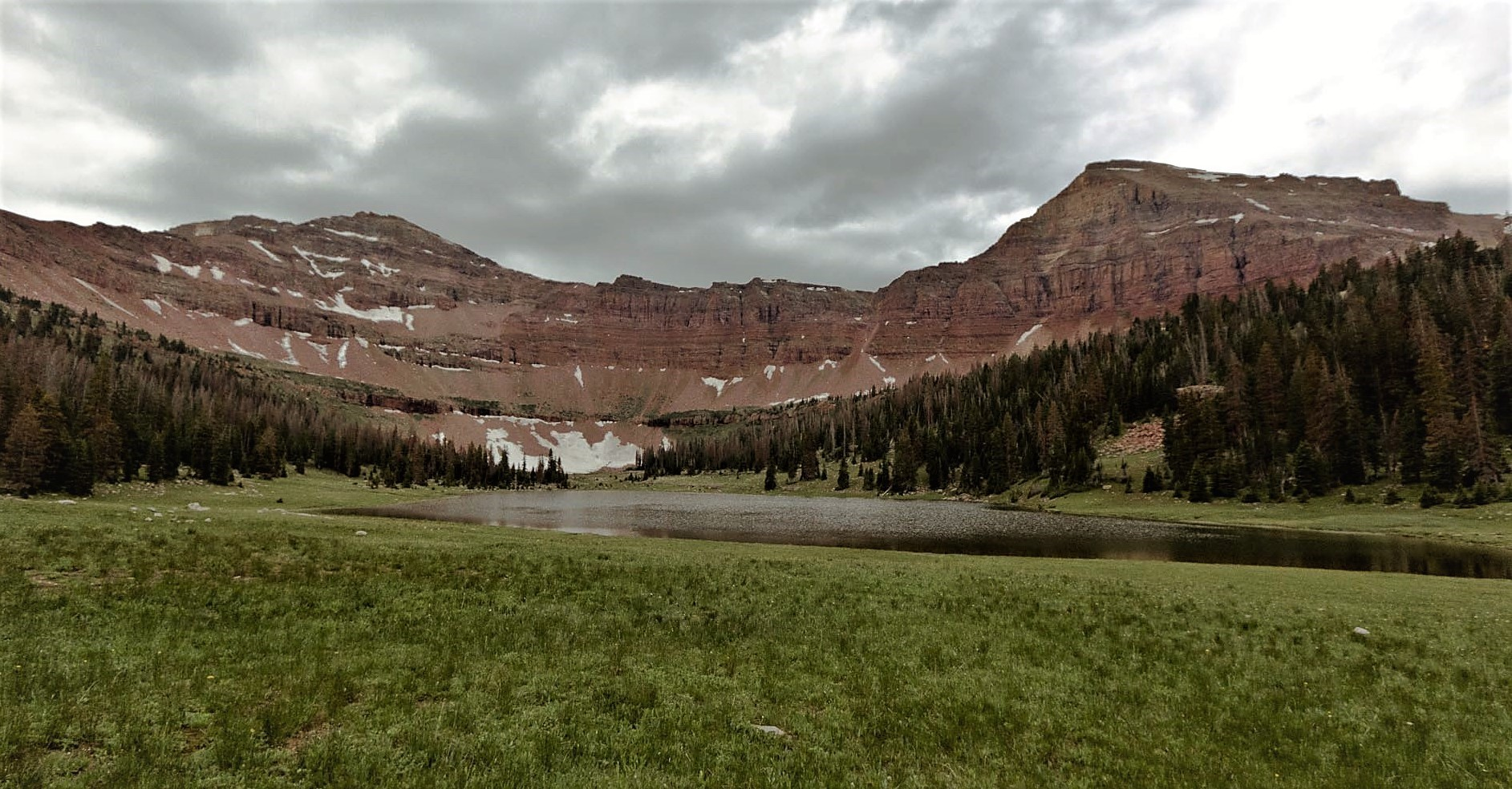
Dead Horse Peak (left) with parent Yard Peak (right) from Allsop Lake

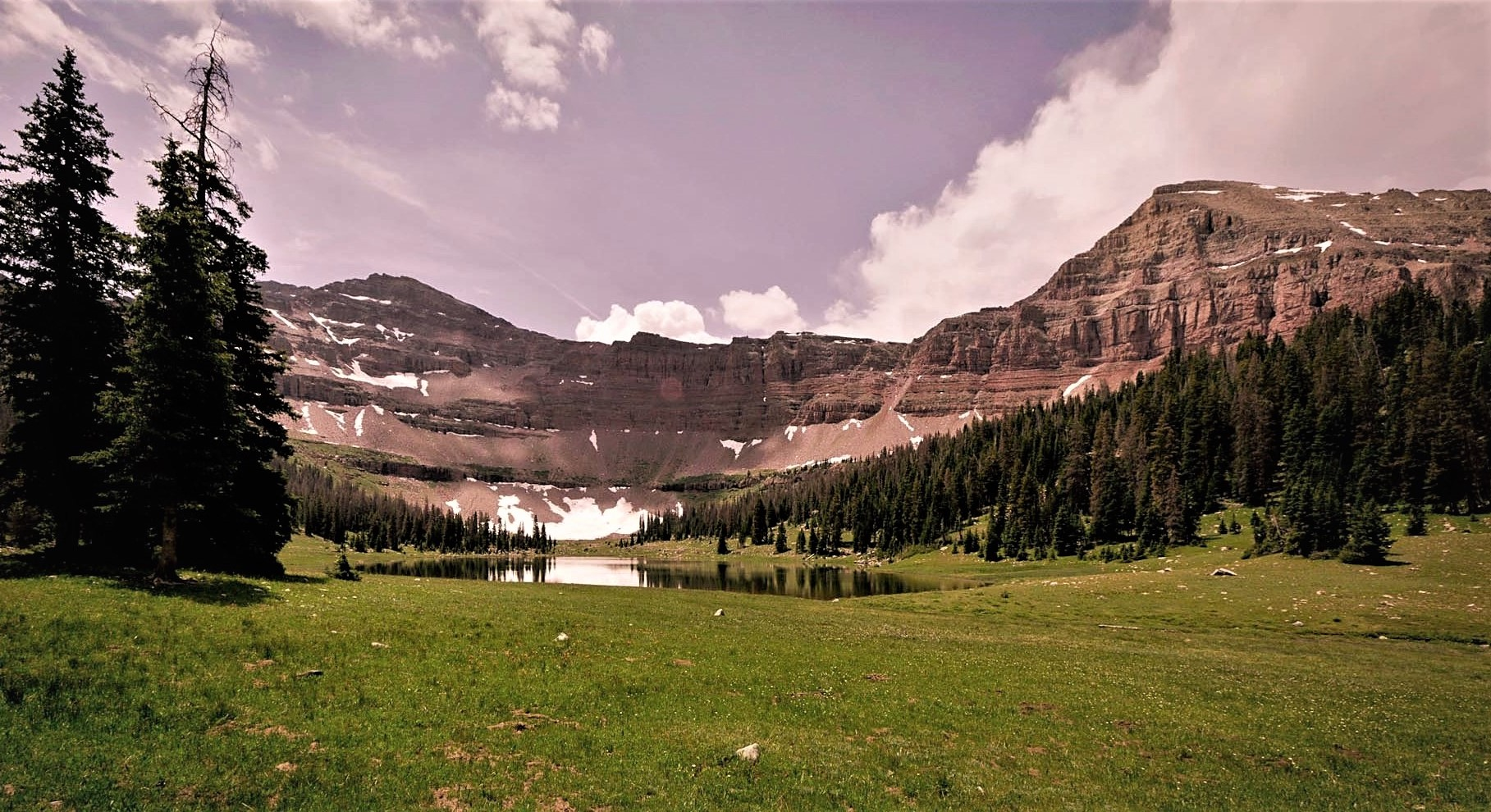
Dead Horse Peak (left), Allsop Lake, Yard Peak (right)

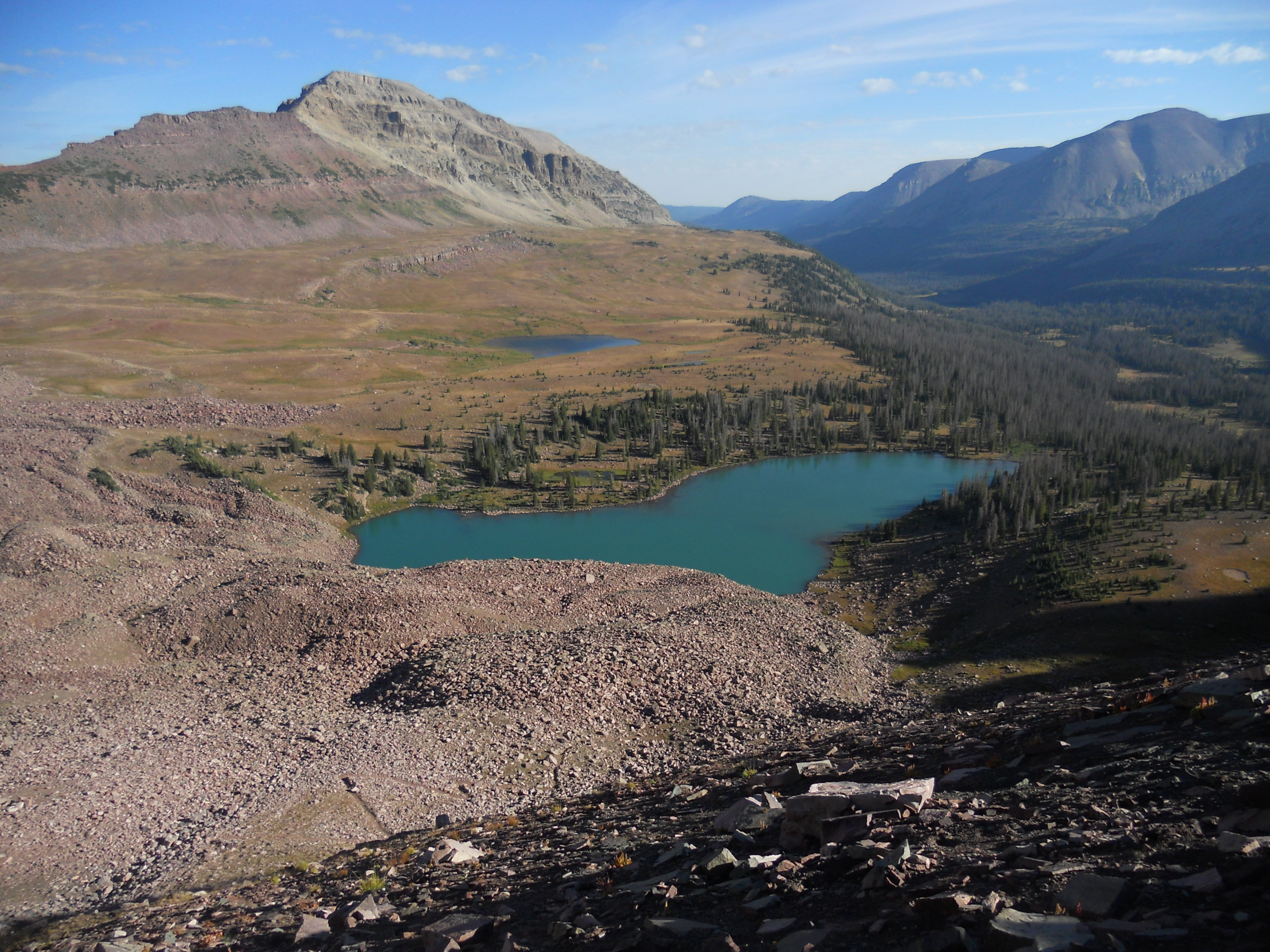
Dead Horse Lake as viewed from Dead Horse Pass

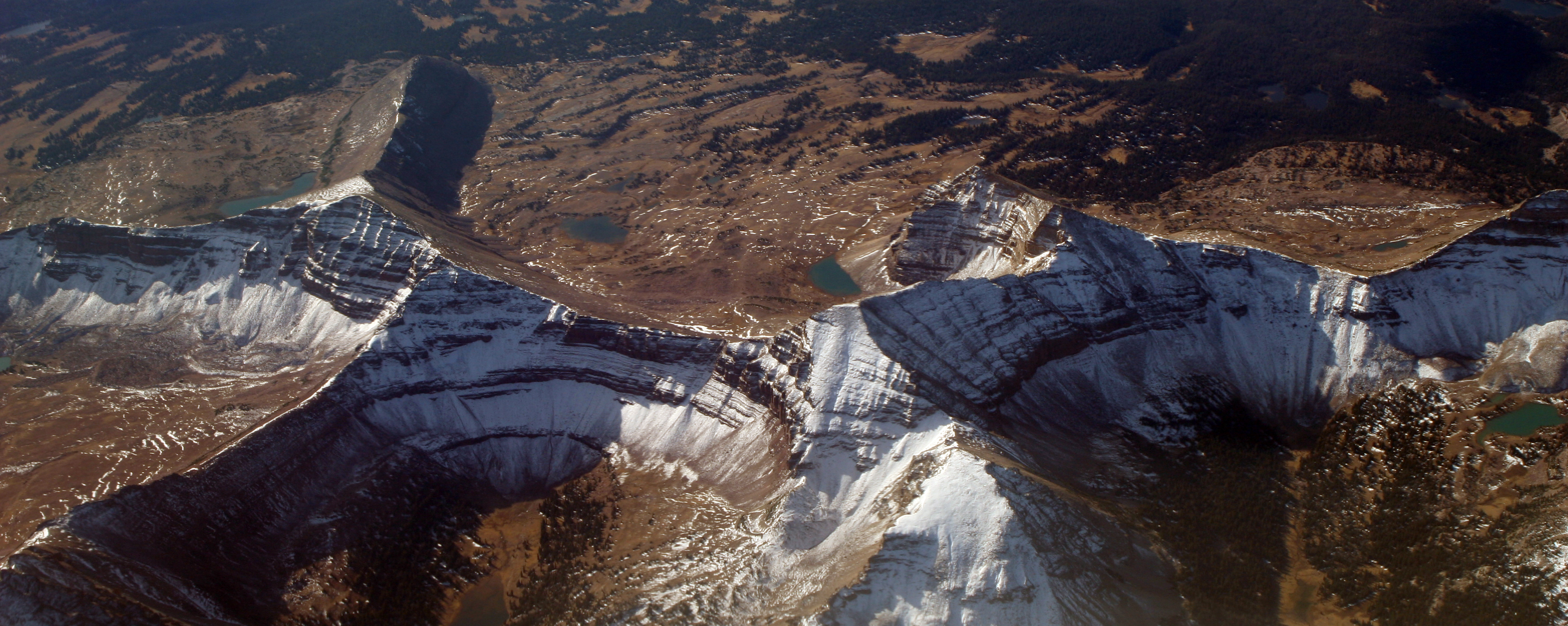
Dead Horse Peak (left) and Yard Peak (right of center) viewed from the north from airliner.

== See also ==
- Geology of the Uinta Mountains
