= Harrikrisna Anenden =

Mauritian film director

- Born: 1947 (age 78–79)
- Education: London Film School
- Occupation: Film director
- Spouse: Ananda Devi

Harrikrisna Anenden (born 1947) is a Mauritian film director.

== Biography ==
Anenden was born in Mauritius in 1947. He began taking photographs at age 12 and later moved to London to study medical photography. He graduated from the London Film School and studied film criticism at the University of London. Anenden has worked as a photographer and lab technician for several employers including the University of Mauritius. In 1980, he made his film debut with L’Argile et la Flamme. For many years, Anenden has worked for the World Health Organization (WHO). He has directed several documentaries for the WHO, including Blood, the Gift of Life in 1999 and Facing Up to AIDS in 2000.

Anenden directed La Cathédrale in 2006. The film follows Lina, a young woman in the capital city of Port Louis who meets a photographer enamored with her. However, she rejects him on the steps of a Catholic cathedral. "Cinema Escapist" named it the best Mauritian film. Anenden chose to film Lina's house at his childhood home.

In 2012, Anenden co-directed Les enfants de Troumaron alongside his son Sharvan Anenden. It follows the lives of four adolescent Mauritians as they struggle to survive in one of the poorest areas on the island, with little more than violence and prostitution. Les enfants de Troumaron examines themes of the wealth disparity and communication problems. The film received the award for Best Film at the 2014 Africa Movie Academy Awards, and he earned the Best Director award. It was also named Best Film at the Panafrican Film and Television Festival of Ouagadougou (FESPACO).

Anenden lives in Ferney-Voltaire, France, on the Swiss border. He is married to the Mauritian writer Ananda Devi Nirsimloo.

== Partial filmography ==
- 1980: L’Argile et la Flamme
- 1999: Blood, the Gift of Life
- 2000: Facing Up to AIDS
- 2006: La Cathédrale
- 2012: Les enfants de Troumaron
- 2016: Un sari sans fin
