= Catedral =

Catedral may refer to:

- Catedral (Buenos Aires Underground), a station
- Catedral (district), a district of the San José canton, in the San José province of Costa Rica
- Cerro Catedral, a mountain and ski resort in the Andes of southwestern Argentina
- Cerro Catedral (Chile), a mountain in Torres del Paine National Park
- Cerro Catedral (Uruguay), the highest peak in Uruguay
- Catedral, a copper mining prospect in the Andes of Central Chile

== See also ==
- Cathedral (disambiguation)
