= Tank Hollow Fire =

2017 fire in Uinta-Wasatch-Cache National Forest, Utah, United States

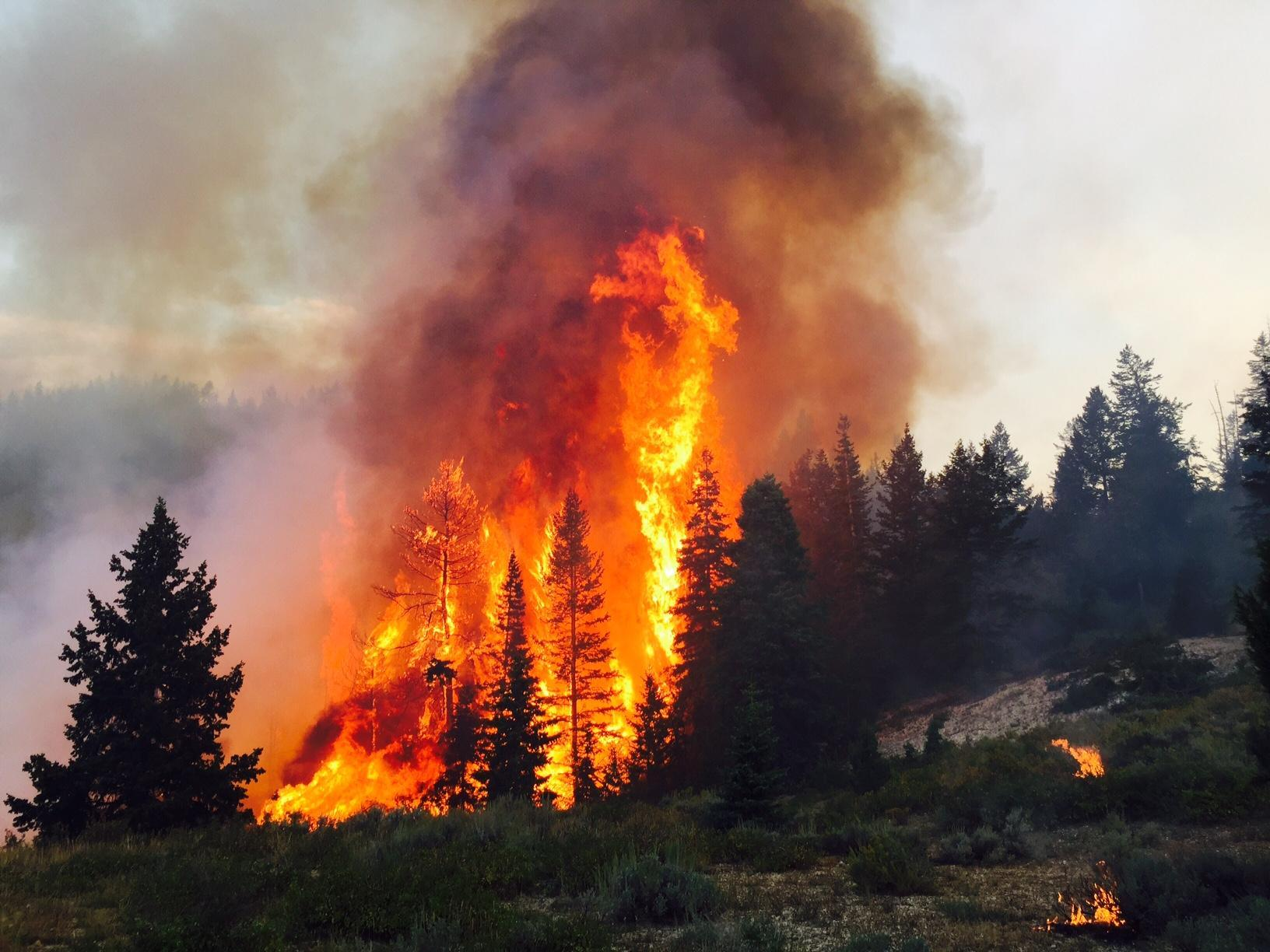
- Northeast portion of Tank Hollow Fire burning August 29
- Date: August 11, 2017 – December 5, 2017
- Location: Uinta-Wasatch-Cache National Forest, Utah, United States
- Coordinates: 39.994°N 111.316°W

Statistics
- Burned area: 11,067 acres (45 km^{2})

Ignition
- Cause: Lightning

Map
- Location of fire in Utah.

The Tank Hollow Fire was a fire that burned in the Uinta-Wasatch-Cache National Forest in Utah in the United States. The fire was started by a lightning strike on August 11, 2017. Since then, it burned a total of 11,067 acres (45 km^{2}). The fire threatened homes along US Route 40. It was contained on December 5, 2017.

== Events ==
=== August ===
The Tank Hollow Fire was first reported on August 11, 2017 at 9:45 AM at Sheep Creek in the Uinta-Wasatch-Cache National Forest, approximately 19 miles east of Spanish Fork, Utah. The fire was started by a lightning strike and was fueled by timber, grass, and brush, including juniper, sage, mixed conifer, and Douglas fir. By August 27, the fire had burned 3,500 acres (14 km^{2}) and was 40 percent contained. Numerous campgrounds were closed, as well as five forest service roads. The next day, the fire expanded to the Tie Fork drainage and 220 fire personnel were fighting the fire.

On August 29, the fire had grown to 4,172 acres (17 km^{2}) and its containment was lowered to 20 percent. Dozer lines were created from Corral Canyon to Tie Fork Rd. to keep the fire from expanding north towards transmission lines and east beyond Tie Fork Rd. The fire creeped back into Sheep Creek and moved south east towards US Route 40, threatening homes. Helicopters were bringing water from Strawberry Reservoir, but were stopped as temporary water resources were created in the fire area, reducing turnaround time. Fire activity increased due to a spot fire near Soberville Hollow which then expanded into Baker Canyon. Heavy winds forced fire crews to leave Corral Canyon due to safety reasons. On August 30, crews continued to help keep the fire from Tie Fork Rd., using the road itself, natural barriers and hand digging. Cloud cover helped slow the growth of the fire. Upper Tie Fork Single Track trail was closed.

=== September ===
By September 1, the fire was 40% contained at 4,710 acres (19 km^{2}). Cooler and wet weather helped dampen the fire, creating smoldering in many areas. The fire did continue to move northeast in Soberville and Baker Canyons. Dozers were used to create fire lines and a contingency plan was created to protect areas east of Tie Fork. The fire grew, moving down into Baker Canyon, burning debris and "improving overall forest health," according to the US Forest Service. The containment line was widened by controlled burning. A Temporary Flight Restriction was put in place earlier during the fire and during late August and early September, there were six airspace intrusions due to uncleared pilots flying into the area. The fire had grown to 5,000 acres (20 km^{2}) by September 4.

The fire grew to over 7,000 acres (28 km^{2}) by the morning of September 6. Crews made major progress at containment using low intensity backing fire to control the main fire, aided by helicopters, hand crews and hotshot crews. Letting the fire burn in contained areas burned away hazardous fuels and in the long term would improve forest health. By September 8, the fire was over 50% contained and had grown to 9,159 acres (37 km^{2}).

By September 15, the forest incident commanders reported being "please with the fire effects," and that the anticipate that the fire "will improve Forest health and aspen regeneration which will develop better habitat for wildlife." Unicorn Campground and a number of roads reopened, with select roads and trails remaining closed do the potential for mudslides or trees that can fall down.

== December ==
The fire was contained on December 5, 2017.
