= Ananda Devi =

Mauritian writer

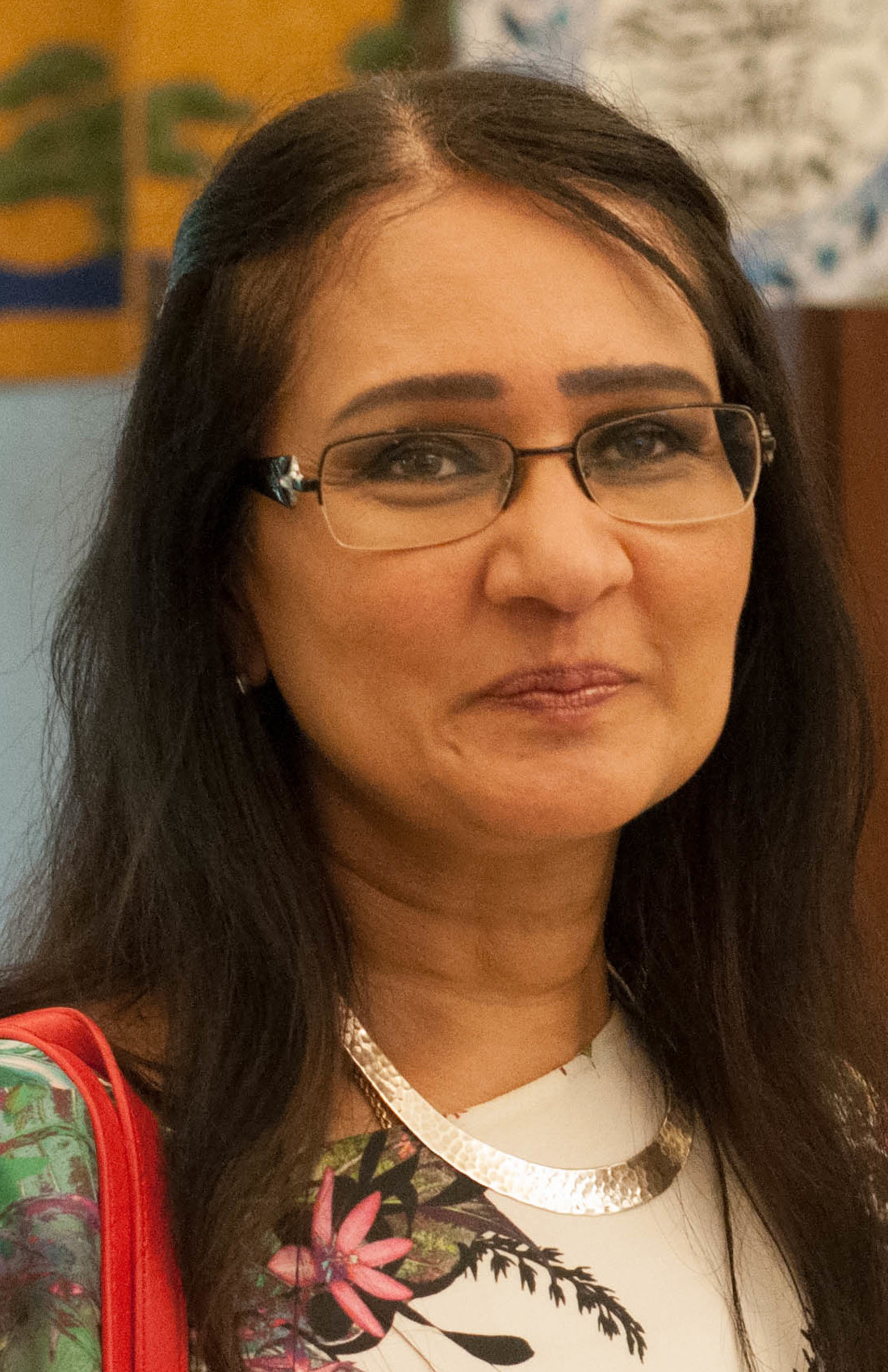
- Devi in 2016
- Born: Ananda Devi Nirsimloo; March 23, 1957 (age 69); Trois-Boutiques, Grand Port District, Mauritius
- Education: School of Oriental and African Studies
- Occupation: Author
- Spouse: Harrikrisna Anenden
- Writing career
- Language: French
- Notable awards: Neustadt Prize; Prix des cinq continents de la Francophonie; Prix Femina des lycéens

Ananda Devi Nirsimloo-Anenden, also known as Ananda Devi, (born March 23, 1957) is a francophone Mauritian author. She is the 2024 recipient of the Neustadt Prize, known as the "American Nobel."

== Biography ==
Ananda Devi Nirsimloo was born in Trois-Boutiques, a village in Grand Port District, Mauritius. Her father Balgopal and her mother Saraswaty were Indo-Mauritians of Telugu ancestry. She grew up with her two sisters Soorya and Salonee. At the age of 15, she won a prize in a Radio France Internationale short story competition. She went on to study at the School of Oriental and African Studies in London, where she obtained a PhD in Social Anthropology. In 1977, she published her début collection of short stories, Solstices. After spending several years in Brazzaville in the Congo, she moved to Ferney-Voltaire in 1989, the same year in which her first novel Rue la poudrière was published. This was followed by more novels: Le Voile de Draupadi in 1993, L'Arbre fouet in 1997 and, in 2000, Moi, l'interdite, which received the Prix Radio France du Livre de l'Océan Indien.

Her novel Eve de ses décombres won the Prix des cinq continents de la Francophonie in 2006, as well as several other prizes, and was adapted for the cinema by Sharvan Anenden and Harrikrisna Anenden. She has since won other literary prizes, including the Prix Louis Guilloux for Le Sari vert, the Prix Ouest France Étonnants Voyageurs for Manger l'autre, and, the Prix Femina des lycéens. for Le rire des déesses. For the totality of her work, she received the Prix du Rayonnement de la langue et de la littérature française of the Académie française, and in 2010 she was named Chevalier des Arts et des Lettres by the French Government. In 2023, she was awarded both the Prix de la langue française and the Neustadt Prize, cementing her reputation as a leading voice in French and world letters.

Devi is married to the film director Harrikrisna Anenden.

== Works ==
- Solstices, short-story collection (1977)
- Le poids des êtres, short-story collection (1987)
  - English translation "Lakshmi's Gift" by D.S. Blair in The Heinemann Book of African Women's Writing (1993)
- Rue la Poudrière, novel (1988)
- Le Voile de Draupadi, novel (1993)
- La fin des pierres et des âges, short-story collection (1993)
- L'Arbre-fouet, novel (1997)
- Moi, L'Interdite, novel (2000)
- Pagli, novel (2001)
  - English translation by Ananda Devi (Rupa Publishers, 2007)
- Soupir, novel (2002)
- La Vie de Joséphin le fou, novel (2003)
- Le Long Désir, poetry collection (2003)
  - The Long Desire, English translation by Rachel Wysocki (2014)
- Ève de ses décombres, novel (2006), winner of the Prix des cinq continents de la francophonie, the Prix RFO du livre, and the Prix Télévision Suisse Romande
  - Eve Out of Her Ruins , English translation by Jeffrey Zuckerman (Deep Vellum, 2016; Les Fugitives, 2016; Speaking Tiger, 2017)
- Indian Tango, novel (2007)
  - Indian Tango, English translation by Jean Anderson (Host Publications, 2011; Random House India, 2013)
- Le sari vert, novel (2009), winner of the Prix Louis-Guilloux
- Quand la nuit consent à me parler, poetry collection (2011)
  - When the Night Agrees to Speak to Me, English translation by Kazim Ali (HarperCollins India, 2020; Deep Vellum, 2022)
- Les hommes qui me parlent, autobiographical novel (2011)
- Les Jours vivants, novel (2013)
  - The Living Days, English translation by Jeffrey Zuckerman (Feminist Press, 2019; Les Fugitives, 2020)
- L'ambassadeur triste, short-story collection (2015)
  - English translation of "The Sad Ambassador" by Namrata Poddar published in collaboration with the Asian-American Writers' Workshop (2015)
  - English translation of "The Orchid" by Ananda Devi published as part of the 2015 PEN World Voices Online Anthology (2015)
  - English translation of "Kari Disan" by Jeffrey Zuckerman published as part of Words without Borders' May 2017 issue (2017)
- Ceux du large, trilingual poetry collection (2017)
- L'illusion poétique, short-story collection (2017)
  - English translation of "Weaving Dreams" by Jean Anderson published as part of Words without Borders' May 2012 issue (2012)
- Manger l'autre, novel (2018)
- Danser sur tes Braises suivi de Six décennies, poetry collection (2020)
- Fardo, short-story collection (2020)
- Le Rire des déesses, novel (2021)
- Deux malles et une marmite, autobiographical novel (2021)
- Sylvia P., autobiographical essay on Plath and Hughes (2022)
- Le Jour des cameléons, novel (2023)
