= La Cathédrale (film) =

- Directed by: Harrikrisna Anenden
- Screenplay by: Ananda Devi
- Produced by: Cine Qua Non Ltd, Paul Turcotte
- Starring: Ingrid Blackburn, Darma Mootien, Geeta Mootien, Gaston Valayden, Ashwin Anenden, Yves Herman
- Cinematography: Donald Delorme
- Edited by: Ursula Wilson
- Music by: Stéphanie Loewenbruck
- Release date: 2006
- Running time: 78'
- Country: Mauritius

La Cathédrale (The cathedral) is a 2006 film directed by Harrikrisna Anenden.

== Synopsis ==
A day in the life of Lina, a young girl from Port-Louis, capital of Mauritius, seen through the eyes of the cathedral. A day that will not be the same as the rest when an unexpected meeting brings Lina face to face with reality and she is forced her to make a choice.

== Awards ==
- CamboFest - 2007
