= Cathedral Cavern =

Several natural structures are named Cathedral Cavern:

== Australia ==
- Cathedral Cavern, Queensland

== Spain ==
- Cathedral Cavern, Minorca

== United Kingdom ==
- Cathedral Cavern, Lake District
- Cathedral Cavern, Llanfair, Wales

== United States ==
- Cathedral Caverns State Park, in Woodville, Alabama

== See also ==
- Cathedral Caves, a series of sea caves in southern New Zealand
