= Cathedral High School =

Cathedral High School may refer to:

- Cathedral High School (Boston)
- Cathedral High School (Texas)
- Cathedral Carmel High School (Lafayette, Louisiana)
- Cathedral High School (Springfield, Massachusetts)
- Cathedral High School (Los Angeles)
- Cathedral High School (Detroit, Michigan)
- Cathedral High School (New Ulm, Minnesota)
- Cathedral High School (St. Cloud, Minnesota)
- Cathedral High School (Natchez, Mississippi)
- Cathedral High School (New York City)
- Cathedral High School (Indianapolis)
- Cathedral Catholic High School (San Diego, California)
- Cathedral City High School (Cathedral City, California)
- Cathedral High School (Hamilton, Ontario)
- Cathedral High School (Omaha, Nebraska), defunct high school, which was affiliated with St. Cecilia Cathedral
- Cathedral High School, Bangalore
- St. John's Cathedral High School (Milwaukee, Wisconsin)
