= High Uintas Wilderness =

Wilderness area in Utah, United States

- IUCN category Ib (wilderness area)
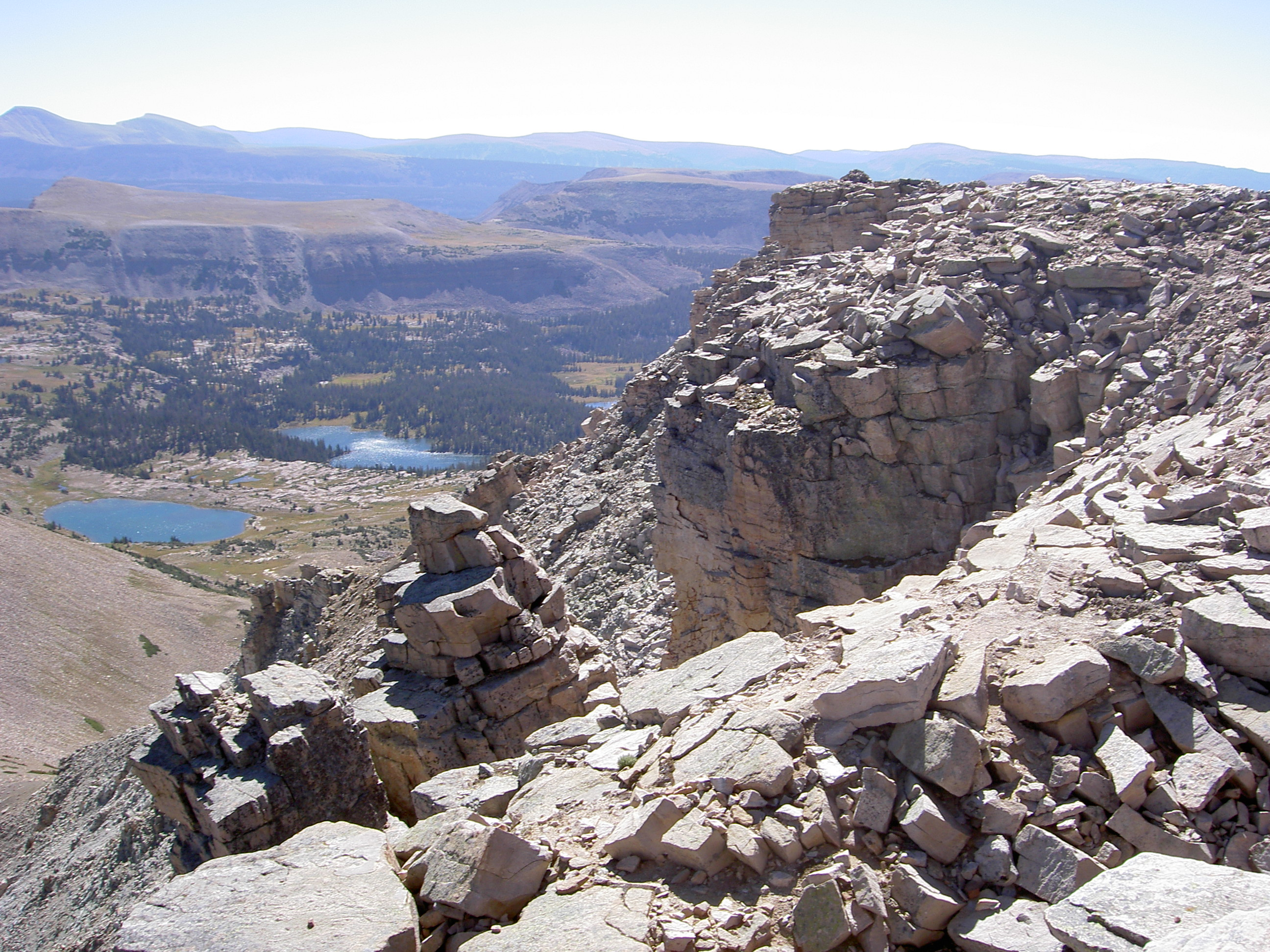
- Naturalist Basin, in the High Uintas Wilderness

- Location within Utah Location within the United States
- Location: Duchesne / Summit counties, Utah, USA
- Nearest city: Kamas, Utah
- Coordinates: 40.75°N 110.50°W
- Area: 456,705 acres (1,848 km^{2})
- Established: September 18, 1984
- Governing body: U.S. Forest Service

The High Uintas Wilderness /juːˈɪntəz/ is a wilderness area located in northeastern Utah, United States. The wilderness covers the Uinta Mountains, encompassing parts of Duchesne and Summit counties. Designated as a wilderness in 1984, the area is located within parts of Ashley National Forest and Uinta-Wasatch-Cache National Forest, managed by the U.S. Forest Service. The highest peak in Utah, Kings Peak, lies within the wilderness area along with some of Utah's highest peaks, particularly those over 13,000 feet (4,000 meters).

Mirror Lake Highway is closed in the winter, usually opening annually near Memorial Day. Winter access is allowed for snowmobiling (though snowmobiling is not allowed within the Wilderness Area), cross-country skiing, and snowshoeing.

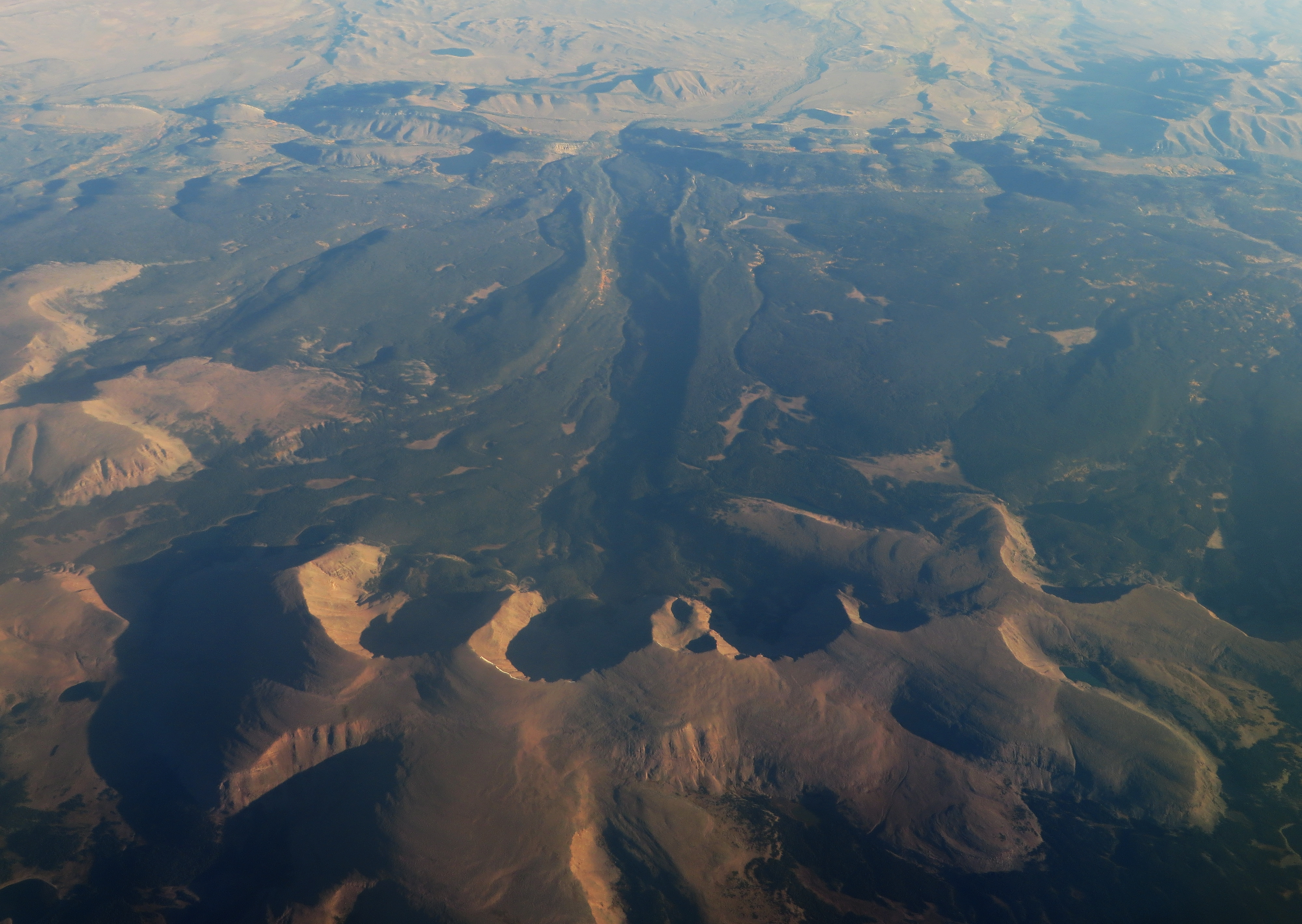
Summit ridge, High Uintas. Note series of glacial cirques gnawed into the ridge.

== In popular culture ==
Despite being filmed in Canada, the area is specifically referred to in, and the setting for most of, the 2017 film The Mountain Between Us.

== Climate ==
There is a SNOTEL weather station near Brown Duck Lake, in the southeast of the High Uintas Wilderness. Brown Duck has a subalpine climate (Köppen Dfc).

Climate data for Brown Duck, Utah, 1991–2020 normals, 1986-2020 extremes: 10600ft (3231m)
Month	Jan	Feb	Mar	Apr	May	Jun	Jul	Aug	Sep	Oct	Nov	Dec	Year
Record high °F (°C)	56 (13)	67 (19)	74 (23)	70 (21)	73 (23)	78 (26)	83 (28)	86 (30)	79 (26)	69 (21)	63 (17)	51 (11)	86 (30)
Mean maximum °F (°C)	46.7 (8.2)	47.9 (8.8)	54.9 (12.7)	59.6 (15.3)	64.8 (18.2)	70.7 (21.5)	76.7 (24.8)	74.0 (23.3)	68.9 (20.5)	60.2 (15.7)	52.4 (11.3)	44.2 (6.8)	77.4 (25.2)
Mean daily maximum °F (°C)	30.4 (−0.9)	33.3 (0.7)	40.9 (4.9)	45.8 (7.7)	52.6 (11.4)	60.6 (15.9)	68.0 (20.0)	65.8 (18.8)	57.6 (14.2)	47.0 (8.3)	36.3 (2.4)	28.5 (−1.9)	47.2 (8.5)
Daily mean °F (°C)	19.1 (−7.2)	20.1 (−6.6)	26.3 (−3.2)	31.3 (−0.4)	39.5 (4.2)	46.4 (8.0)	55.3 (12.9)	53.5 (11.9)	46.0 (7.8)	35.8 (2.1)	25.2 (−3.8)	18.0 (−7.8)	34.7 (1.5)
Mean daily minimum °F (°C)	7.9 (−13.4)	7.0 (−13.9)	11.8 (−11.2)	16.8 (−8.4)	26.4 (−3.1)	35.4 (1.9)	42.5 (5.8)	41.1 (5.1)	34.2 (1.2)	24.6 (−4.1)	14.0 (−10.0)	7.6 (−13.6)	22.4 (−5.3)
Mean minimum °F (°C)	−10.5 (−23.6)	−10.7 (−23.7)	−5.0 (−20.6)	0.3 (−17.6)	11.5 (−11.4)	23.7 (−4.6)	35.0 (1.7)	33.5 (0.8)	21.8 (−5.7)	7.6 (−13.6)	−5.6 (−20.9)	−11.1 (−23.9)	−16.2 (−26.8)
Record low °F (°C)	−20 (−29)	−29 (−34)	−14 (−26)	−13 (−25)	−1 (−18)	15 (−9)	26 (−3)	24 (−4)	6 (−14)	−11 (−24)	−21 (−29)	−27 (−33)	−29 (−34)
Average precipitation inches (mm)	3.29 (84)	3.33 (85)	3.02 (77)	3.37 (86)	2.75 (70)	1.53 (39)	1.97 (50)	2.32 (59)	2.79 (71)	3.07 (78)	2.63 (67)	3.21 (82)	33.28 (848)
Source 1: XMACIS2
Source 2: NOAA (Precipitation)

== See also ==
- Ashley National Forest
- Uinta Highline Trail
- List of U.S. Wilderness Areas
- National Wilderness Preservation System
- Uinta-Wasatch-Cache National Forest
- Wilderness Act
