= Wasatch–Cache National Forest =

National Forest in Idaho, Utah, and Wyoming in the United States

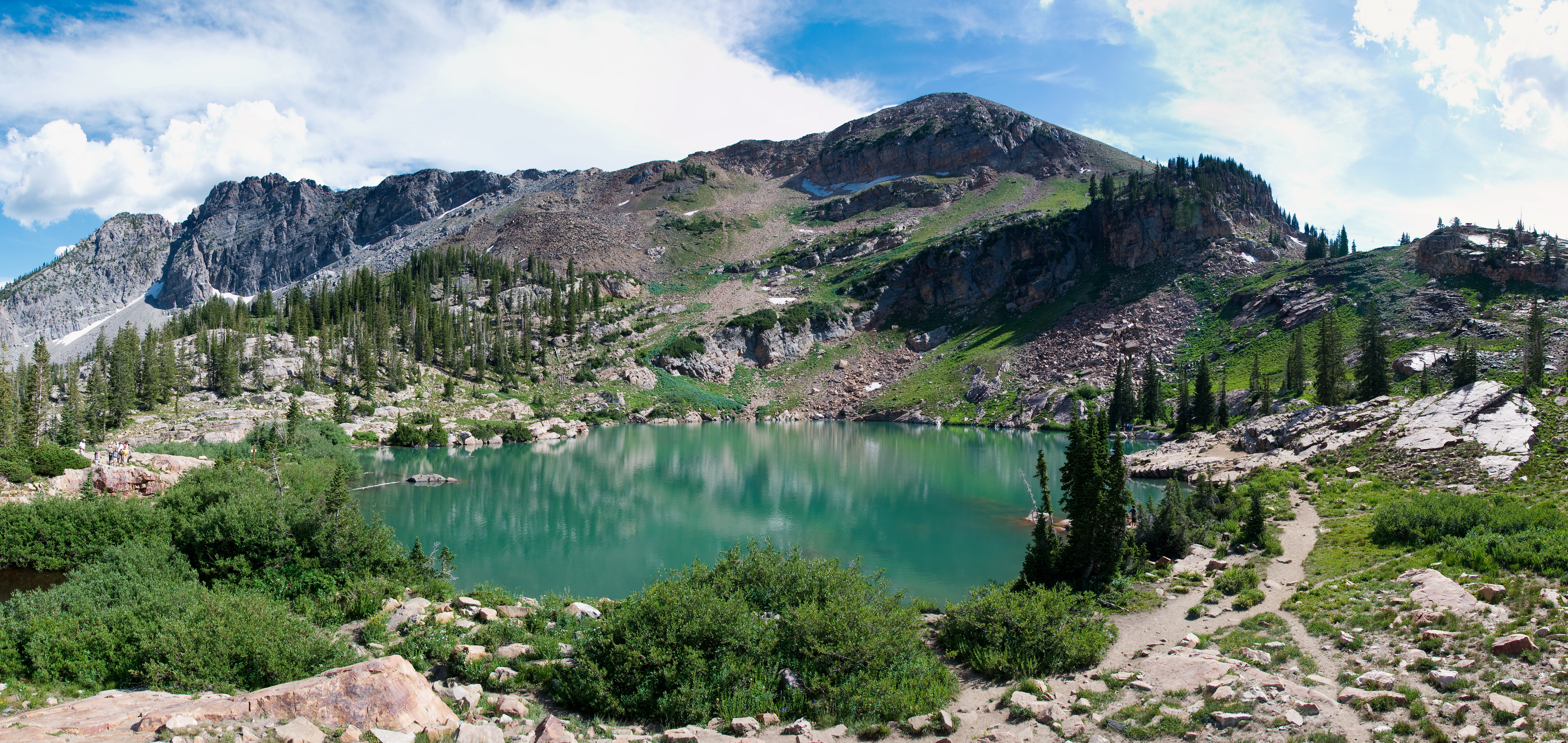
- Cecret Lake in Wasatch–Cache National Forest

- Location within the United States Location within Utah
- Location: Utah / Idaho / Wyoming, United States
- Nearest city: South Jordan, Utah
- Coordinates: 41.650°N 112.015°W
- Area: 1,607,177 acres (6,504.01 km^{2})
- Established: August 16, 1906
- Governing body: U.S. Forest Service
- Website: Uinta–Wasatch–Cache National Forest

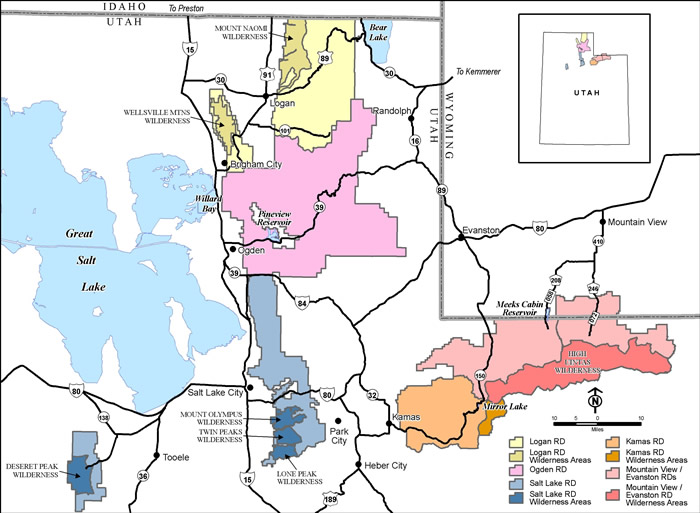
Map of wilderness areas in the Wasatch–Cache National Forest

Wasatch–Cache National Forest is a United States national forest located primarily in northern Utah (81.23%), with smaller parts extending into southeastern Idaho (16.42%) and southwestern Wyoming (2.35%). The name is derived from the Ute word Wasatch for a low place in high mountains, and the French word Cache meaning to hide. The term cache originally referred to fur trappers, the first Europeans to visit the land. The Wasatch–Cache National Forest boundaries include 1,607,177 acres (6,504.01 km^{2}) of land.

Wasatch–Cache was headquartered in downtown Salt Lake City, Utah until August 2007 when its management was combined with the Uinta National Forest and is currently being managed as the Uinta–Wasatch–Cache National Forest. The merged forest is based in South Jordan, Utah. The Kamas Ranger District was merged with the Uinta National Forest's Heber Ranger District in Heber City. With the newly included Uinta National Forest, the forest will expand to 2,487,896 acres (10,068.16 km^{2}).

The Cache National Forest portion is located in northern Utah and southern Idaho. It has a land area of 701,453 acres (1,096 sq mi, or 2,838.7 km^{2}). In descending order of land area it is located in parts of Cache, Bear Lake, Franklin, Weber, Rich, Box Elder, Caribou, and Morgan counties. (Bear Lake, Franklin, and Caribou counties are in Idaho, and all the rest in Utah.) There are local ranger district offices located in Logan and Ogden.

The Wasatch National Forest portion is in northeastern Utah and southwestern Wyoming. It has a land area of 905,724 acres (1,415.2 sq mi, or 3,365.3 km^{2}). In descending order of land area it is located in parts of Summit, Tooele, Salt Lake, Davis, Uinta, Duchesne, Wasatch, Morgan, Utah, Weber, and Juab counties. (Uinta County is in Wyoming, and all the rest is in Utah.) There are local ranger district offices located in Evanston and Mountain View in Wyoming, and in Kamas, and Salt Lake City in Utah.

== Wilderness areas ==
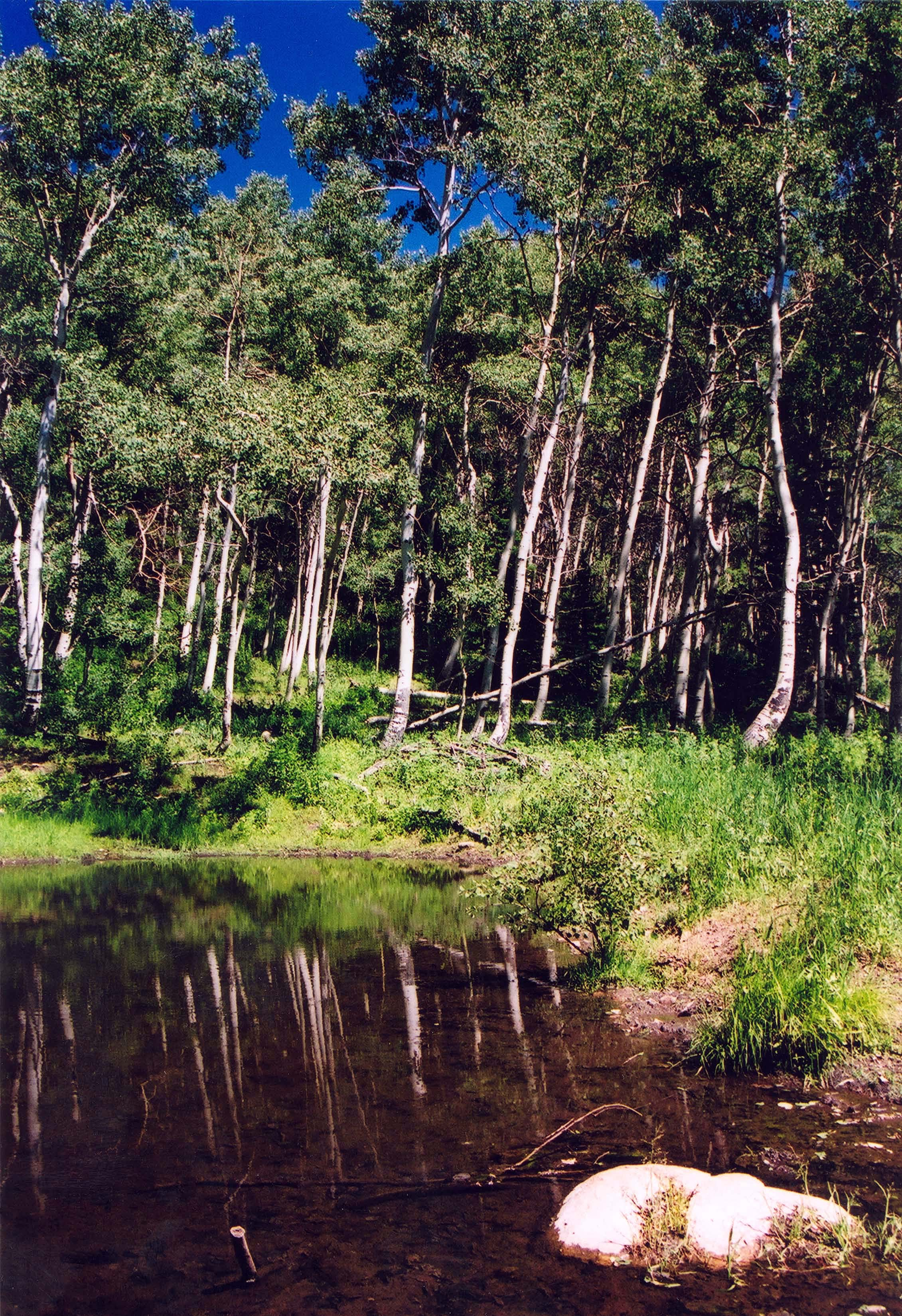
Hansen Pond

There are seven designated wilderness areas in the Wasatch–Cache National Forest, totaling approximately 309,000 acres (1,250 km^{2}) and comprising approximately 25% of the forest's total acreage.

Logan District

- Mount Naomi Wilderness at 44,523 acres (180.18 km^{2})
- Wellsville Mountain Wilderness at 22,986 acres (93.02 km^{2})

Kamas, Evanston, and Mountain View Districts

- High Uintas Wilderness at 456,705 acres (1,848.22 km^{2}) (shared with Ashley National Forest)

Salt Lake District

- Mount Olympus Wilderness at 15,856 acres (64.17 km^{2})
- Twin Peaks Wilderness at 11,796 acres (47.74 km^{2})
- Lone Peak Wilderness at 30,088 acres (121.76 km^{2}) (shared with Uinta National Forest)
- Deseret Peak Wilderness at 25,508 acres (103.23 km^{2})

== See also ==
- Hardware Ranch
- Harker Canyon
- List of national forests of the United States
- Peter Sinks
- Pfeifferhorn - The Little Matterhorn
- Tank Hollow Fire
