= List of mountain peaks of Utah =

Mountain peaks of Utah

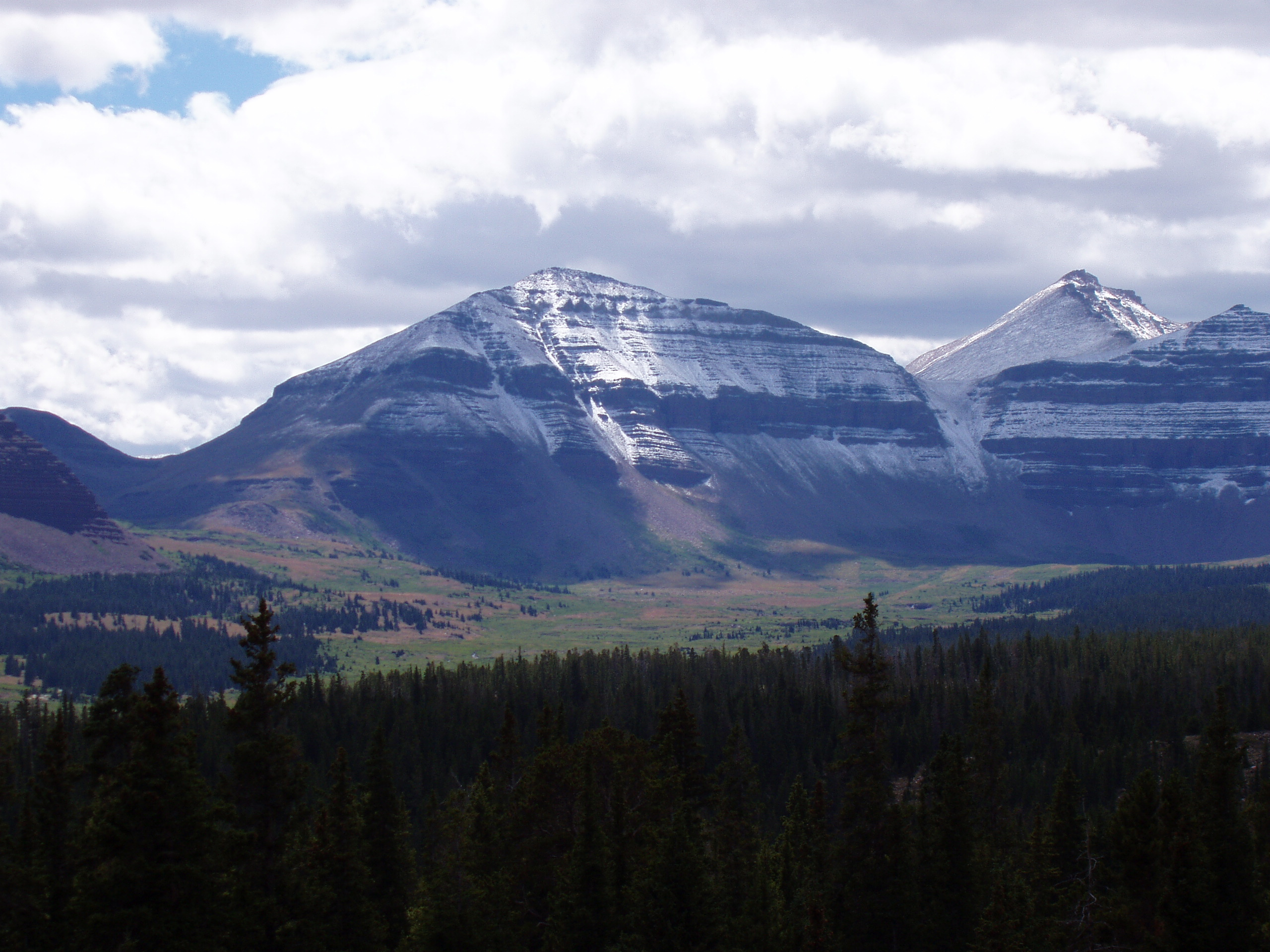
Kings Peak is the highest summit of the Uinta Mountains, the U.S. state of Utah, and the Western Rocky Mountains.

This article comprises three sortable tables of major mountain peaks of the U.S. State of Utah.

The summit of a mountain or hill may be measured in three principal ways:

1. The topographic elevation of a summit measures the height of the summit above sea level.
2. The topographic prominence of a summit is a measure of how high the summit rises above its surroundings.
3. The topographic isolation of a summit measures how far the summit lies from its nearest point of equal elevation.

Utah contains a diverse range of mountain systems, including the high-elevation Uinta Mountains, which contain the only peaks in the state exceeding 13,000 feet in elevation. According to the Utah Geological Survey, Utah has nearly two dozen summits above 13,000 feet, all located in the Uinta Mountains.

For regional peak lists in the United States, a topographic prominence threshold of approximately 300 feet is commonly used to distinguish significant summits from minor subpeaks.

== Highest summits ==
The following table lists the highest summits of Utah with at least 300 feet of topographic prominence.

Rank	Mountain peak	Mountain range	Elevation	Prominence	Isolation	Location
1	Kings Peak (Note: The summit of Kings Peak is the highest point of the Uinta Mountains, the U.S. State of Utah, and the western Rocky Mountains.) (Note: The elevation of Kings Peak includes an adjustment of +1.807 m (5.93 ft) from NGVD 29 to NAVD 88.)	Uinta Mountains	13,529 ft 4123.6 m	6,349 ft 1935 m	166.6 mi 268 km	40.7764°N 110.3730°W
2	South Kings Peak	Uinta Mountains	13,517 ft 4119.9 m	352 ft 107 m	0.8 mi 1.29 km	40.7659°N 110.3779°W
3	Gilbert Peak	Uinta Mountains	13,447 ft 4098.6 m	1,559 ft 475 m	3.6 mi 5.79 km	40.8235°N 110.3400°W
4	Mount Emmons	Uinta Mountains	13,445 ft 4098 m	913 ft 278 m	5.4 mi 8.69 km	40.7118°N 110.3038°W
5	Painter Peak	Uinta Mountains	13,389 ft 4081 m	317 ft 97 m	1.3 mi 2.09 km	40.7531°N 110.3589°W
6	Roberts Peak	Uinta Mountains	13,297 ft 4052.9 m	560 ft 171 m	1.6 mi 2.57 km	40.7356°N 110.3392°W
7	Henrys Fork Peak	Uinta Mountains	13,273 ft 4045.6 m	553 ft 169 m	1.1 mi 1.77 km	40.7879°N 110.3898°W
8	Gunsight Peak	Uinta Mountains	13,271 ft 4045 m	637 ft 194 m	1.4 mi 2.25 km	40.8034°N 110.3528°W
9	Trail Rider Peak	Uinta Mountains	13,255 ft 4040 m	357 ft 109 m	0.7 mi 1.13 km	40.7422°N 110.3526°W
10	Mount Lovenia	Uinta Mountains	13,224 ft 4030.6 m	1,477 ft 450 m	11.6 mi 18.67 km	40.7568°N 110.6071°W
11	Tokewanna Peak	Uinta Mountains	13,169 ft 4013.9 m	1,291 ft 393 m	3.8 mi 6.12 km	40.8100°N 110.6237°W
12	Wasatch Peak	Uinta Mountains	13,159 ft 4011 m	862 ft 263 m	1.8 mi 2.9 km	40.7833°N 110.6238°W
13	Mount Powell	Uinta Mountains	13,156 ft 4009.9 m	813 ft 248 m	0.2 mi 0.32 km	40.7953°N 110.4249°W
14	Dome Peak	Uinta Mountains	13,100 ft 3993 m	644 ft 196 m	0.9 mi 1.45 km	40.7927°N 110.3667°W
15	Pinnacle Peak	Uinta Mountains	13,090 ft 3989.8 m	479 ft 146 m	0.8 mi 1.29 km	40.7225°N 110.3178°W
16	Wilson Peak	Uinta Mountains	13,058 ft 3980 m	1,305 ft 398 m	2.2 mi 3.54 km	40.7759°N 110.4617°W
17	Quandary Peak	Uinta Mountains	13,037 ft 3973.6 m	821 ft 250 m	1.2 mi 1.93 km	40.7627°N 110.5832°W
18	Squaw Benchmark	Uinta Mountains	12,995 ft 3960.8 m	819 ft 250 m	1.6 mi 2.57 km	40.7858°N 110.4903°W
19	Porcupine Mountain	Uinta Mountains	12,890 ft 3929 m	662 ft 202 m	0.9 mi 1.45 km	40.7616°N 110.4734°W
20	Central Blacks Fork Peak	Uinta Mountains	12,867 ft 3922 m	1,060 ft 323 m	2.1 mi 3.38 km	40.7798°N 110.5491°W
21	Kweeyahgut Peak	Uinta Mountains	12,860 ft 3919.7 m	982 ft 299 m	4.2 mi 6.76 km	40.7004°N 110.6433°W
22	South Red Castle Peak	Uinta Mountains	12,828 ft 3910 m	500 ft 152 m	1 mi 1.61 km	40.7906°N 110.4605°W
23	Moose Peak	Uinta Mountains	12,799 ft 3901 m	489 ft 149 m	2 mi 3.22 km	40.8173°N 110.5007°W
24	East Wilson Peak	Uinta Mountains	12,775 ft 3893.8 m	431 ft 131 m	0.6 mi 0.97 km	40.7702°N 110.4514°W
25	South Blacks Fork Peak	Uinta Mountains	12,772 ft 3893 m	350 ft 107 m	0.5 mi 0.8 km	40.7737°N 110.5470°W
26	Northwest Blacks Fork Peak	Uinta Mountains	12,751 ft 3886.5 m	317 ft 97 m	0.7 mi 1.13 km	40.7967°N 110.5578°W
27	South Burro Peak	Uinta Mountains	12,733 ft 3881 m	798 ft 243 m	7.1 mi 11.43 km	40.8319°N 110.1827°W
28	South Porcupine Mountain	Uinta Mountains	12,730 ft 3880 m	398 ft 121 m	0.7 mi 1.13 km	40.7535°N 110.4828°W
29	Mount Peale (Note: The summit of Mount Peale is the highest point of the La Sal Mountains and the Colorado Plateau.)	La Sal Mountains	12,726 ft 3879 m	6,167 ft 1880 m	72.8 mi 117.2 km	38.4385°N 109.2292°W
30	LaMotte Peak	Uinta Mountains	12,726 ft 3879 m	1,149 ft 350 m	6 mi 9.66 km	40.7737°N 110.7520°W
31	Ostler Peak	Uinta Mountains	12,725 ft 3878.5 m	1,175 ft 358 m	2.1 mi 3.38 km	40.7466°N 110.7689°W
32	Explorer Peak	Uinta Mountains	12,713 ft 3875 m	709 ft 216 m	1.2 mi 1.93 km	40.7183°N 110.6439°W
33	Yard Peak	Uinta Mountains	12,710 ft 3874 m	1,105 ft 337 m	2.5 mi 4.02 km	40.7527°N 110.7134°W
34	Stone Benchmark	Uinta Mountains	12,710 ft 3874 m	644 ft 196 m	1.8 mi 2.9 km	40.7336°N 110.5056°W
35	North Timothy Peak	Uinta Mountains	12,696 ft 3869.7 m	407 ft 124 m	1 mi 1.61 km	40.7281°N 110.3736°W
36	Red Castle	Uinta Mountains	12,676 ft 3863.6 m	460 ft 140 m	0.5 mi 0.8 km	40.7987°N 110.4658°W
37	East Burnt Fork Peak	Uinta Mountains	12,673 ft 3862.7 m	1,369 ft 417 m	4.1 mi 6.6 km	40.8109°N 110.1090°W
38	South Timothy Peak	Uinta Mountains	12,654 ft 3856.9 m	464 ft 141 m	0.9 mi 1.45 km	40.7156°N 110.3766°W
39	Mount Mellenthin	La Sal Mountains	12,651 ft 3856 m	689 ft 210 m	1.7 mi 2.74 km	38.4633°N 109.2339°W
40	North Allsop Peak	Uinta Mountains	12,635 ft 3851 m	981 ft 299 m	2.1 mi 3.38 km	40.7733°N 110.6828°W
41	Dead Horse Peak	Uinta Mountains	12,631 ft 3850 m	743 ft 226 m	1.3 mi 2.09 km	40.7433°N 110.6927°W
42	Cleveland Peak	Uinta Mountains	12,595 ft 3838.9 m	385 ft 117 m	0.9 mi 1.45 km	40.6875°N 110.6297°W
43	Mount Beulah	Uinta Mountains	12,561 ft 3828.5 m	728 ft 222 m	1.4 mi 2.25 km	40.7940°N 110.6820°W
44	Meadow Peak	Uinta Mountains	12,551 ft 3825.5 m	551 ft 168 m	2 mi 3.22 km	40.7493°N 110.6471°W
45	Spread Eagle Peak	Uinta Mountains	12,546 ft 3824 m	838 ft 255 m	1.1 mi 1.77 km	40.7297°N 110.7836°W
46	Oweep Peak	Uinta Mountains	12,536 ft 3821 m	469 ft 143 m	1.2 mi 1.93 km	40.7640°N 110.5156°W
47	Cleve Peak	Uinta Mountains	12,526 ft 3817.9 m	1,144 ft 349 m	3.2 mi 5.15 km	40.7653°N 110.1360°W
48	Val Benchmark Peak	Uinta Mountains	12,512 ft 3813.6 m	784 ft 239 m	2.7 mi 4.35 km	40.7606°N 110.2887°W
49	South Yard Peak	Uinta Mountains	12,503 ft 3810.9 m	420 ft 128 m	0.5 mi 0.8 km	40.7455°N 110.7214°W
50	Mount Tukuhnikivatz	La Sal Mountains	12,484 ft 3805 m	756 ft 230 m	1.5 mi 2.41 km	38.4395°N 109.2598°W

== Most prominent summits ==
Of the most prominent summits of Utah, eight peaks are ultra-prominent summits with more than 1500 meters (4921 feet) of topographic prominence and 33 peaks exceed 1000 meters (3281 feet) of topographic prominence.

The 50 most topographically prominent summits of Utah
Rank	Mountain peak	Mountain range	Elevation	Prominence	Isolation	Location
1	Kings Peak	Uinta Mountains	13,534 ft 4125 m	6,358 ft 1938 m	166.6 mi 268 km	40.7763°N 110.3729°W
2	Mount Peale	La Sal Mountains	12,726 ft 3879 m	6,181 ft 1884 m	72.8 mi 117.1 km	38.4385°N 109.2292°W
3	Mount Ellen Peak (Note: The summit of Mount Ellen Peak is the highest point of the Henry Mountains.) (Note: The elevation of Mount Ellen Peak includes an adjustment of +1.486 m (4.88 ft) from NGVD 29 to NAVD 88.)	Henry Mountains	11,527 ft 3513 m	5,862 ft 1787 m	56 mi 90.2 km	38.1089°N 110.8136°W
4	Deseret Peak (Note: The summit of Deseret Peak is the highest point of the Stansbury Mountains.)	Stansbury Mountains	11,035 ft 3364 m	5,812 ft 1772 m	46 mi 74 km	40.4595°N 112.6264°W
5	Mount Nebo (Note: The summit of Mount Nebo is the highest point of the Wasatch Range.) (Note: The elevation of Mount Nebo includes an adjustment of +1.395 m (4.58 ft) from NGVD 29 to NAVD 88.)	Wasatch Range	11,933 ft 3637 m	5,508 ft 1679 m	75.6 mi 121.6 km	39.8219°N 111.7603°W
6	Flat Top Mountain (Note: The summit of Flat Top Mountain is the highest point of the Oquirrh Mountains.) (Note: The elevation of Flat Top Mountain includes an adjustment of +1.329 m (4.36 ft) from NGVD 29 to NAVD 88.)	Oquirrh Mountains	10,624 ft 3238 m	5,383 ft 1641 m	23.8 mi 38.4 km	40.3724°N 112.1888°W
7	Mount Timpanogos (Note: The summit of Mount Timpanogos is the highest point of the central Wasatch Range.)	Wasatch Range	11,752 ft 3582 m	5,279 ft 1609 m	39.6 mi 63.8 km	40.3908°N 111.6459°W
8	Ibapah Peak (Note: The summit of Ibapah Peak is the highest point of the Deep Creek Range.) (Note: The elevation of Ibapah Peak includes an adjustment of +1.517 m (4.98 ft) from NGVD 29 to NAVD 88.)	Deep Creek Range	12,092 ft 3686 m	5,267 ft 1605 m	61.2 mi 98.5 km	39.8282°N 113.9200°W
9	Delano Peak (Note: The summit of Delano Peak is the highest point of the Tushar Mountains.)	Tushar Mountains	12,174 ft 3710.7 m	4,709 ft 1435 m	112.1 mi 180.5 km	38.3692°N 112.3714°W
10	Abajo Peak (Note: The summit of Abajo Peak is the highest point of the Abajo Mountains.)	Abajo Mountains	11,362 ft 3463 m	4,555 ft 1388 m	39.9 mi 64.2 km	37.8395°N 109.4624°W
11	Swasey Peak (Note: The summit of Swasey Peak is the highest point of the House Range.) (Note: The summit elevation of Swasey Peak includes a vertical offset of +0.61 m (2 ft) from the station benchmark.)	House Range	9,675 ft 2949 m	4,529 ft 1380 m	40.7 mi 65.5 km	39.3882°N 113.3164°W
12	Signal Peak (Note: The summit of Signal Peak is the highest point of the Pine Valley Mountains.) (Note: The elevation of Signal Peak includes an adjustment of +1.249 m (4.1 ft) from NGVD 29 to NAVD 88.)	Pine Valley Mountains	10,369 ft 3161 m	4,505 ft 1373 m	35 mi 56.3 km	37.3195°N 113.4922°W
13	Navajo Mountain	Colorado Plateau	10,348 ft 3154.2 m	4,236 ft 1291 m	58.6 mi 94.3 km	37.0343°N 110.8697°W
14	Fish Lake Hightop (Note: The summit of Fish Lake Hightop is the highest point of the Fish Lake Plateau.)	Fish Lake Plateau	11,639 ft 3547.5 m	4,157 ft 1267 m	35.5 mi 57.1 km	38.6080°N 111.7394°W
15	Monroe Peak (Note: The summit of Monroe Peak is the highest point of the Sevier Plateau.)	Sevier Plateau	11,232 ft 3423.6 m	4,117 ft 1255 m	17.17 mi 27.6 km	38.5361°N 112.0734°W
16	Frisco Peak (Note: The summit of Frisco Peak is the highest point of the San Francisco Mountains.)	San Francisco Mountains	9,663 ft 2945.25 m	4,040 ft 1231 m	36.3 mi 58.4 km	38.5204°N 113.2876°W
17	Mount Ogden	Wasatch Range	9,570 ft 2917 m	3,830 ft 1167 m	8.3 mi 13.35 km	41.1999°N 111.8820°W
18	Brian Head (Note: The summit of Brian Head is the highest point of the Markagunt Plateau.) (Note: The elevation of Brian Head includes an adjustment of +1.556 m (5.1 ft) from NGVD 29 to NAVD 88.)	Markagunt Plateau	11,312 ft 3448 m	3,767 ft 1148 m	42.5 mi 68.5 km	37.6812°N 112.8312°W
19	Bull Mountain (Note: The summit of Bull Mountain is the highest point of the Raft River Mountains.) (Note: The elevation of Bull Mountain includes an adjustment of +1.343 m (4.41 ft) from NGVD 29 to NAVD 88.)	Raft River Mountains	9,938 ft 3029 m	3,754 ft 1144 m	24.3 mi 39.2 km	41.9100°N 113.3659°W
20	Raft River Peak	Raft River Mountains	9,931 ft 3027 m	3,740 ft 1140 m	23.9 mi 38.5 km	41.9048°N 113.3888°W
21	Fool Creek Peak (Note: The summit of Fool Creek Peak is the highest point of the Canyon Mountains.)	Canyon Mountains	9,717 ft 2961.7 m	3,732 ft 1138 m	23.1 mi 37.3 km	39.3926°N 112.2072°W
22	Salt Benchmark (Note: The summit of Salt Benchmark is the highest point of the San Pitch Mountains.)	San Pitch Mountains	10,001 ft 3048.4 m	3,697 ft 1127 m	10.13 mi 16.3 km	39.6649°N 111.7432°W
23	Twin Peaks (Note: The elevation of Twin Peaks includes an adjustment of +1.463 m (4.8 ft) from NGVD 29 to NAVD 88.)	Wasatch Range	11,494 ft 3503 m	3,669 ft 1118 m	11.12 mi 17.89 km	40.5518°N 111.6566°W
24	Indian Peak (Note: The summit of Indian Peak is the highest point of the Indian Peak Range.) (Note: The elevation of Indian Peak includes an adjustment of +1.374 m (4.51 ft) from NGVD 29 to NAVD 88.)	Indian Peak Range	9,795 ft 2985 m	3,660 ft 1116 m	39.6 mi 63.7 km	38.2670°N 113.8753°W
24	West Mountain Peak (Note: The summit of West Mountain Peak is the highest point of the Beaver Dam Mountains.)	Beaver Dam Mountains	7,684 ft 2342 m	3,660 ft 1116 m	22.1 mi 35.5 km	37.1552°N 113.8833°W
26	George H. Hansen Peak (Note: The summit of George H. Hansen Peak is the highest point of the Fish Springs Range.)	Fish Springs Range	8,527 ft 2599 m	3,613 ft 1101 m	23 mi 37 km	39.7252°N 113.4401°W
27	Mount Pennell	Henry Mountains	11,413 ft 3478.7 m	3,588 ft 1094 m	8.02 mi 12.9 km	37.9564°N 110.7908°W
28	Box Elder Peak (Note: The summit of Box Elder Peak is the highest point of the Wellsvillle Mountains.)	Wellsvillle Mountains	9,376 ft 2857.8 m	3,472 ft 1058 m	16.27 mi 26.2 km	41.6356°N 112.0145°W
29	Provo Peak (Note: The elevation of Provo Peak includes an adjustment of +1.31 m (4.3 ft) from NGVD 29 to NAVD 88.)	Wasatch Range	11,072 ft 3375 m	3,448 ft 1051 m	10.54 mi 16.97 km	40.2443°N 111.5570°W
30	Notch Peak (Note: The summit elevation of Notch Peak includes a vertical offset of +0.102 m (0.3 ft) from the station benchmark.)	House Range	9,658 ft 2943.9 m	3,434 ft 1047 m	17.62 mi 28.4 km	39.1432°N 113.4094°W
31	Mount Dutton	Sevier Plateau	11,047 ft 3367.2 m	3,411 ft 1040 m	15.76 mi 25.4 km	38.0206°N 112.2173°W
32	South Tent Mountain (Note: The summit of South Tent Mountain is the highest point of the Wasatch Plateau.)	Wasatch Plateau	11,288 ft 3440.5 m	3,385 ft 1032 m	35.8 mi 57.5 km	39.3922°N 111.3576°W
33	Mount Hillers (Note: The elevation of Mount Hillers includes an adjustment of +1.364 m (4.48 ft) from NGVD 29 to NAVD 88.)	Henry Mountains	10,741 ft 3274 m	3,357 ft 1023 m	7 mi 11.27 km	37.8874°N 110.6970°W
34	Willard Peak (Note: The summit of Willard Peak is the highest point of the northern Wasatch Range.)	Wasatch Range	9,771 ft 2978.1 m	3,263 ft 995 m	39.4 mi 63.5 km	41.3828°N 111.9746°W
35	Naomi Peak (Note: The summit of Naomi Peak is the highest point of the Bear River Mountains.)	Wasatch Range	9,984 ft 3043 m	3,169 ft 966 m	61.5 mi 98.9 km	41.9114°N 111.6754°W
36	Wah Wah Mountain (Note: The summit of Wah Wah Mountain is the highest point of the Wah Wah Mountains.)	Wah Wah Mountains	9,387 ft 2861.14 m	3,084 ft 940 m	16.8 mi 27 km	38.3602°N 113.5839°W
37	Granite Peak (Note: The summit of Granite Peak is the highest point of the Mineral Mountains.) (Note: The summit elevation of Granite Peak includes a vertical offset of +0.61 m (2 ft) from the station benchmark.)	Mineral Mountains	9,587 ft 2922 m	3,002 ft 915 m	20.8 mi 33.4 km	38.3829°N 112.8147°W
38	Mine Camp Peak (Note: The summit of Mine Camp Peak is the highest point of the Pavant Range.) (Note: The elevation of Mine Camp Peak includes an adjustment of +1.418 m (4.65 ft) from NGVD 29 to NAVD 88.)	Pavant Range	10,227 ft 3117 m	3,001 ft 915 m	20.1 mi 32.3 km	38.8737°N 112.2534°W
39	Logan Peak	Bear River Mountains	9,719 ft 2962.2 m	2,995 ft 913 m	13.83 mi 22.3 km	41.7135°N 111.7177°W
40	Spanish Fork Peak	Wasatch Range	10,196 ft 3107.6 m	2,972 ft 906 m	8.83 mi 14.21 km	40.0879°N 111.5277°W
41	Bluebell Knoll (Note: The elevation of Bluebell Knoll includes an adjustment of +1.708 m (5.6 ft) from NGVD 29 to NAVD 88.)	Aquarius Plateau	11,346 ft 3458 m	2,930 ft 893 m	32.6 mi 52.5 km	38.1594°N 111.5004°W
42	Loafer Mountain	Wasatch Range	10,689 ft 3258 m	2,905 ft 885 m	10.22 mi 16.45 km	39.9833°N 111.6237°W
43	Bruin Point	Roan Cliffs	10,187 ft 3105 m	2,724 ft 830 m	42.9 mi 69.1 km	39.6442°N 110.3482°W
44	Thurston Peak	Wasatch Range	9,710 ft 2959.68 m	2,697 ft 822 m	20.2 mi 32.6 km	41.0820°N 111.8516°W
45	Thousand Lake Mountain	Fish Lake Plateau	11,300 ft 3444.3 m	2,366 ft 721 m	17.81 mi 28.7 km	38.4171°N 111.4793°W
46	Strawberry Peak (Note: The summit of Strawberry Peak is the highest point of the Roan Cliffs.)	Roan Cliffs	10,341 ft 3152 m	2,338 ft 713 m	19.46 mi 31.3 km	40.0470°N 110.9847°W
47	Mount Hilgard (Note: The elevation of Mount Hilgard includes an adjustment of +1.615 m (5.3 ft) from NGVD 29 to NAVD 88.)	Fish Lake Plateau	11,538 ft 3517 m	2,103 ft 641 m	5.37 mi 8.65 km	38.6841°N 111.5438°W
48	Mount Marvine	Fish Lake Plateau	11,604 ft 3537 m	1,870 ft 570 m	6.75 mi 10.86 km	38.6682°N 111.6411°W
49	Glenwood Mountain	Sevier Plateau	11,220 ft 3420 m	1,846 ft 563 m	6.9 mi 11.11 km	38.6253°N 112.0157°W
50	Dry Mountain (Note: The elevation of Dry Mountain includes an adjustment of +1.222 m (4.01 ft) from NGVD 29 to NAVD 88.)	Wasatch Range	9,869 ft 3008 m	1,845 ft 562 m	4.59 mi 7.39 km	39.9406°N 111.7316°W

== Most isolated major summits ==
Of the most isolated major summits of Utah, Kings Peak exceeds 200 kilometers (124.3 miles) of topographic isolation and four peaks exceed 100 kilometers (62.14 miles) of topographic isolation.

The 50 most topographically isolated summits of Utah with at least 500 meters of topographic prominence
Rank	Mountain peak	Mountain range	Elevation	Prominence	Isolation	Location
1	Kings Peak	Uinta Mountains	13,534 ft 4125 m	6,358 ft 1938 m	166.6 mi 268 km	40.7763°N 110.3729°W
2	Delano Peak	Tushar Mountains	12,174 ft 3710.7 m	4,709 ft 1435 m	112.1 mi 180.5 km	38.3692°N 112.3714°W
3	Mount Nebo	Wasatch Range	11,933 ft 3637 m	5,508 ft 1679 m	75.6 mi 121.6 km	39.8219°N 111.7603°W
4	Mount Peale	La Sal Mountains	12,726 ft 3879 m	6,181 ft 1884 m	72.8 mi 117.1 km	38.4385°N 109.2292°W
5	Naomi Peak	Wasatch Range	9,984 ft 3043 m	3,169 ft 966 m	61.5 mi 98.9 km	41.9114°N 111.6754°W
6	Ibapah Peak	Deep Creek Range	12,092 ft 3686 m	5,267 ft 1605 m	61.2 mi 98.5 km	39.8282°N 113.9200°W
7	Navajo Mountain	Colorado Plateau	10,348 ft 3154.2 m	4,236 ft 1291 m	58.6 mi 94.3 km	37.0343°N 110.8697°W
8	Mount Ellen Peak	Henry Mountains	11,527 ft 3513 m	5,862 ft 1787 m	56 mi 90.2 km	38.1089°N 110.8136°W
9	Deseret Peak	Stansbury Mountains	11,035 ft 3364 m	5,812 ft 1772 m	46 mi 74 km	40.4595°N 112.6264°W
10	Bruin Point	Roan Cliffs	10,187 ft 3105 m	2,724 ft 830 m	42.9 mi 69.1 km	39.6442°N 110.3482°W
11	Brian Head	Markagunt Plateau	11,312 ft 3448 m	3,767 ft 1148 m	42.5 mi 68.5 km	37.6812°N 112.8312°W
12	Swasey Peak	House Range	9,675 ft 2949 m	4,529 ft 1380 m	40.7 mi 65.5 km	39.3882°N 113.3164°W
13	Abajo Peak	Abajo Mountains	11,362 ft 3463 m	4,555 ft 1388 m	39.9 mi 64.2 km	37.8395°N 109.4624°W
14	Mount Timpanogos	Wasatch Range	11,752 ft 3582 m	5,279 ft 1609 m	39.6 mi 63.8 km	40.3908°N 111.6459°W
15	Indian Peak (Note: The summit of Indian Peak is the highest point of the Indian Peak Range.) (Note: The elevation of Indian Peak includes an adjustment of +1.374 m (4.51 ft) from NGVD 29 to NAVD 88.)	Indian Peak Range	9,795 ft 2985 m	3,660 ft 1116 m	39.6 mi 63.7 km	38.2670°N 113.8753°W
16	Willard Peak	Wasatch Range	9,771 ft 2978.1 m	3,263 ft 995 m	39.4 mi 63.5 km	41.3828°N 111.9746°W
17	Frisco Peak	San Francisco Mountains	9,663 ft 2945.25 m	4,040 ft 1231 m	36.3 mi 58.4 km	38.5204°N 113.2876°W
18	South Tent Mountain	Wasatch Plateau	11,288 ft 3440.5 m	3,385 ft 1032 m	35.8 mi 57.5 km	39.3922°N 111.3576°W
19	Fish Lake Hightop	Fish Lake Plateau	11,639 ft 3547.5 m	4,157 ft 1267 m	35.5 mi 57.1 km	38.6080°N 111.7394°W
20	Signal Peak	Pine Valley Mountains	10,369 ft 3161 m	4,505 ft 1373 m	35 mi 56.3 km	37.3195°N 113.4922°W
21	Bluebell Knoll	Aquarius Plateau	11,346 ft 3458 m	2,930 ft 893 m	32.6 mi 52.5 km	38.1594°N 111.5004°W
22	Bull Mountain	Raft River Mountains	9,938 ft 3029 m	3,754 ft 1144 m	24.3 mi 39.2 km	41.9100°N 113.3659°W
23	Raft River Peak	Raft River Mountains	9,931 ft 3027 m	3,740 ft 1140 m	23.9 mi 38.5 km	41.9048°N 113.3888°W
24	Flat Top Mountain	Oquirrh Mountains	10,624 ft 3238 m	5,383 ft 1641 m	23.8 mi 38.4 km	40.3724°N 112.1888°W
25	Fool Creek Peak	Canyon Mountains	9,717 ft 2961.7 m	3,732 ft 1138 m	23.1 mi 37.3 km	39.3926°N 112.2072°W
26	George H. Hansen Peak	Fish Springs Range	8,527 ft 2599 m	3,613 ft 1101 m	23 mi 37 km	39.7252°N 113.4401°W
27	West Mountain Peak	Beaver Dam Mountains	7,684 ft 2342 m	3,660 ft 1116 m	22.1 mi 35.5 km	37.1552°N 113.8833°W
28	Granite Peak	Mineral Mountains	9,587 ft 2922 m	3,002 ft 915 m	20.8 mi 33.4 km	38.3829°N 112.8147°W
29	Thurston Peak	Wasatch Range	9,710 ft 2959.68 m	2,697 ft 822 m	20.2 mi 32.6 km	41.0820°N 111.8516°W
30	Mine Camp Peak	Pavant Range	10,227 ft 3117 m	3,001 ft 915 m	20.1 mi 32.3 km	38.8737°N 112.2534°W
31	Strawberry Peak	Roan Cliffs	10,341 ft 3152 m	2,338 ft 713 m	19.46 mi 31.3 km	40.0470°N 110.9847°W
32	Thousand Lake Mountain	Fish Lake Plateau	11,300 ft 3444.3 m	2,366 ft 721 m	17.81 mi 28.7 km	38.4171°N 111.4793°W
33	Notch Peak	House Range	9,658 ft 2943.9 m	3,434 ft 1047 m	17.62 mi 28.4 km	39.1432°N 113.4094°W
34	Monroe Peak	Sevier Plateau	11,232 ft 3423.6 m	4,117 ft 1255 m	17.17 mi 27.6 km	38.5361°N 112.0734°W
35	Wah Wah Mountain	Wah Wah Mountains	9,387 ft 2861.14 m	3,084 ft 940 m	16.8 mi 27 km	38.3602°N 113.5839°W
36	Box Elder Peak	Wellsvillle Mountains	9,376 ft 2857.8 m	3,472 ft 1058 m	16.27 mi 26.2 km	41.6356°N 112.0145°W
37	Mount Dutton	Sevier Plateau	11,047 ft 3367.2 m	3,411 ft 1040 m	15.76 mi 25.4 km	38.0206°N 112.2173°W
38	Logan Peak	Bear River Mountains	9,719 ft 2962.2 m	2,995 ft 913 m	13.83 mi 22.3 km	41.7135°N 111.7177°W
39	Twin Peaks	Wasatch Range	11,494 ft 3503 m	3,669 ft 1118 m	11.12 mi 17.89 km	40.5518°N 111.6566°W
40	Circleville Mountain	Tushar Mountains	11,336 ft 3455.3 m	1,671 ft 509 m	11.05 mi 17.79 km	38.1964°N 112.4020°W
41	Provo Peak	Wasatch Range	11,072 ft 3375 m	3,448 ft 1051 m	10.54 mi 16.97 km	40.2443°N 111.5570°W
42	Loafer Mountain	Wasatch Range	10,689 ft 3258 m	2,905 ft 885 m	10.22 mi 16.45 km	39.9833°N 111.6237°W
43	Salt Benchmark	San Pitch Mountains	10,001 ft 3048.4 m	3,697 ft 1127 m	10.13 mi 16.3 km	39.6649°N 111.7432°W
44	Spanish Fork Peak	Wasatch Range	10,196 ft 3107.6 m	2,972 ft 906 m	8.83 mi 14.21 km	40.0879°N 111.5277°W
45	Mount Ogden	Wasatch Range	9,570 ft 2917 m	3,830 ft 1167 m	8.3 mi 13.35 km	41.1999°N 111.8820°W
46	Mount Pennell	Henry Mountains	11,413 ft 3478.7 m	3,588 ft 1094 m	8.02 mi 12.9 km	37.9564°N 110.7908°W
47	Mount Hillers	Henry Mountains	10,741 ft 3274 m	3,357 ft 1023 m	7 mi 11.27 km	37.8874°N 110.6970°W
48	Glenwood Mountain	Sevier Plateau	11,220 ft 3420 m	1,846 ft 563 m	6.9 mi 11.11 km	38.6253°N 112.0157°W
49	Mount Marvine	Fish Lake Plateau	11,604 ft 3537 m	1,870 ft 570 m	6.75 mi 10.86 km	38.6682°N 111.6411°W
50	Shay Mountain (Note: The elevation of Shay Mountain includes an adjustment of +1.249 m (4.1 ft) from NGVD 29 to NAVD 88.)	Abajo Mountains	9,993 ft 3046 m	1,649 ft 503 m	6.19 mi 9.96 km	37.9355°N 109.5489°W

== Gallery ==
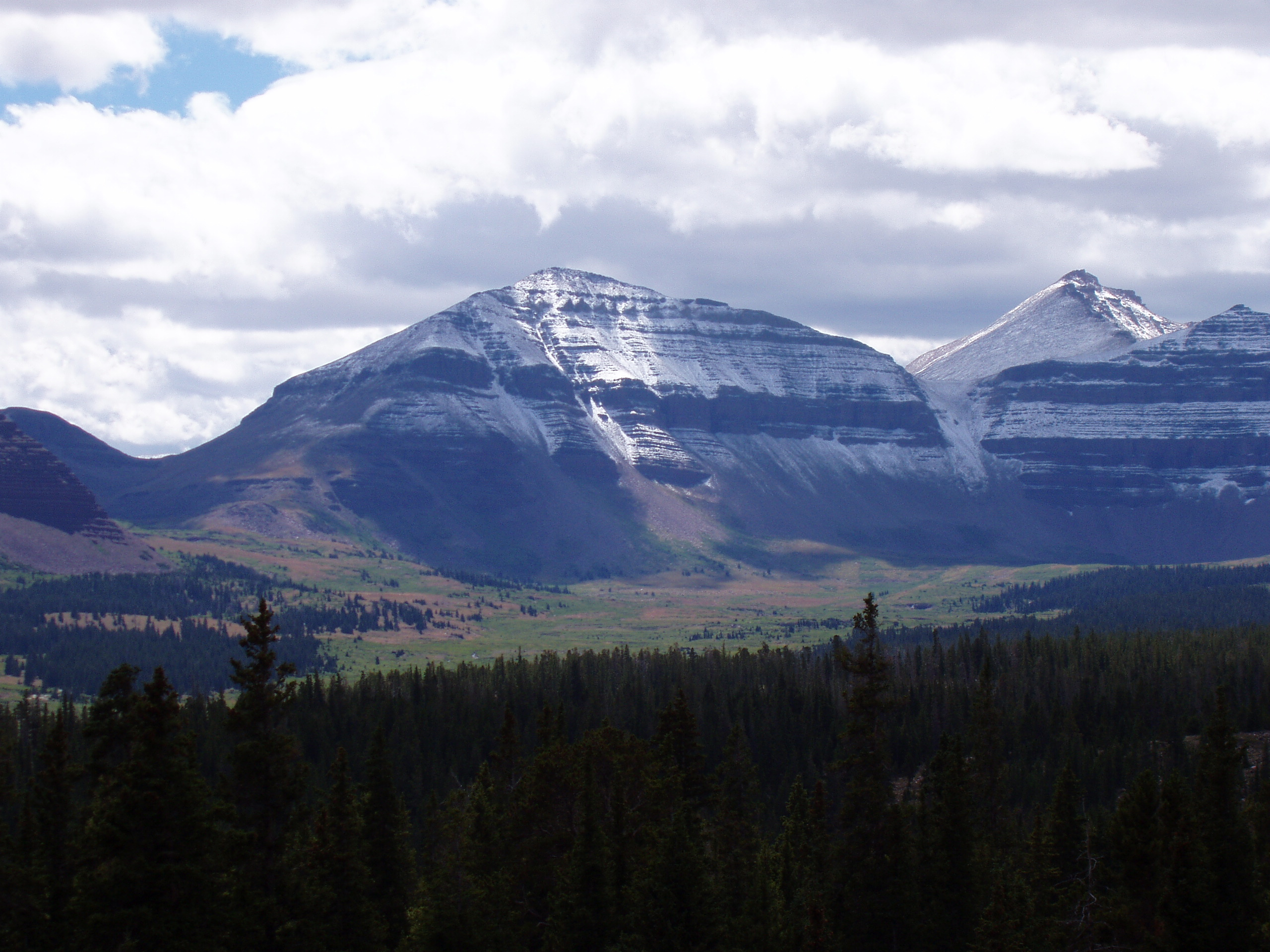
Kings Peak

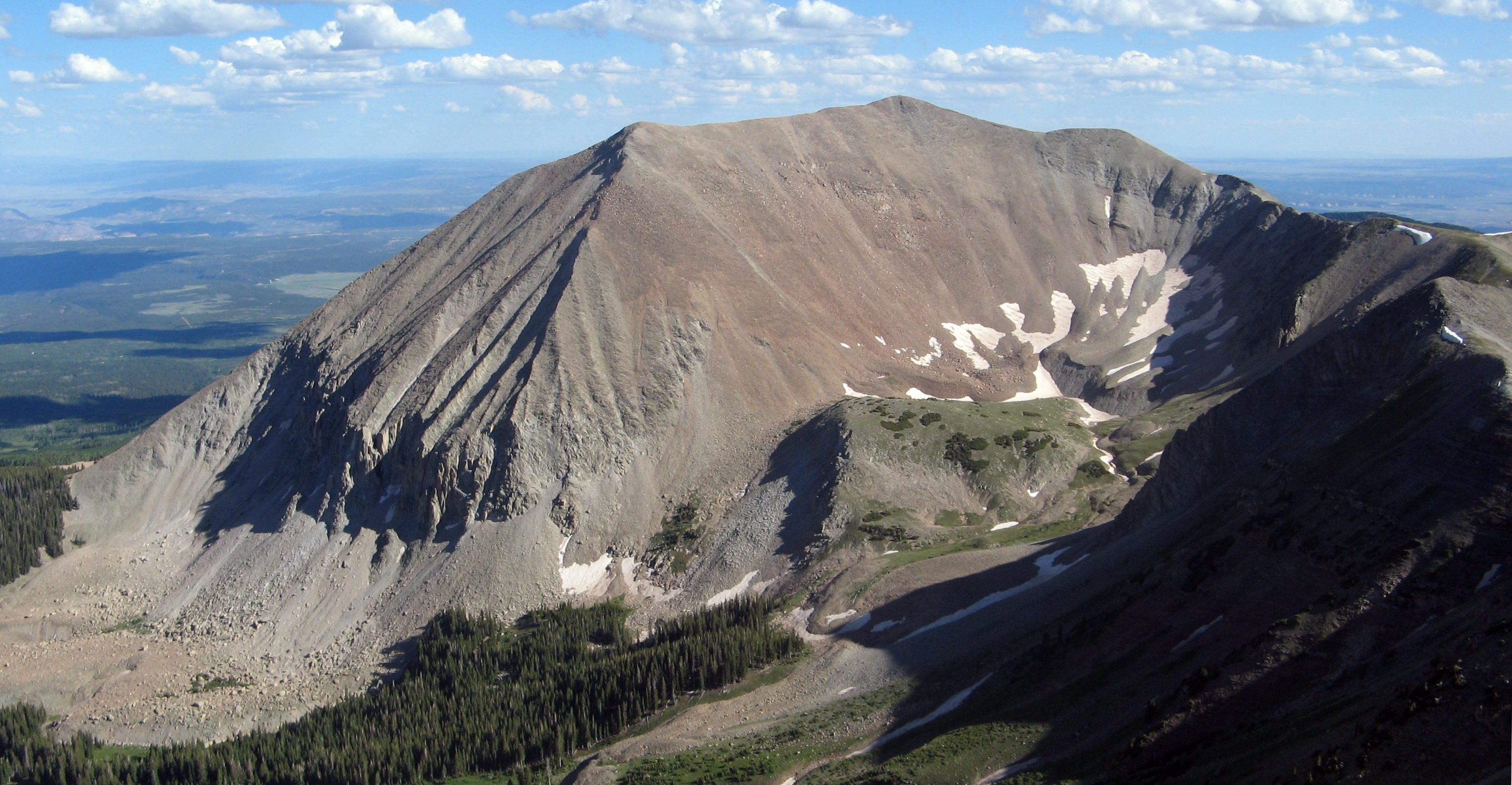
Mount Peale

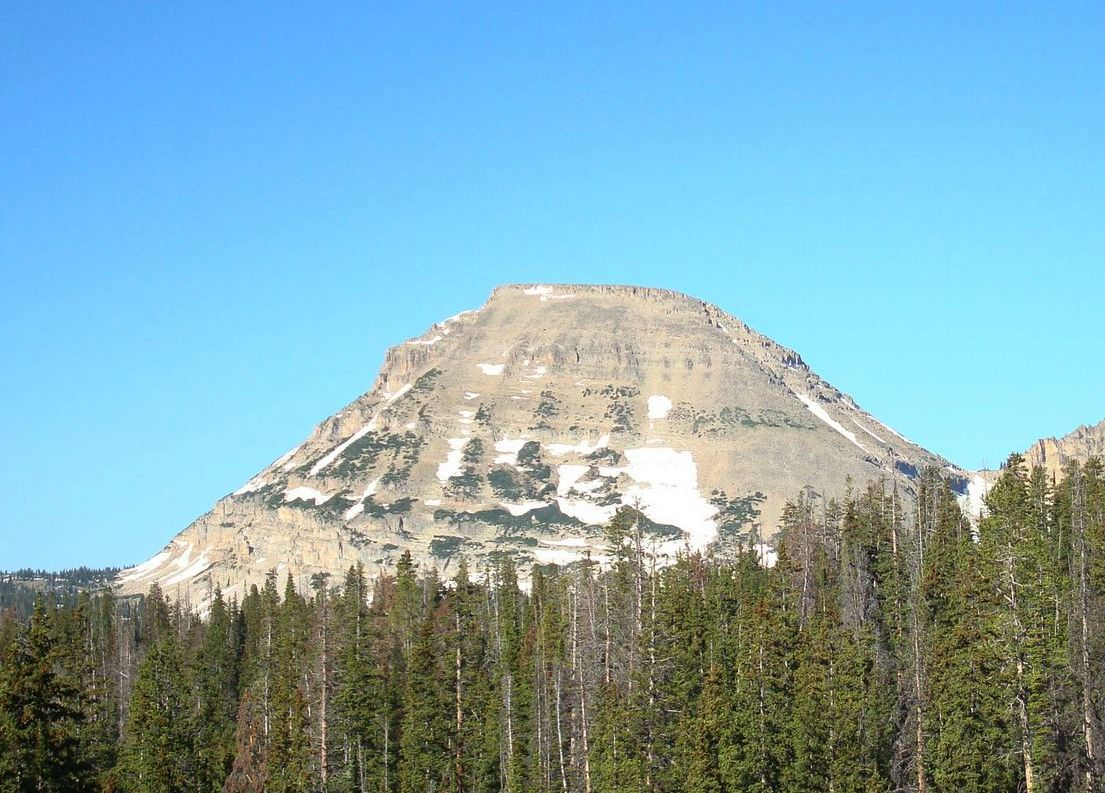
Bald Mountain

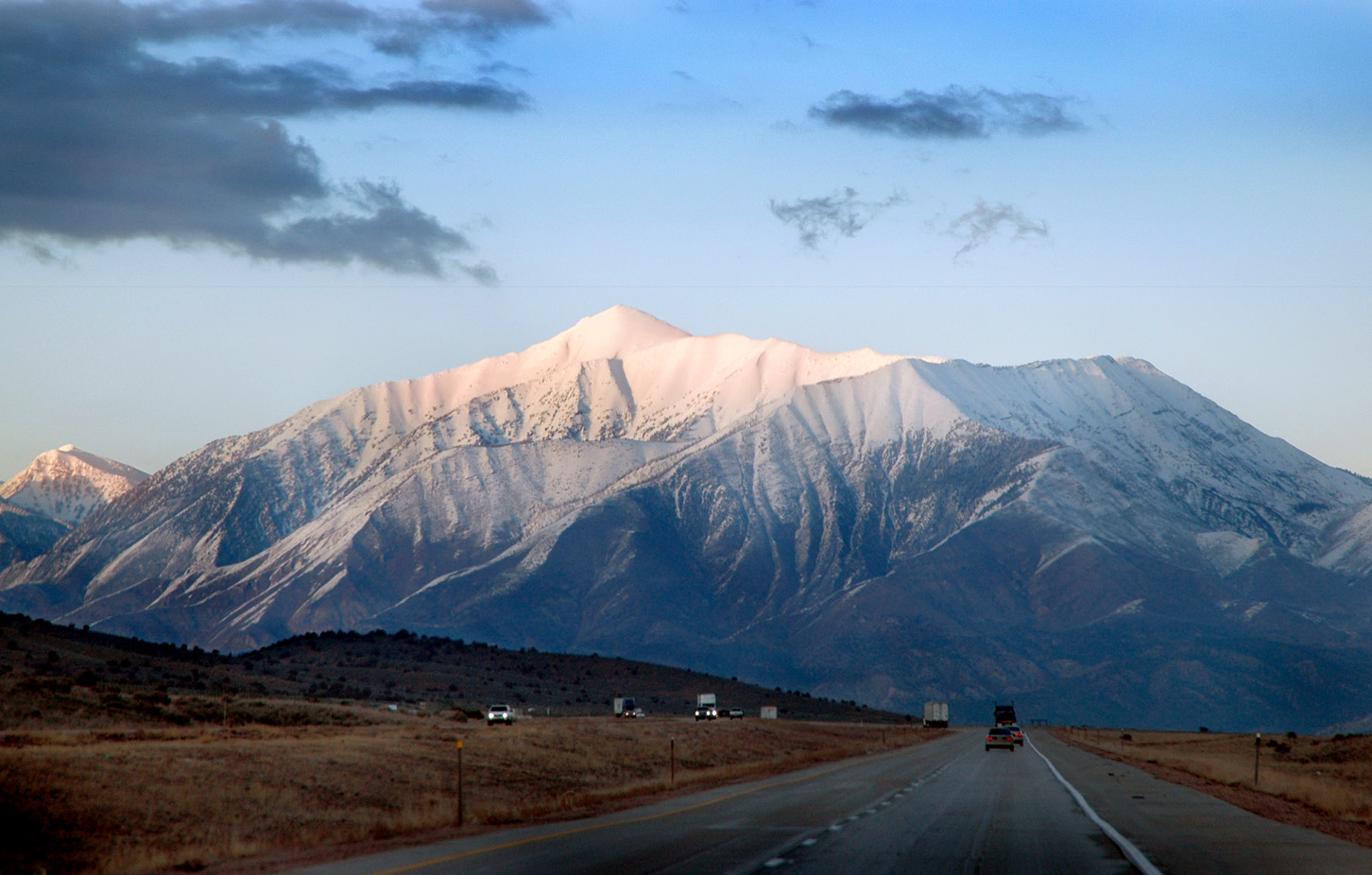
Mount Nebo is the highest summit of the Wasatch Range.

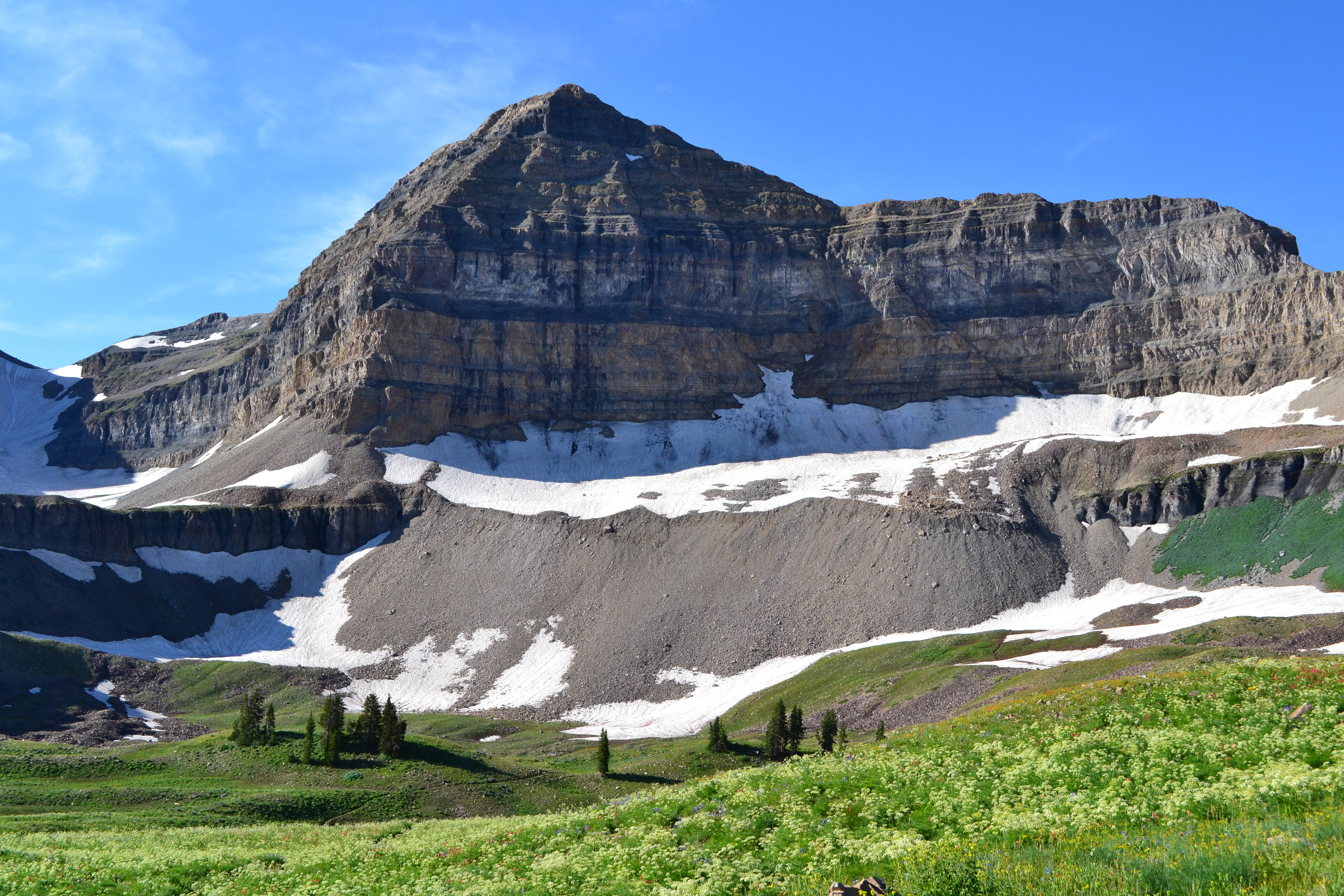
Mount Timpanogos (back/east side)

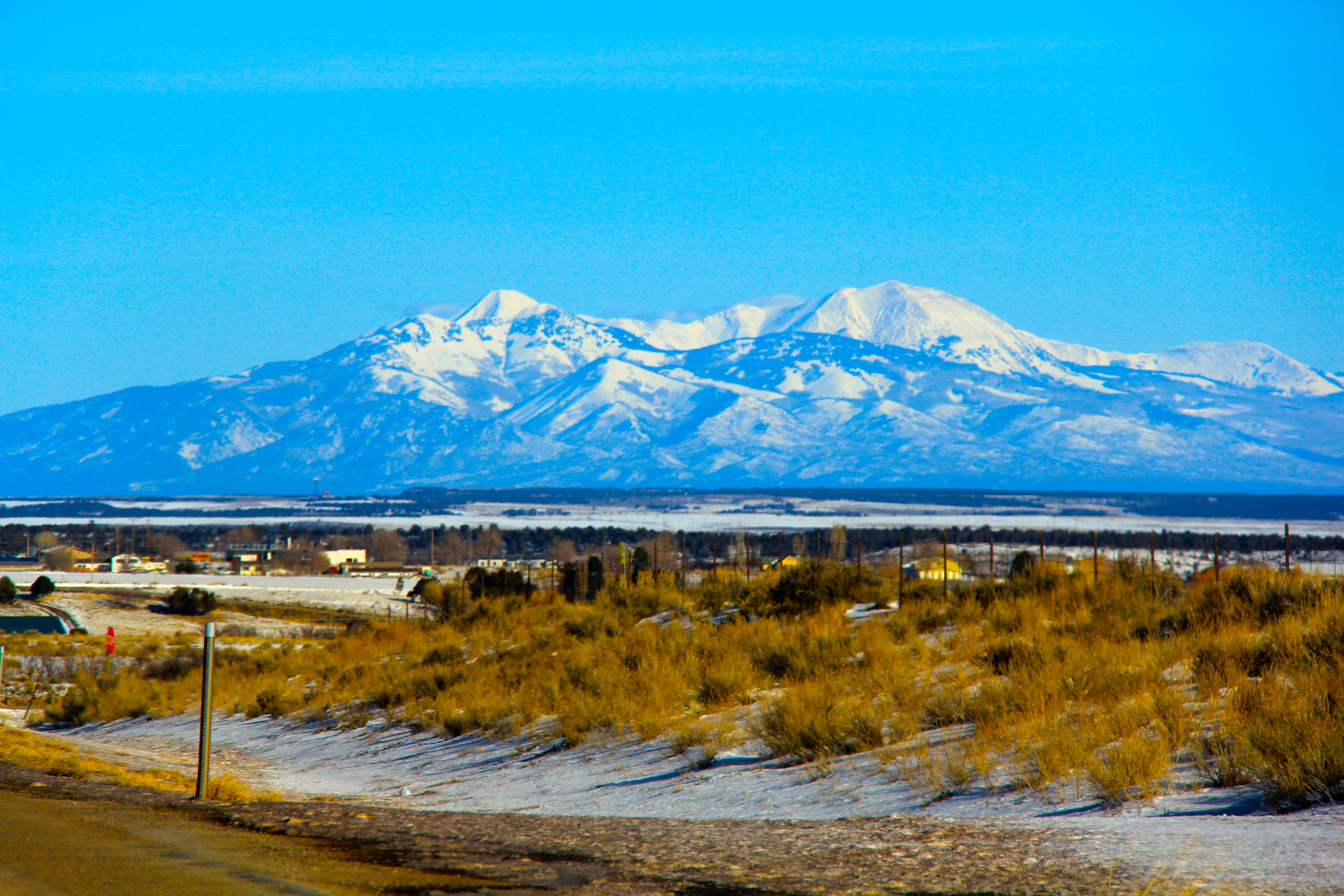
Abajo Peak

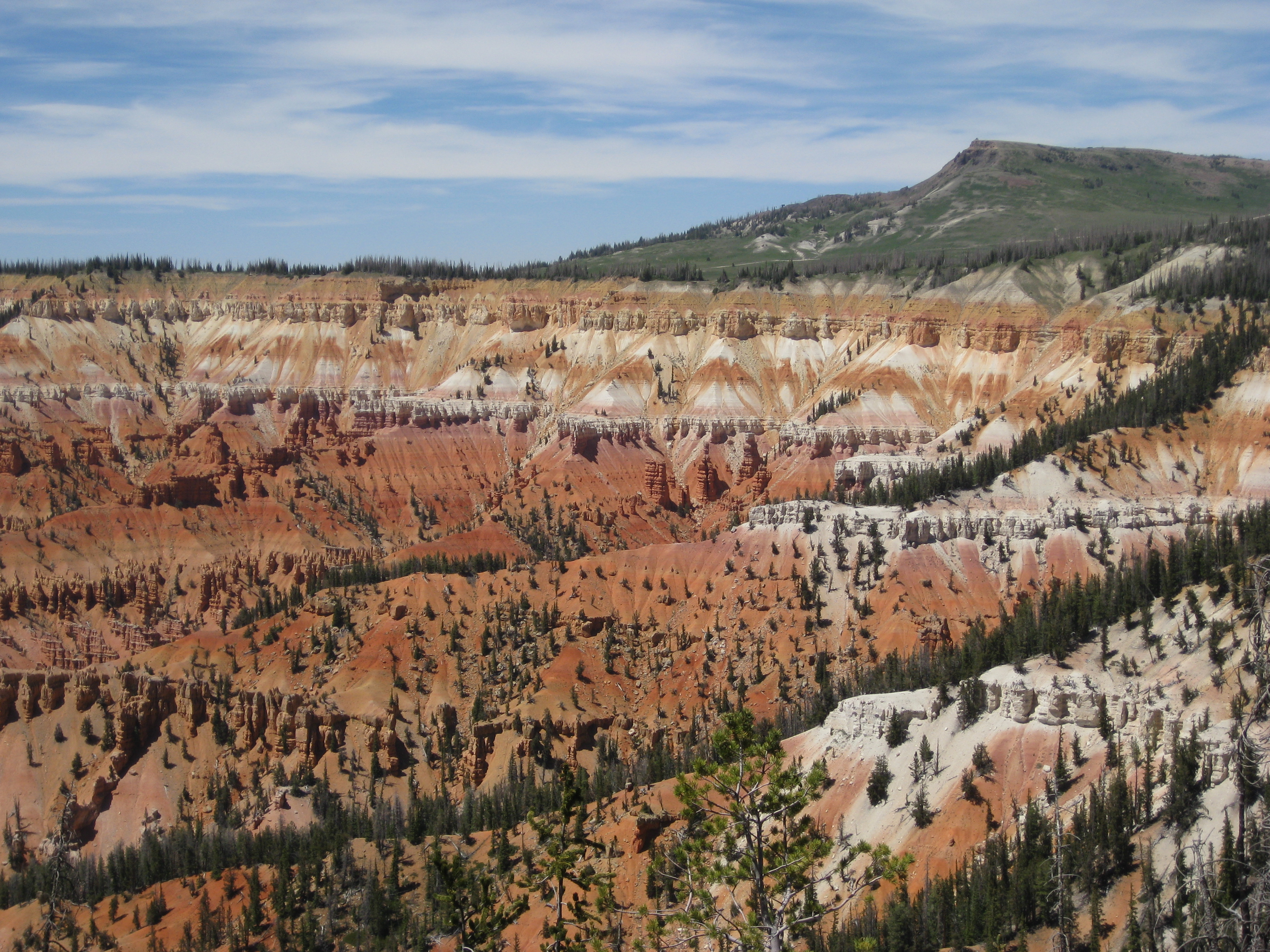
Brian Head

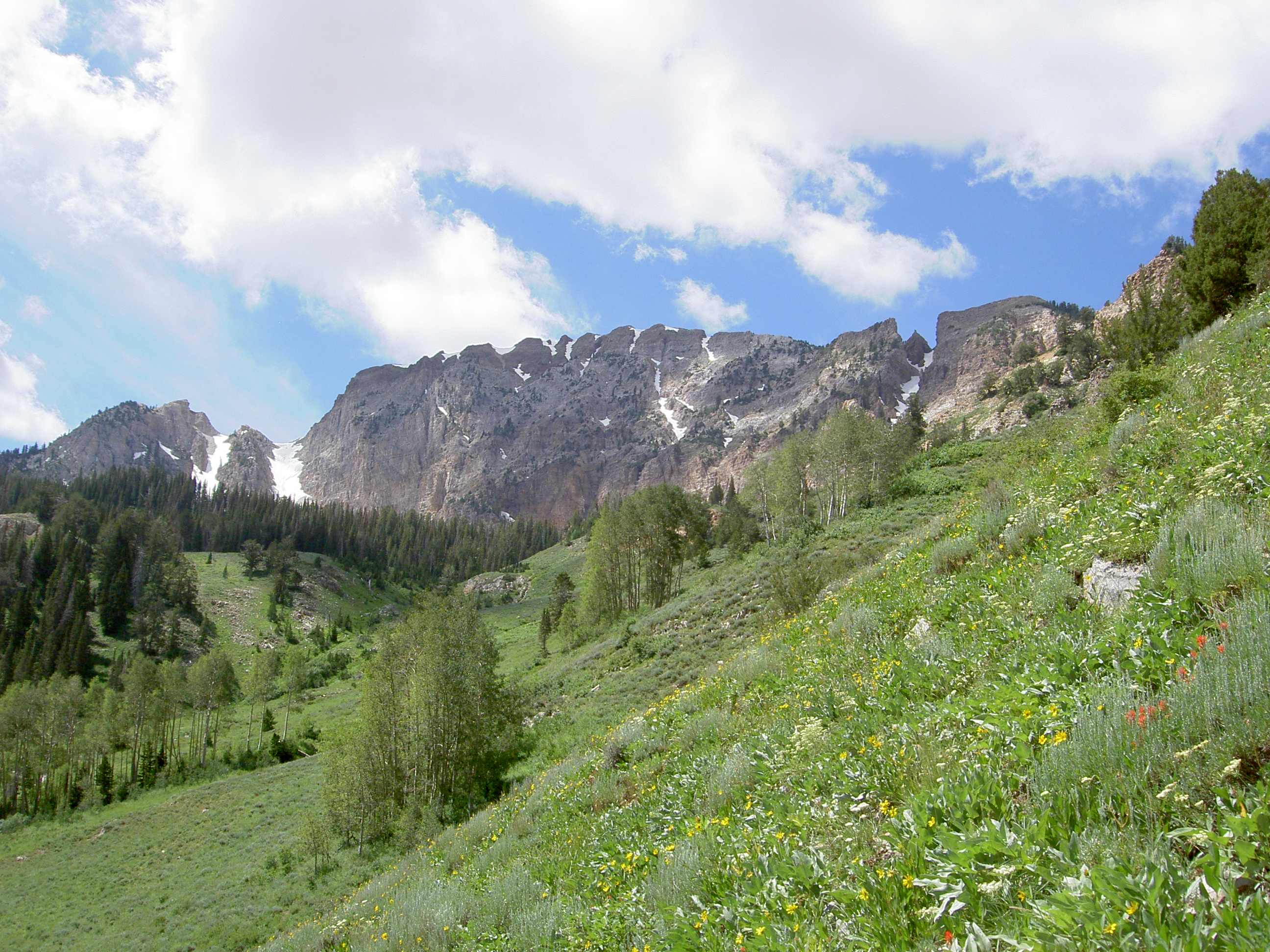
Deseret Peak

== See also ==
- List of mountain peaks of North America
  - List of mountain peaks of Greenland
  - List of mountain peaks of Canada
  - List of mountain peaks of the Rocky Mountains
  - List of mountain peaks of the United States
    - List of mountain peaks of Alaska
    - List of mountain peaks of Arizona
    - List of mountain peaks of California
    - List of mountain peaks of Colorado
    - List of mountain peaks of Hawaiʻi
    - List of mountain peaks of Idaho
    - List of mountain peaks of Montana
    - List of mountain peaks of Nevada
    - List of mountain peaks of New Mexico
    - List of mountain peaks of Oregon
    - List of mountain peaks of Utah
      - List of mountains of the United States § Utah
      - List of mountains in Utah
      - List of mountain ranges of Utah
    - List of mountain peaks of Washington (state)
    - List of mountain peaks of Wyoming
  - List of mountain peaks of México
  - List of mountain peaks of Central America
  - List of mountain peaks of the Caribbean
- Utah
  - Geography of Utah
    - Category:Mountains of Utah
      - commons:Category:Mountains of Utah
- Physical geography
  - Topography
    - Topographic elevation
    - Topographic prominence
    - Topographic isolation
