= Spanish Fork Peak =

Mountain peak in Utah, United States

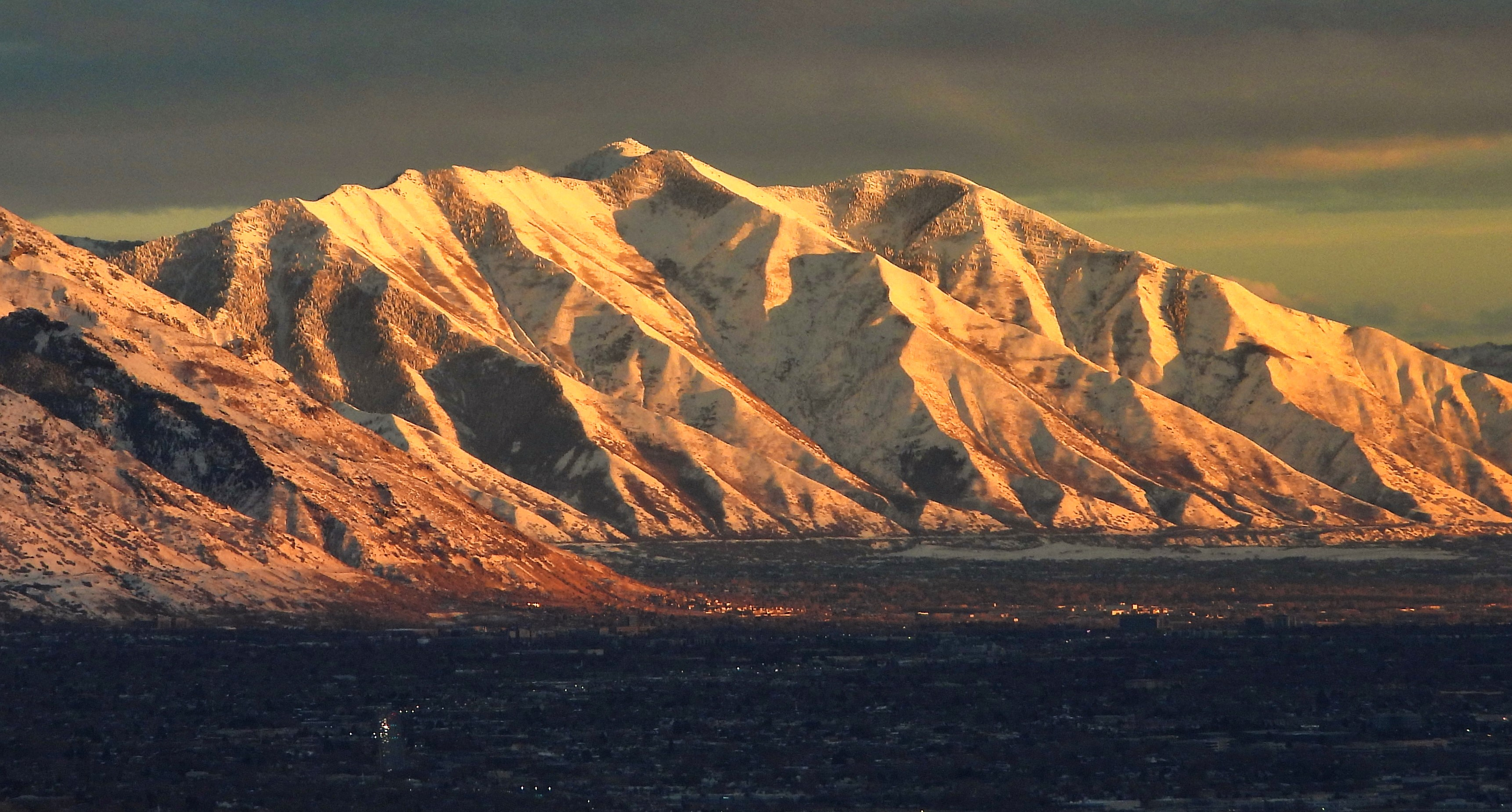
- NNW aspect, at sunset in winter

Highest point
- Elevation: 10,192 ft (3,107 m)
- Prominence: 2,972 ft (906 m)
- Parent peak: Strawberry Peak (10,335 ft)
- Isolation: 8.84 mi (14.23 km)
- Listing: Highest major summits of the US
- Coordinates: 40°05′17″N 111°31′40″W

Naming
- Etymology: Spanish Fork (river)

Geography
- Location within Utah Location within the United States
- Country: United States
- State: Utah
- County: Utah County
- Protected area: Uinta National Forest
- Parent range: Wasatch Range; Rocky Mountains
- Topo map: USGS Spanish Fork Peak

Climbing
- Easiest route: class 1 hiking

Spanish Fork Peak is a 10,192-foot elevation (3,107 m) mountain summit located in Utah County, Utah, United States.

== Description ==
Spanish Fork Peak is set in the Uinta National Forest and is situated in the Wasatch Range which is a subrange of the Rocky Mountains. The city of Spanish Fork lies six miles (9.7 km) to the west and 5,600 feet (1,700 meters) lower than the summit. Precipitation runoff from the mountain's north slope drains to Maple Canyon, whereas the south slope drains to the Spanish Fork River, and all flows to Utah Lake. Topographic relief is significant as the summit rises 5,200 feet (1,600 meters) above the Wasatch Front in 2.5 miles (4.0 km). An ascent of the summit involves hiking 8.5 miles (13.7 km) (round-trip) with 4,870 feet (1,480 meters) of elevation gain via the Sterling Hollow Trail.

== History ==
This mountain's toponym has been officially adopted by the United States Board on Geographic Names. The city and mountain are named after the river. Mapleton residents call the mountain "Maple Mountain" and Maple Mountain High School also refers to this landform.

== Climate ==
According to the Köppen climate classification system, Spanish Fork Peak is located in a dry-summer continental climate zone with cold, snowy winters, and hot, dry summers. Due to its altitude, it receives precipitation as snow in winter and as thunderstorms in summer.

== See also ==
- List of mountain peaks of Utah
- List of mountains in Utah

== Gallery ==
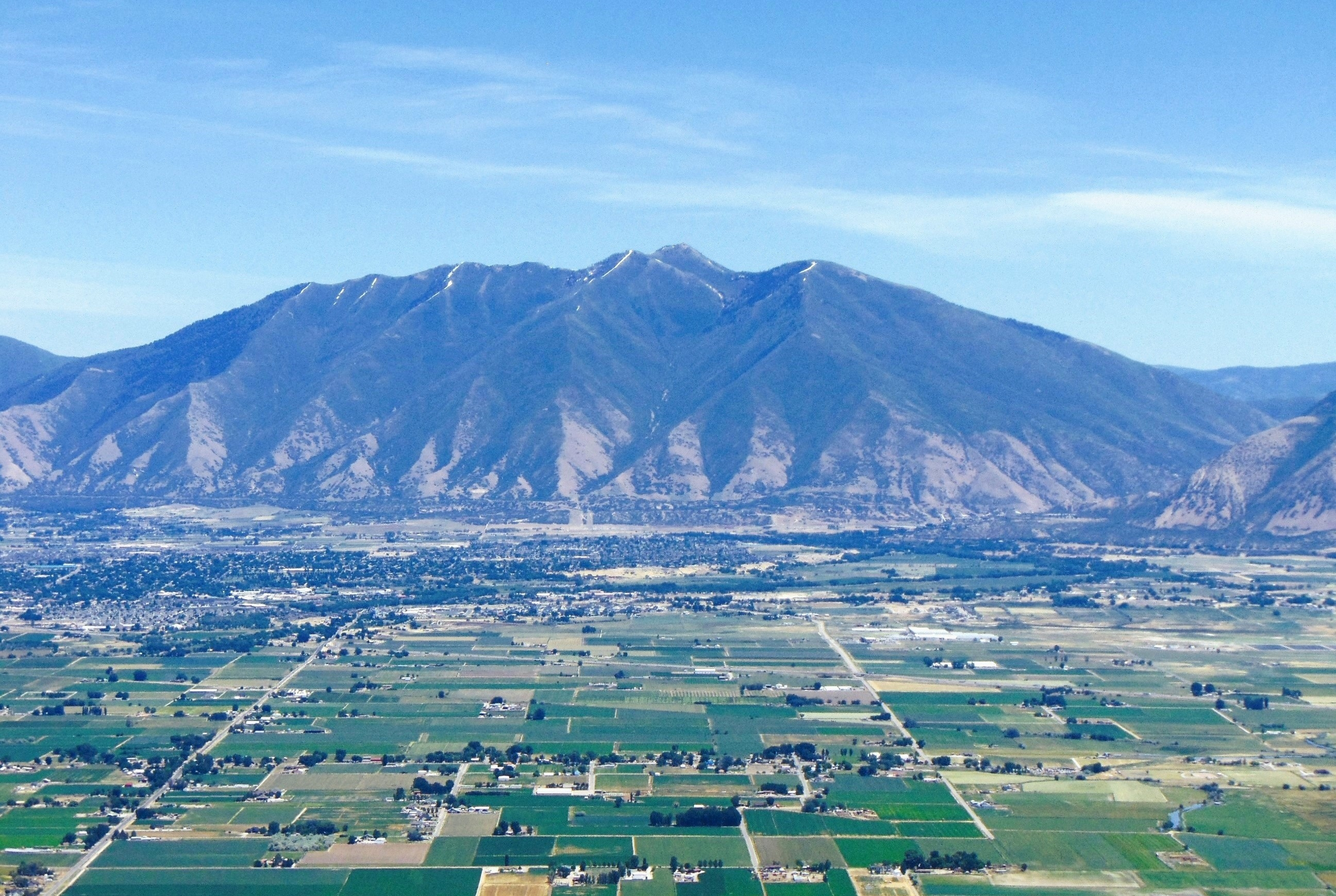
West aspect

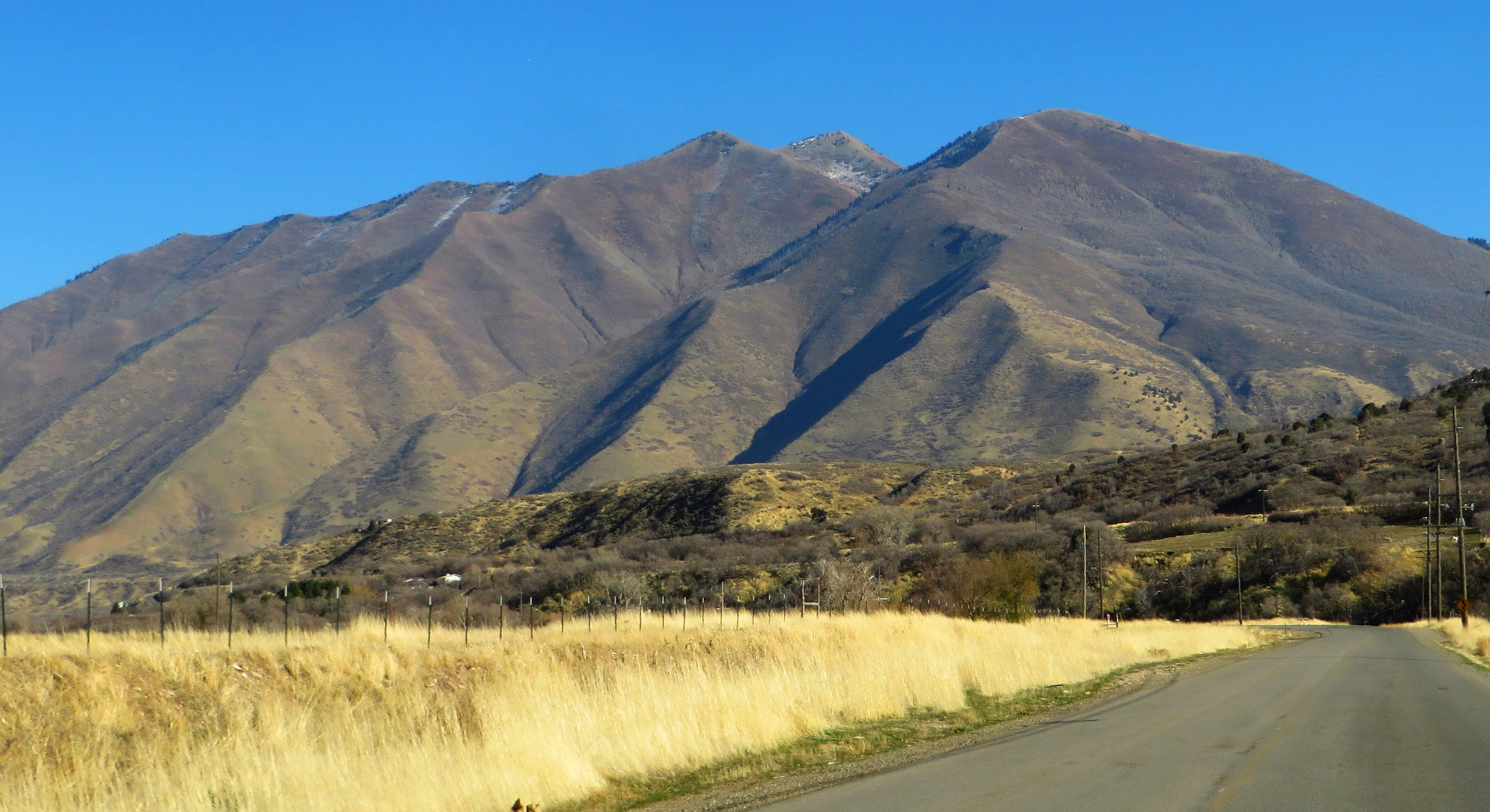
West-southwest aspect

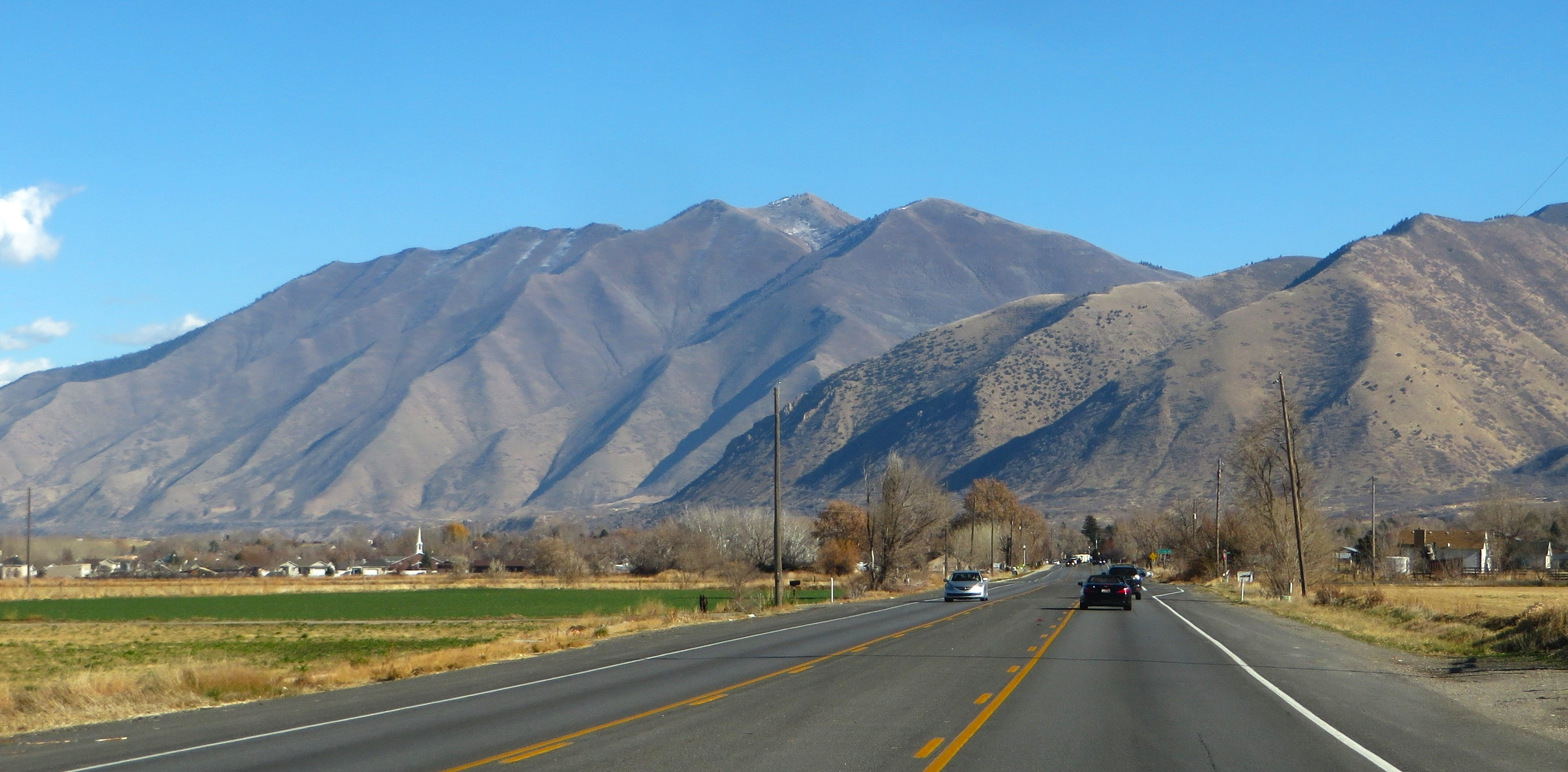
West-southwest aspect

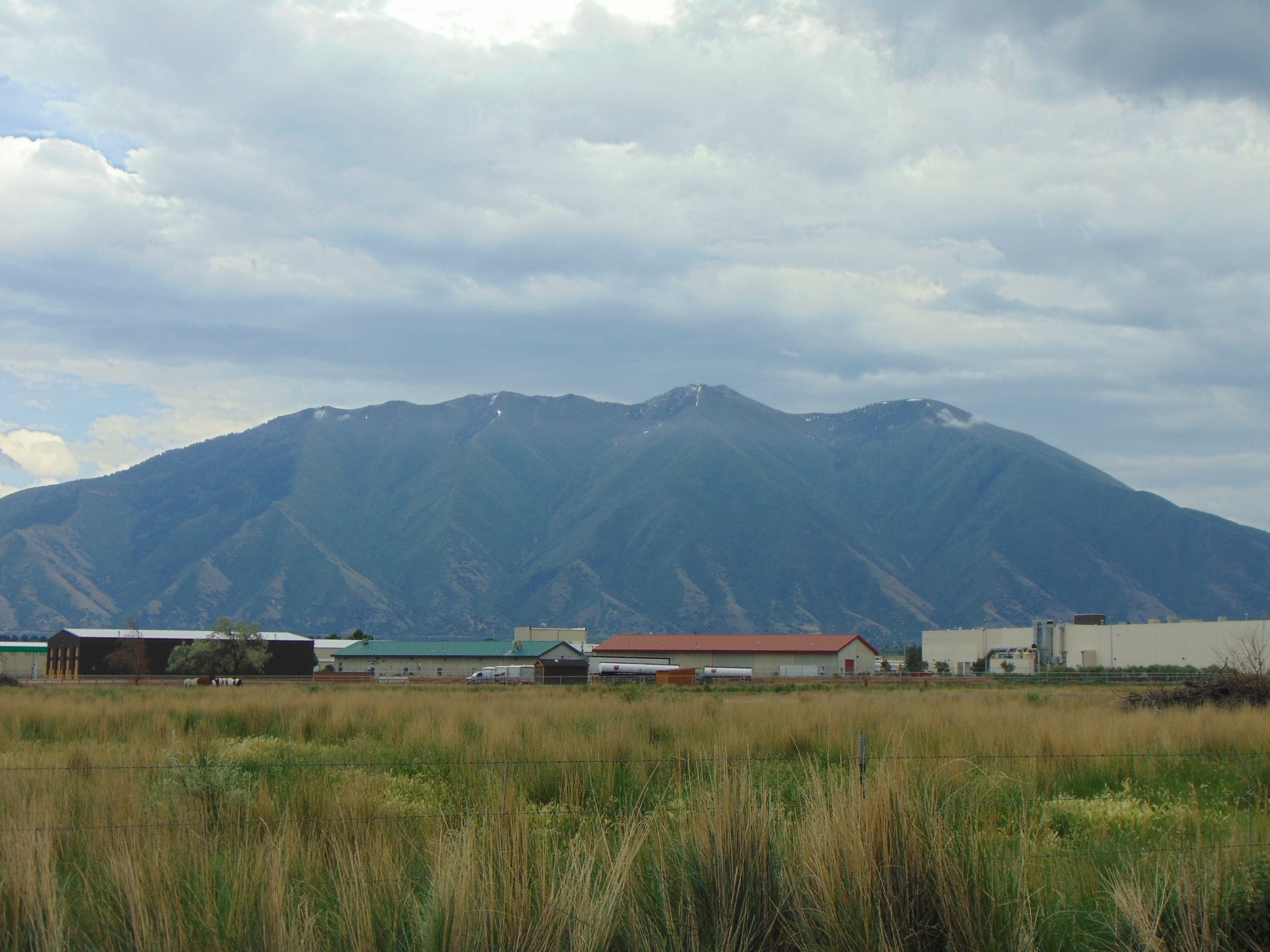
Northwest aspect
