= Provo Peak =

Mountain in Utah, United States

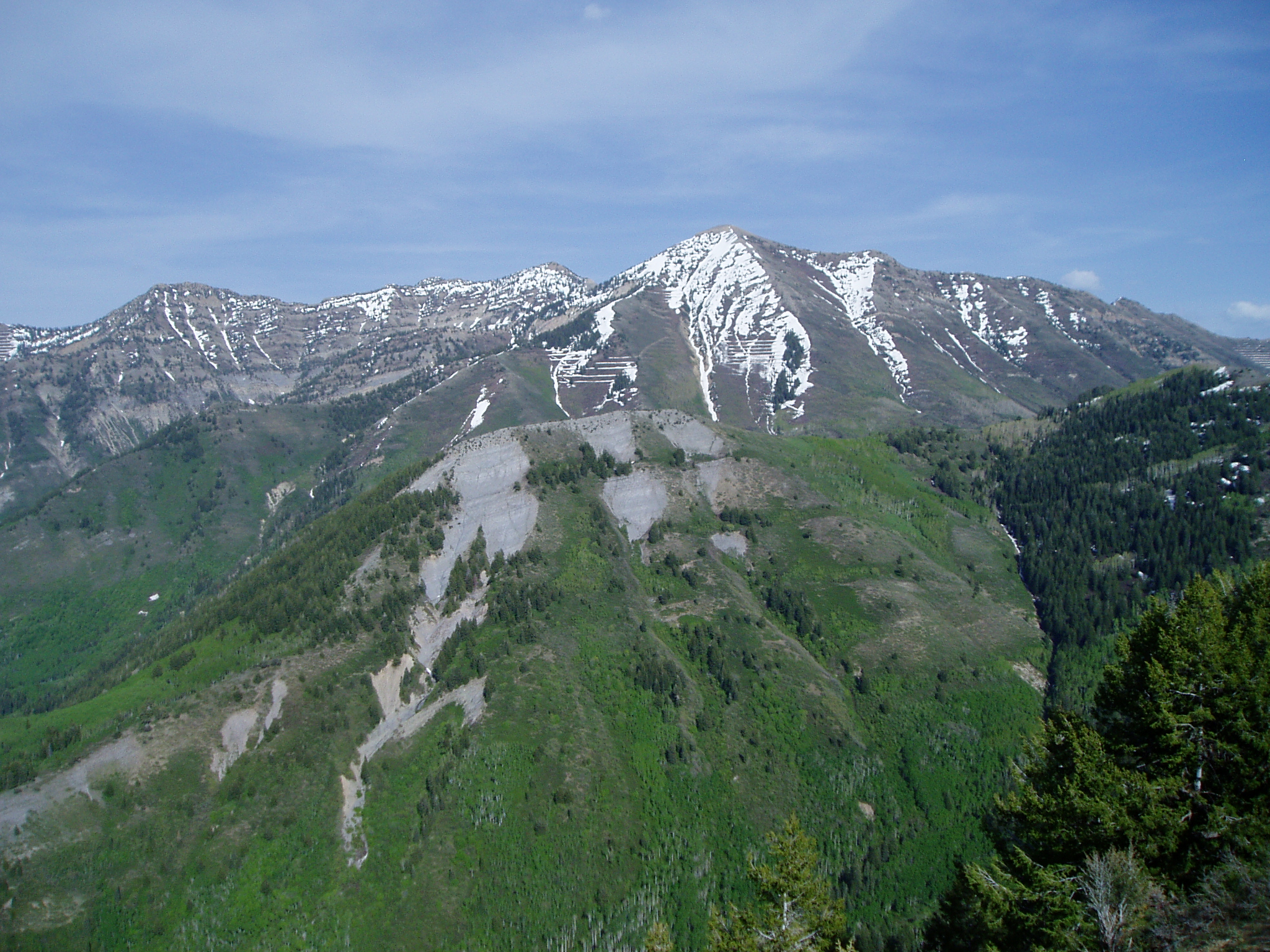
- Provo Peak from atop Y Mountain, May 2007

Highest point
- Elevation: 11,068 ft (3,374 m)
- Prominence: 3,442 ft (1,049 m)
- Coordinates: 40°14′40″N 111°33′24″W

Geography
- Location within Utah
- Location: Provo, Utah; United States
- Parent range: Wasatch Range

Provo Peak is a mountain peak located in the Wasatch Range and the Uinta National Forest that is located within the city limits of Provo, Utah, United States. The peak has an elevation of 11,068 feet (3,374 m), but a prominence of only 3,442 feet (1,049 m). Although located along the Wasatch Front, it is situated behind (east-southeast) of Y Mountain.

The trapper Étienne Provost is the peak's namesake, also of the city of Provo. Near the top of the peak are multiple parallel terraces that can be easily seen from the valley floor from the west or south. These were created in the 1930s by CCC workers to reduce the severe erosion caused by overgrazing on the slopes of the peak.

== See also ==
- List of mountains of Utah
- List of mountain peaks of Utah
