= Cleveland Peak =

Mountain in Colorado, United States

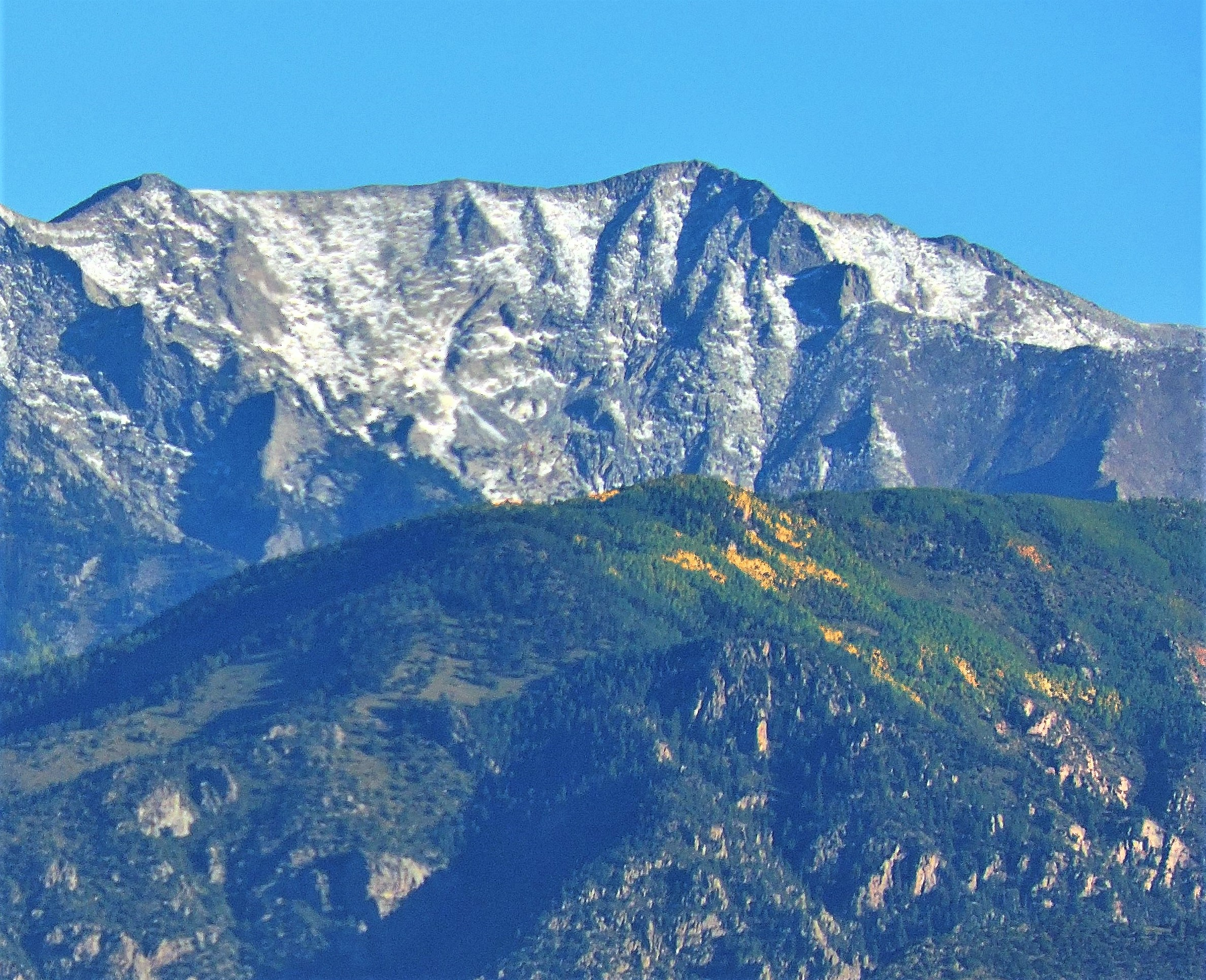
- West aspect

Highest point
- Elevation: 13,414 ft (4,089 m)
- Prominence: 450 ft (137 m)
- Parent peak: Tijeras Peak (13,610 ft)
- Isolation: 1.40 mi (2.25 km)
- Coordinates: 37°54′16″N 105°32′36″W

Geography
- Location within Colorado Location within the United States
- Country: United States
- State: Colorado
- County: Saguache
- Protected area: Sangre de Cristo Wilderness; Great Sand Dunes Preserve
- Parent range: Rocky Mountains; Sangre de Cristo Range
- Topo map: USGS Crestone Peak

Geology
- Rock age: Precambrian
- Mountain type: Fault block

Climbing
- Easiest route: class 2+

Cleveland Peak is a 13,414-foot (4,089 m) mountain summit in Saguache County, Colorado, United States.

== Description ==
Cleveland Peak is set in the Sangre de Cristo Range which is a subrange of the Rocky Mountains. The mountain is located on the boundary shared by Sangre de Cristo Wilderness and Great Sand Dunes National Park and Preserve. Precipitation runoff from the mountain's eastern slopes drains to Sand Creek, the west slope drains into Pole and Deadman creeks, and all three flow into the San Luis Valley. Topographic relief is significant as the summit rises 1,700 feet (518 m) above Deadman Lakes in one-half mile (0.8 km) and nearly 4,600 feet (1,402 m) above Sand Creek in 2.5 miles (4.0 km). The mountain's toponym has been officially adopted by the United States Board on Geographic Names.

== Climate ==
According to the Köppen climate classification system, Cleveland Peak has an alpine climate with cold, snowy winters, and cool to warm summers. Due to its altitude, it receives precipitation all year, as snow in winter and as thunderstorms in summer, with a dry period in late spring. Climbers can expect afternoon rain, hail, and lightning from the seasonal monsoon in late July and August.

== Gallery ==
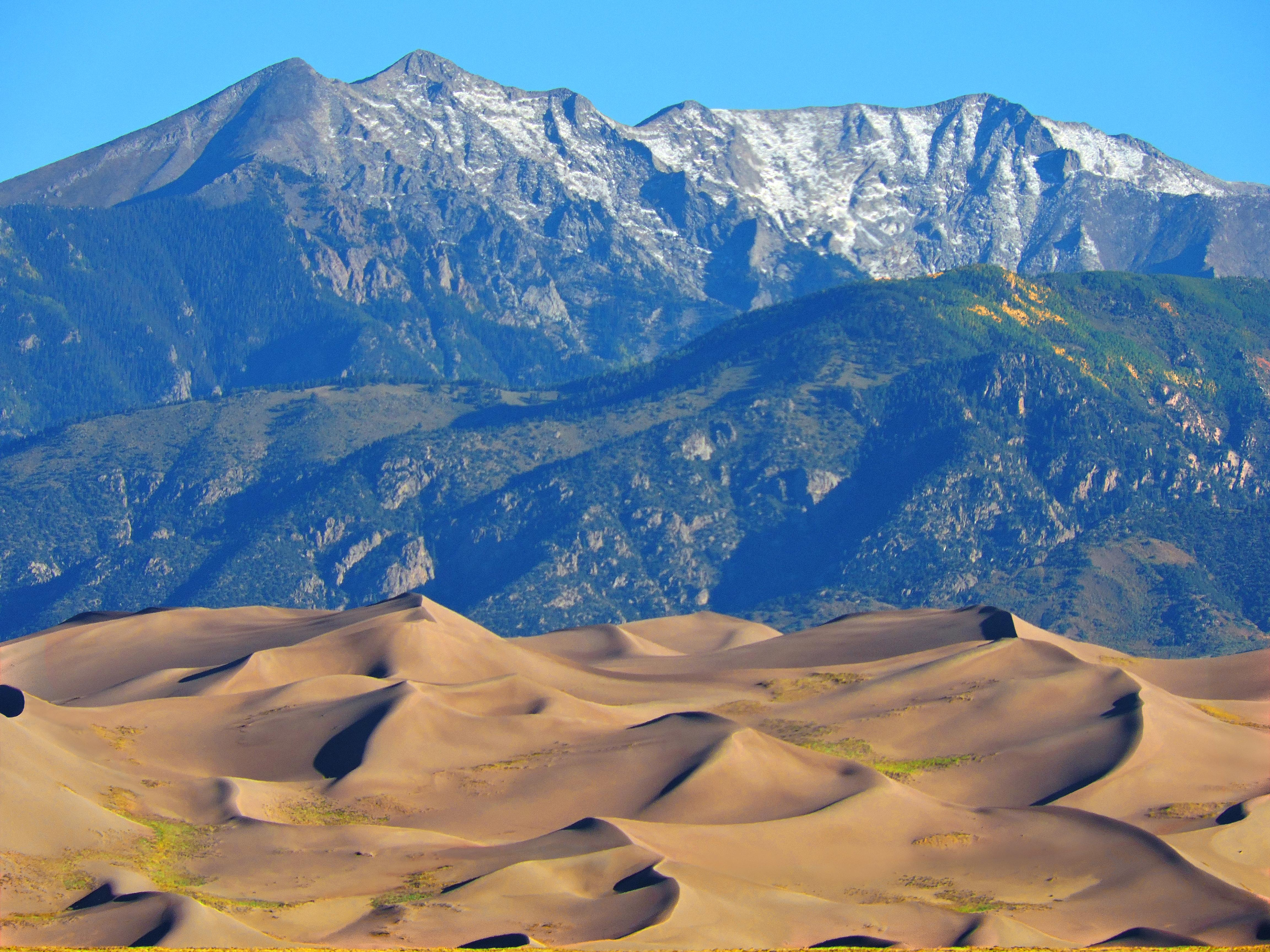
Cleveland Peak and Great Sand Dunes

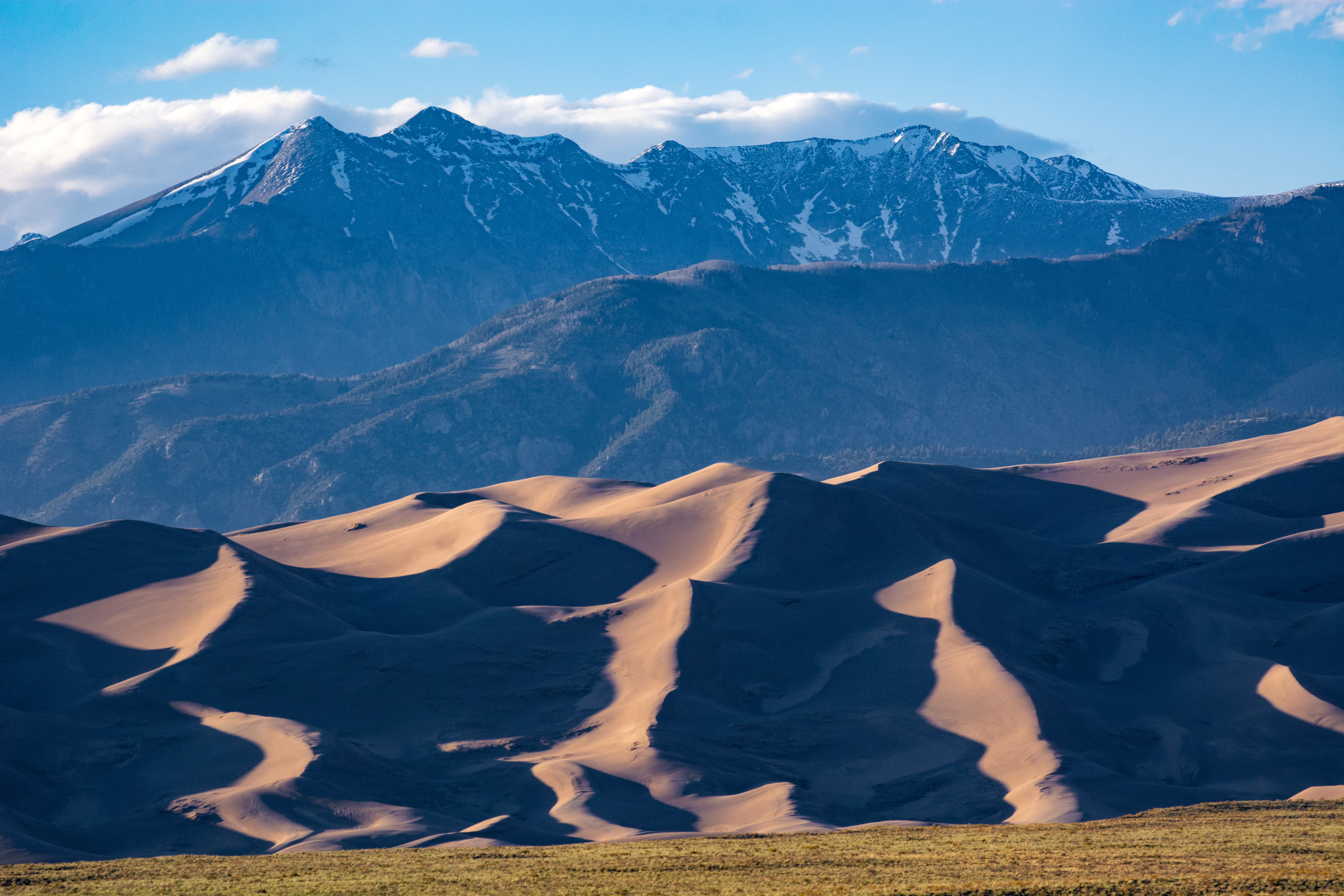
Cleveland Peak and Great Sand Dunes

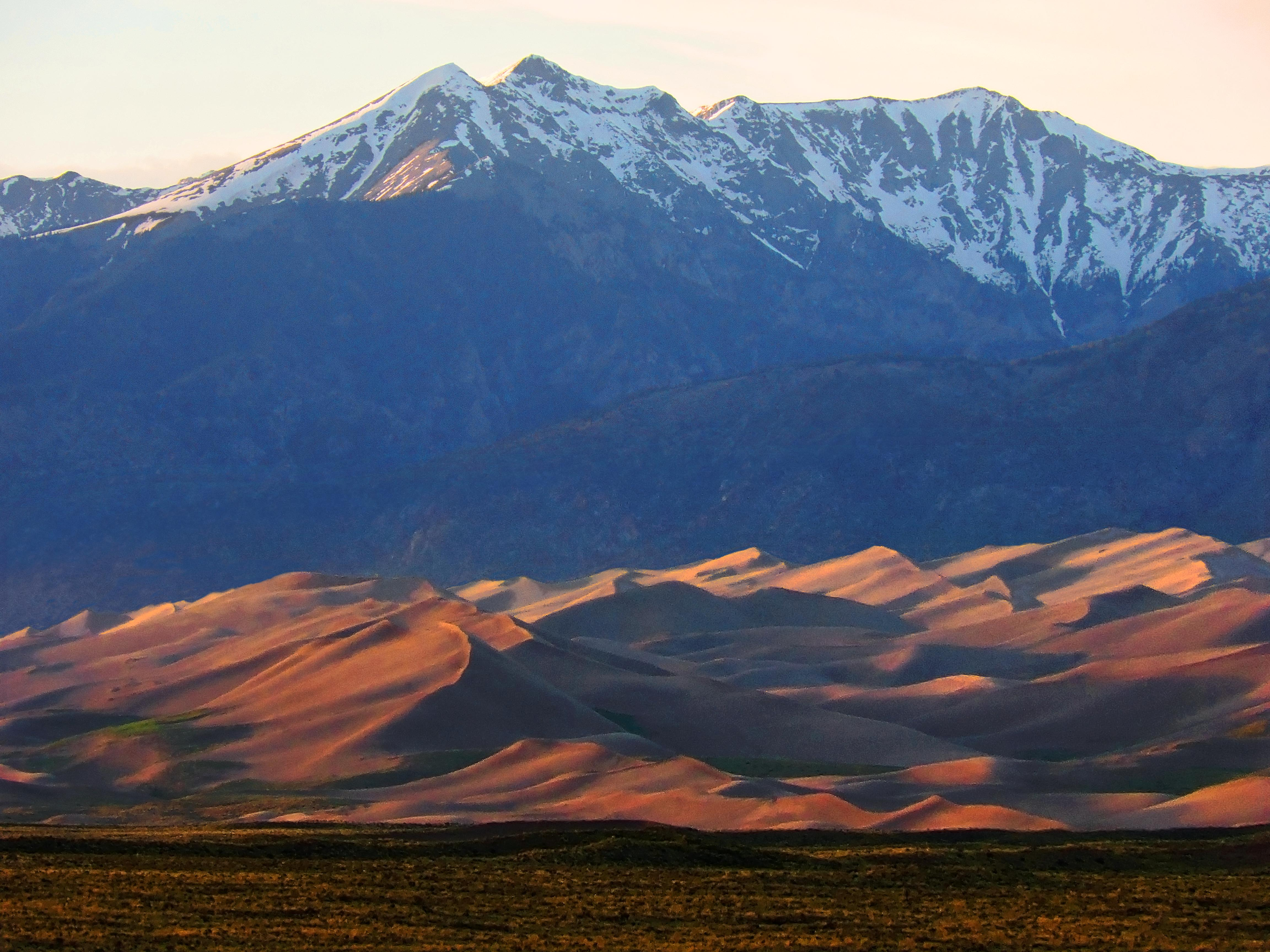
Great Sand Dunes and Cleveland Peak

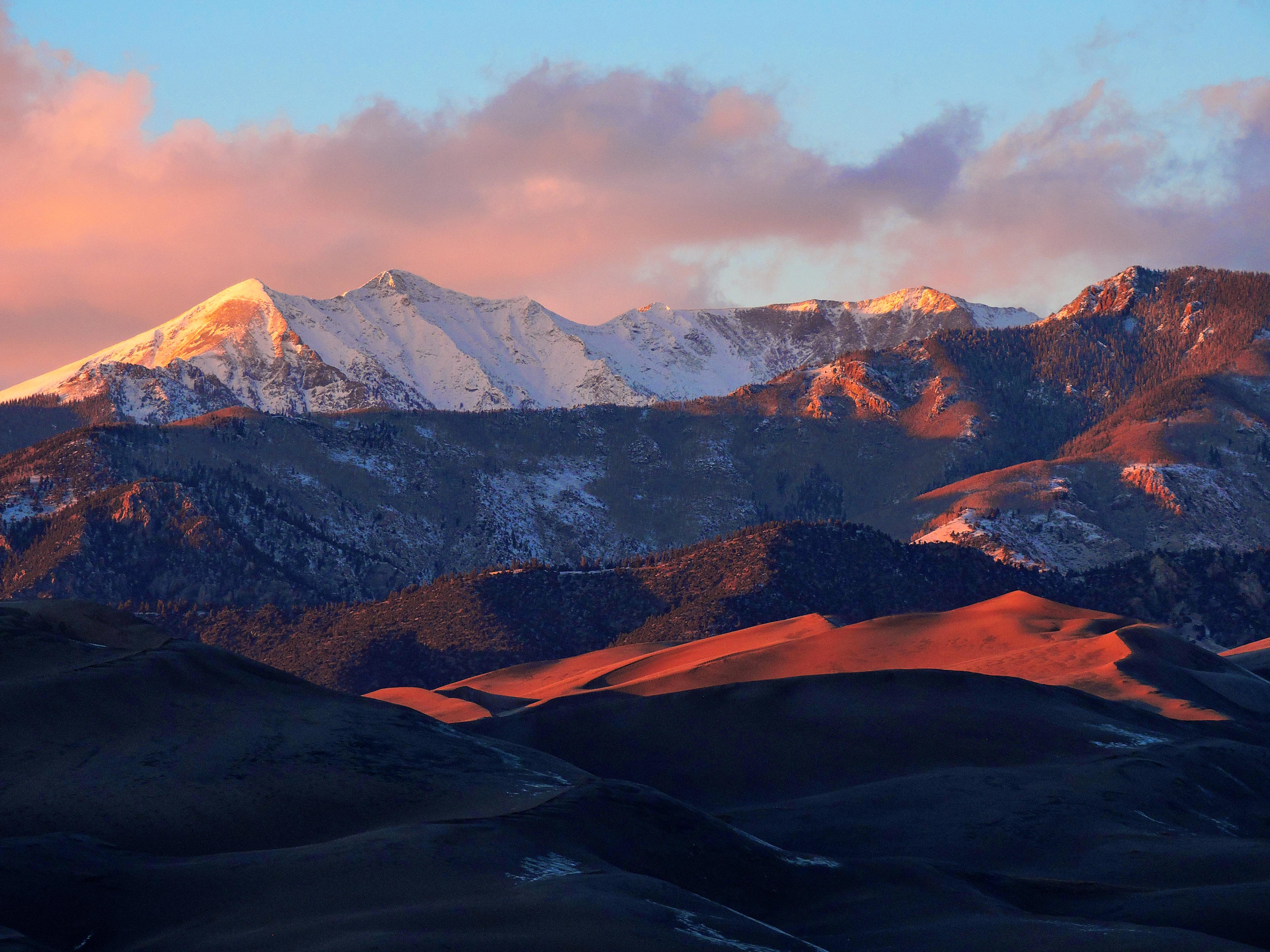
Cleveland Peak at sunset

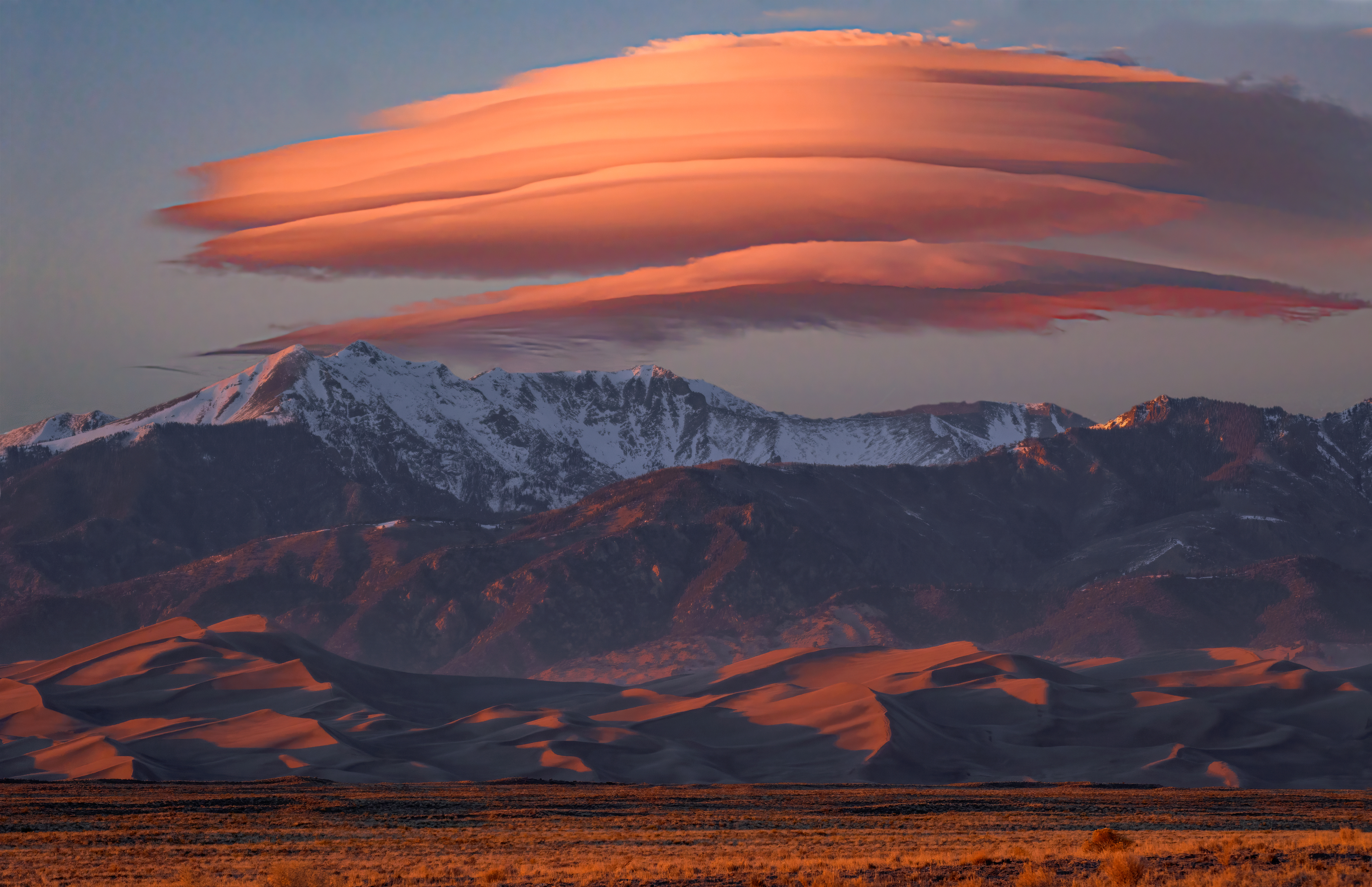
Lenticular cloud over Cleveland Peak at sunset

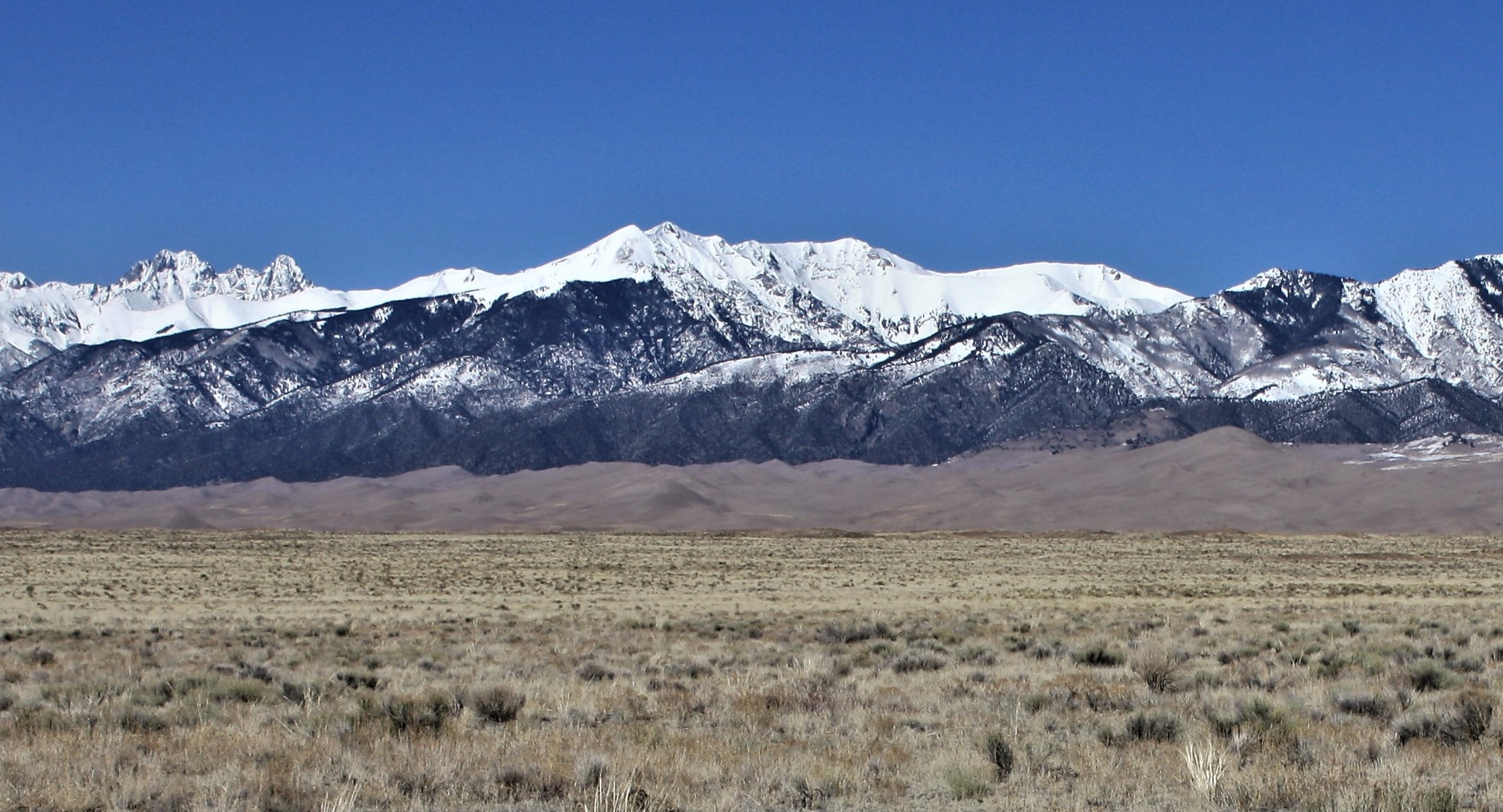
Cleveland Peak centered and the Crestones to the left

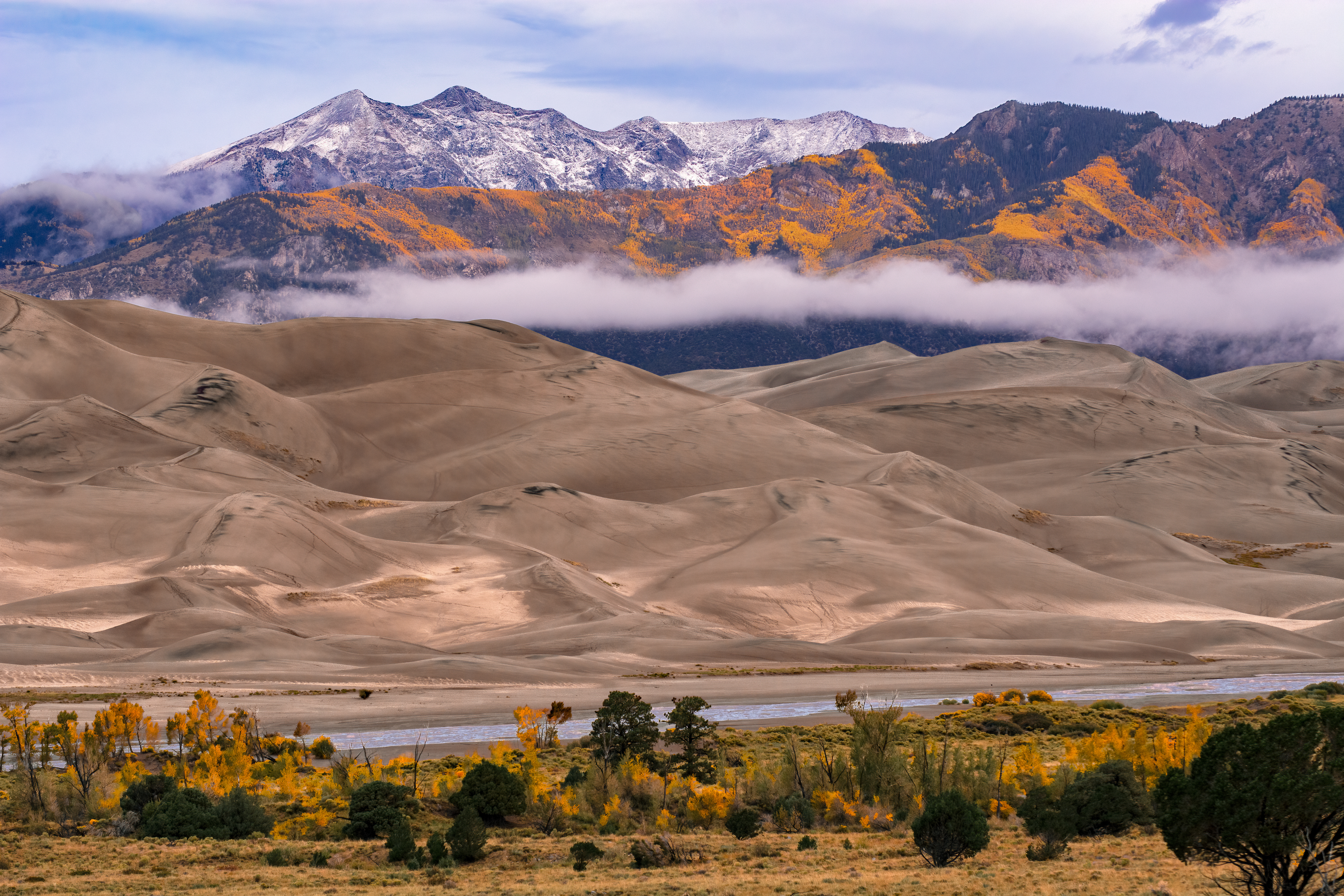
Great Sand Dunes and Cleveland Peak

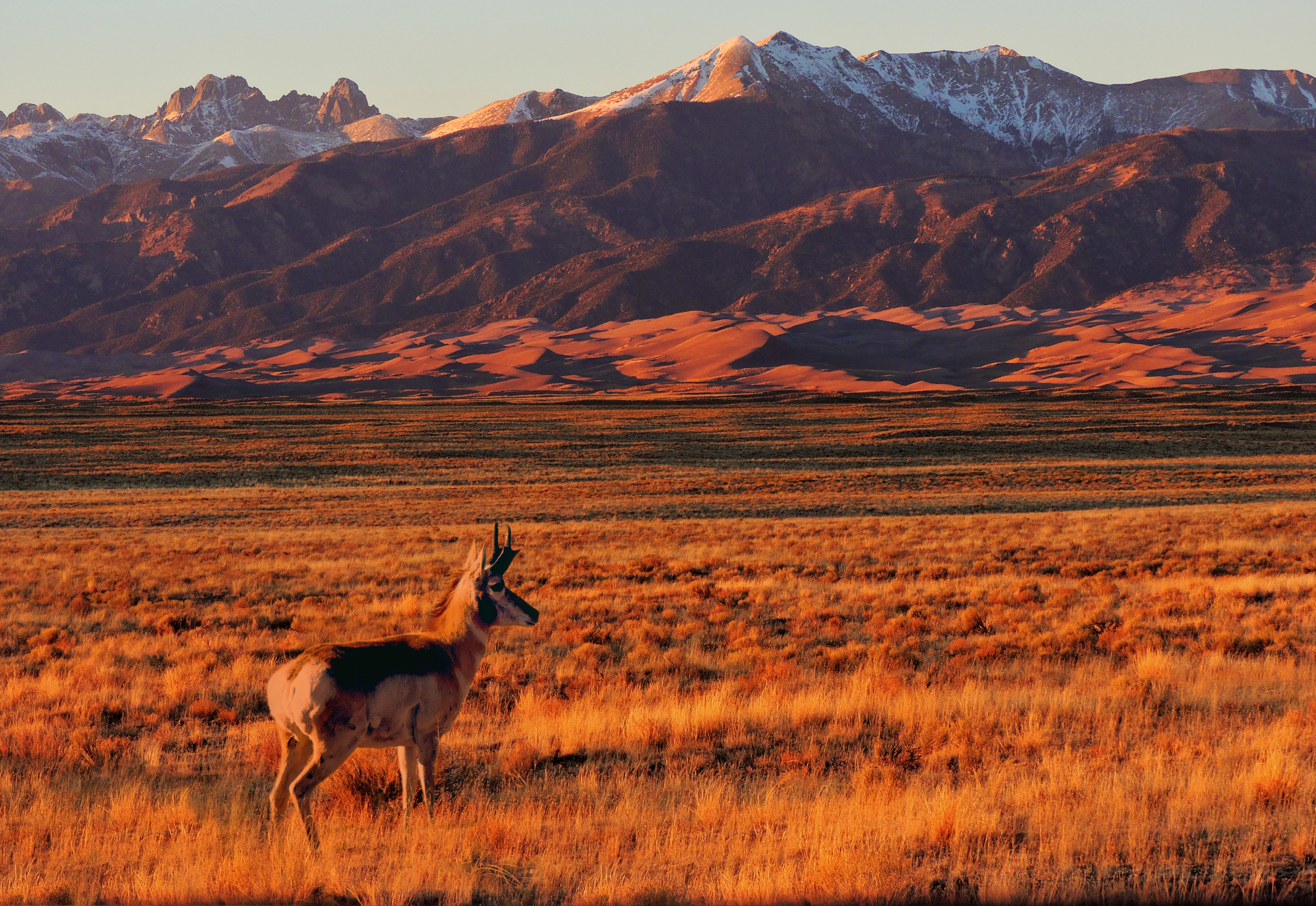
Cleveland Peak to right and the Crestones to the left

== See also ==
- Sangre de Cristo Mountains
- Thirteener
