= Fool Creek Peak =

Mountain peak in Utah, United States

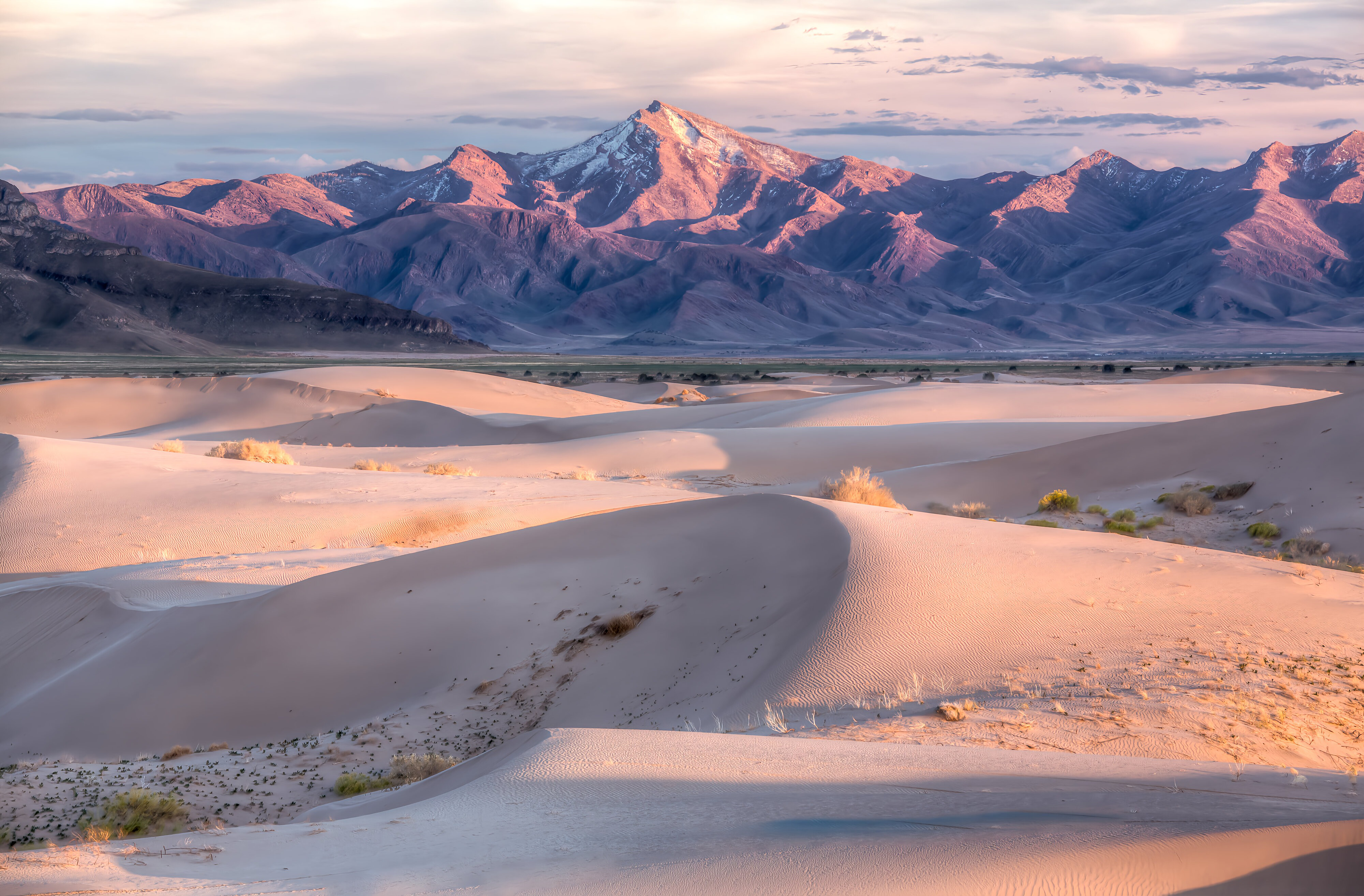
- North aspect centered on horizon

Highest point
- Elevation: 9,719 ft (2,962 m)
- Prominence: 3,764 ft (1,147 m)
- Isolation: 23.15 mi (37.26 km)
- Coordinates: 39°23′33″N 112°12′27″W

Geography
- Location within Utah Location within the United States
- Country: United States
- State: Utah
- County: Millard
- Protected area: Fishlake National Forest
- Parent range: Canyon Mountains
- Topo map: USGS Fool Creek Peak

Fool Creek Peak (also known as Fool Peak and Scipio Peak) is a mountain peak in Fishlake National Forest in the state of Utah in the United States. At 9,719 feet high, it's the highest peak in the Canyon Mountains. A tower is on the top of the peak.
