= Red Castle (Utah) =

Mountain summit in Summit County, Utah

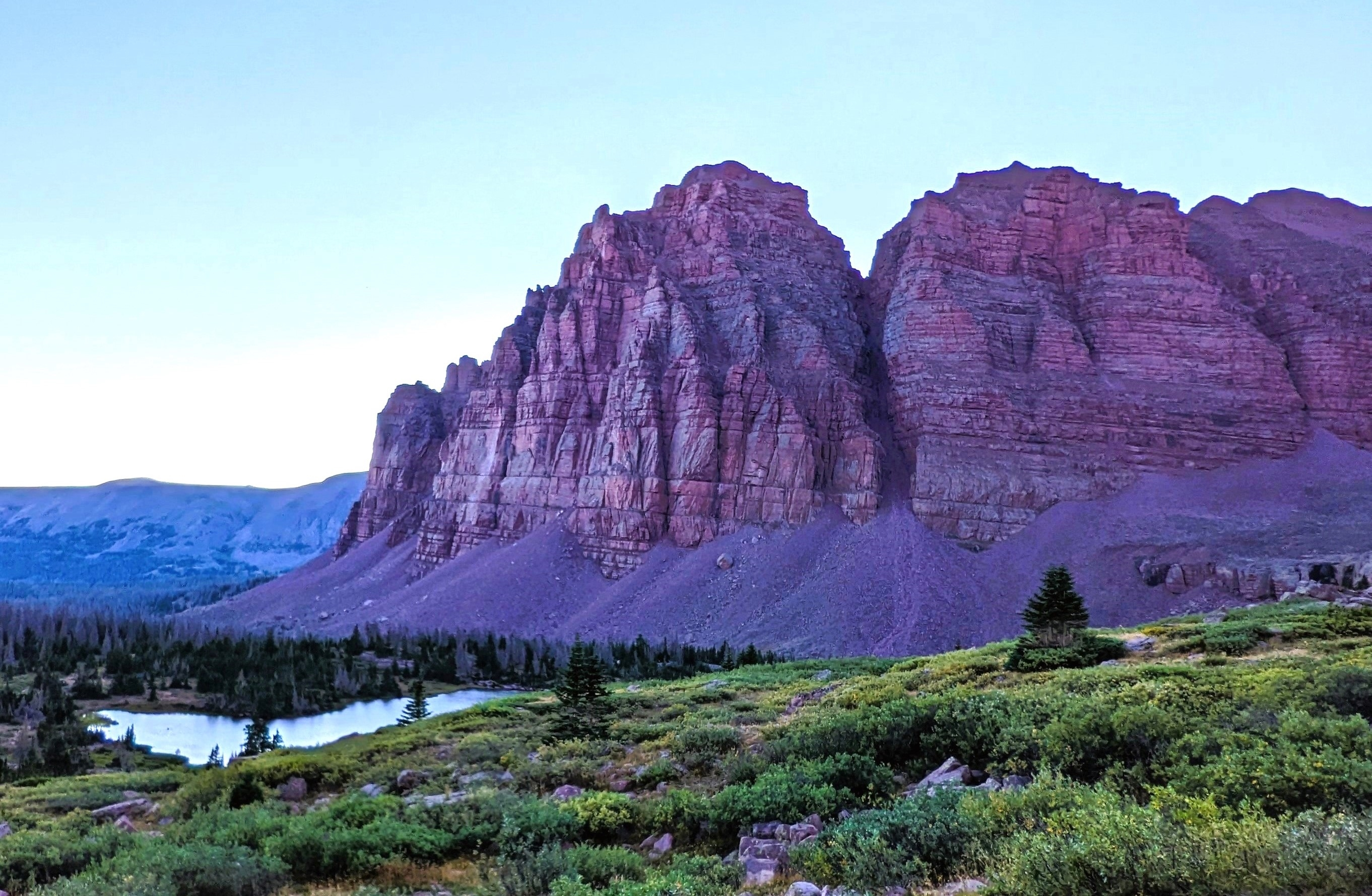
- West aspect

Highest point
- Elevation: 12,676 ft (3,864 m)
- Prominence: 457 ft (139 m)
- Parent peak: South Red Castle (12,829 ft)
- Isolation: 0.52 mi (0.84 km)
- Coordinates: 40°47′54″N 110°27′57″W

Geography
- Location within Utah Location within the United States
- Country: United States of America
- State: Utah
- County: Summit
- Protected area: High Uintas Wilderness
- Parent range: Uinta Mountains; Rocky Mountains
- Topo map: USGS Mount Powell

Geology
- Rock age: Neoproterozoic
- Rock type: Metasedimentary rock

Climbing
- Easiest route: class 4 scrambling

Red Castle is a 12,676-foot-elevation (3,864-meter) mountain summit in Summit County, Utah, United States.

== Description ==
Red Castle is set within the High Uintas Wilderness on land managed by Uinta-Wasatch-Cache National Forest. It is situated on a spur along the crest of the Uinta Mountains which are a subset of the Rocky Mountains, and it ranks as the 36th-highest summit in Utah. It is one of the most distinct and photogenic landforms in the Uinta Mountains, and it is considered the crown jewel of the range. Topographic relief is significant as the summit rises 1,500 feet (457 meters) above East Red Castle Lake in one-half mile (0.8 km). Precipitation runoff from this mountain drains north to Smiths Fork → Blacks Fork → Green River. The mountain's descriptive toponym has been officially adopted by the U.S. Board on Geographic Names.

== Climate ==
Based on the Köppen climate classification, Red Castle is located in a subarctic climate zone with cold snowy winters and mild summers. Tundra climate characterizes the summit and highest slopes.

== See also ==
- Geology of the Uinta Mountains
- List of mountains in Utah
