= Abajo Peak =

Mountain in Utah, United States

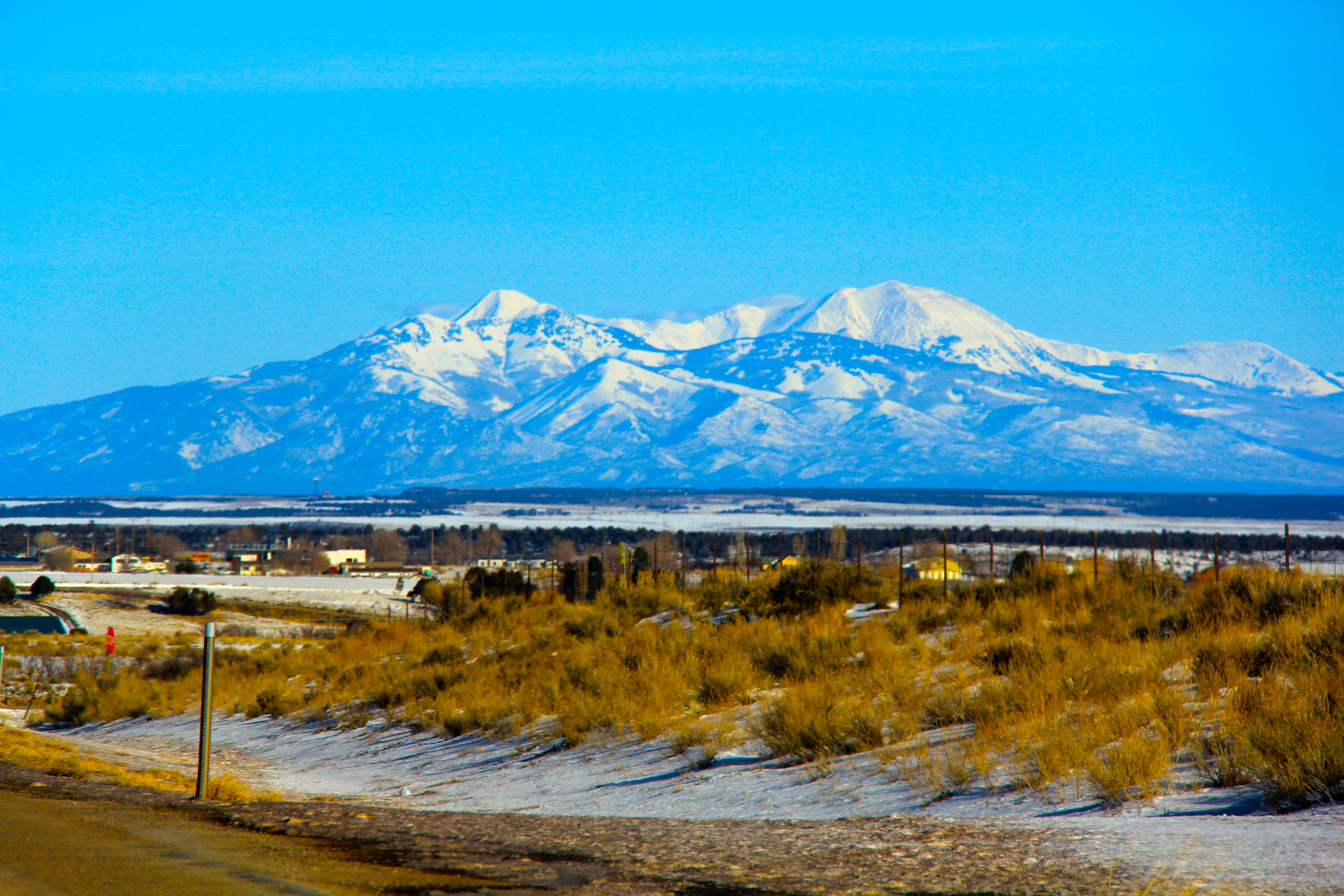

Highest point
- Elevation: 11,368 ft (3,465 m) NAVD 88
- Prominence: 4,550 ft (1,387 m)
- Coordinates: 37°50′22″N 109°27′45″W

Geography
- Location within Utah
- Location: San Juan County, Utah, U.S.
- Parent range: Abajo Mountains
- Topo map: USGS Abajo Peak Quad

Climbing
- Easiest route: Hike

Abajo Peak is the highest peak in the Abajo Mountains of southeast Utah, United States and is located in the Manti-La Sal National Forest. The summit is 7 miles (11 km) southwest of Monticello, Utah and 23 miles (37 km) west of the Colorado border. There are several communication towers on the peak.
