= Abajo Mountains =

Mountain range in San Juan County, Utah, USA

- Blue Mountains
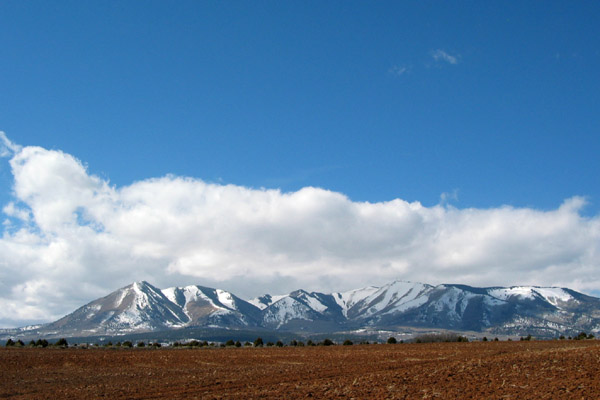
- Abajo Mountains near Monticello, Utah

Highest point
- Peak: Abajo Peak
- Elevation: 11,368 ft (3,465 m) NAVD 88
- Prominence: 4,550 ft (1,390 m)
- Coordinates: 37°50′52″N 109°32′47″W

Geography
- Location within Utah
- Country: United States
- State: Utah
- County: San Juan
- Settlements: Monticello East and Blanding South
- Parent range: Colorado Plateau

Geology
- Rock age: 22–29 million years
- Rock type: Laccolithic intrusions

Climbing
- Access: Manti-La Sal National Forest

The Abajo Mountains, sometimes referred to as the Blue Mountains, are a small mountain range west of Monticello, Utah, south of Canyonlands National Park and north of Blanding, Utah. The mountain range is located within the Manti–La Sal National Forest. The highest point within the range is Abajo Peak at 11,368 feet (3,465 m).

This mountain range, like both the La Sal Range and Henry Mountains in the same part of the Colorado Plateau, is formed about igneous intrusions that are relatively resistant to erosion. Some of these intrusions form laccoliths emplaced at depths of a few kilometers. The predominant igneous rock is porphyritic hornblende diorite. Ages of intrusion in the Abajo Mountains fall in the interval from 22 to 29 million years.

These mountain ranges are part of the Colorado Plateau province west of the greater ranges of the Rocky Mountains. The laccolith ranges are much younger and have a very different geologic origin.

The range was reputedly named by the Spanish in the 1700s, the name "Abajo" meaning "low".

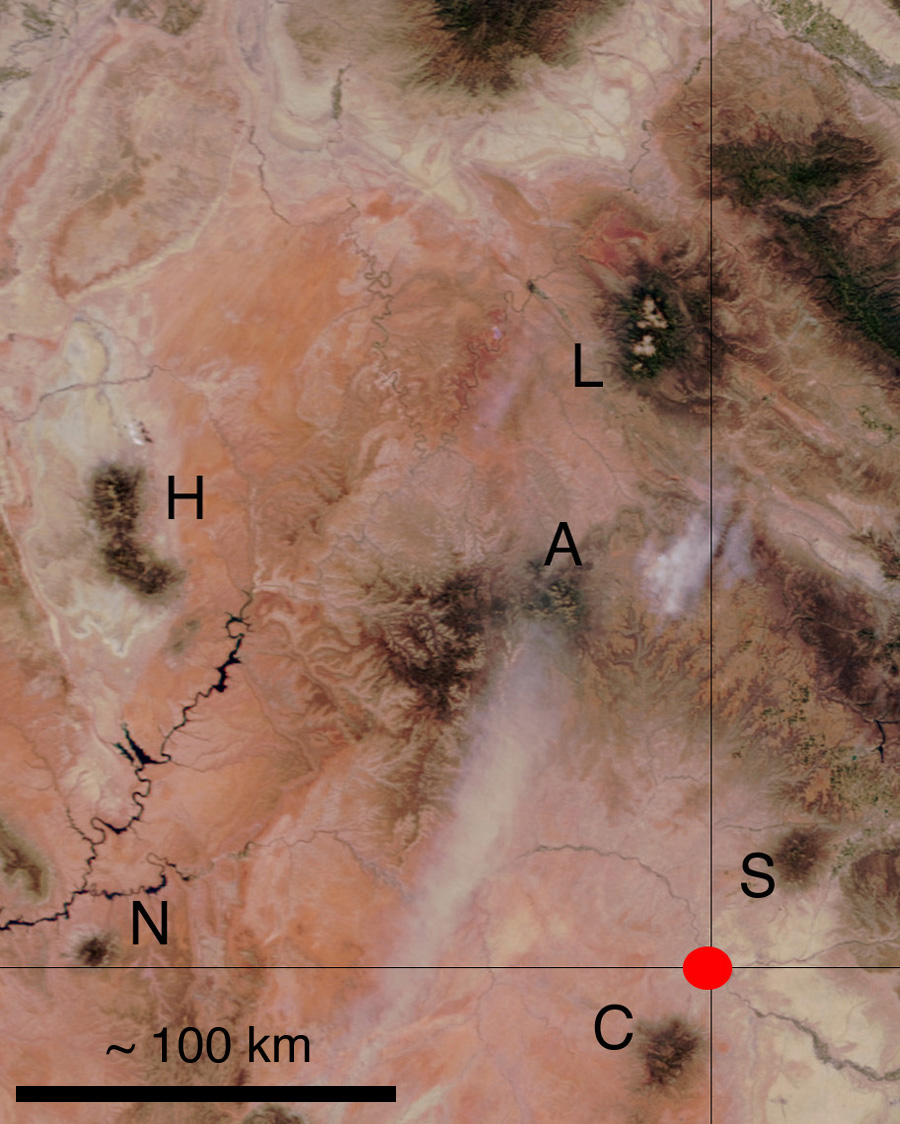
Mountain ranges associated with laccoliths and other igneous intrusions on the Colorado Plateau, southwestern United States. The red dot marks the Four Corners, the intersection of Utah, Colorado, New Mexico, and Arizona. L, La Sal Range; A, Abajo Mountains; S, (Sleeping) Ute Mountain; C, Carrizo Mountains; N, Navajo Mountain; H, Henry Mountains.
