= George Beard (artist) =

American photographer (1855-1944)

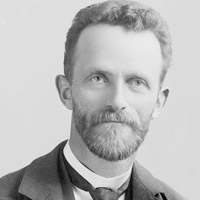
- Born: December 21, 1854; Cheshire, England
- Died: November 3, 1944 (aged 89); Coalville, Utah
- Spouse: Lovenia Bollock
- Children: 8

George Beard (December 21, 1854 – October 3, 1944) was an English-born photographer and artist in Utah. After emigrating from England, Beard spent the majority of his life running the Cooperative Mercantile in the town of Coalville in Summit County, Utah. He also served as a leader in politics and in his church community for the Church of Jesus Christ of Latter-day Saints. He is most well known for his art and photography skills, with his focus being in nature photography and watercolor painting. Many of his glass plate negative photos were donated to Brigham Young University (BYU) soon after his death. His work has been a part of two exhibits at BYU and the Springville Museum of Art in 1975 and 2017, respectively.

== Early life ==
George Beard was born December 21, 1854, in Cheshire, England. Some confusion exists surrounding his exact birth year as a family bible entry states that he was born in 1855, but his birth certificate states he was born in 1854. He was the youngest of 9 children born to Thomas Beard and Ellen Elizabeth Platt Clark. The family lived in extreme poverty and George's father was a blue collar laborer in their village. Before Beard's birth, his father, mother, and oldest brother found the Church of Jesus Christ of Latter-day Saints and were baptized. Their children born from that point on, including Beard, were baptized as well. The family decided to immigrate to the American West alongside many other LDS Europeans, and George embarked from Liverpool on June 20, 1868, for New York City with his mother and two of his sisters Mary Ann and Elizabeth.

Two weeks from the end of this journey, Beard's mother took a fall aboard the ship and sustained fatal injuries. She was buried at sea, and the Beard siblings continued their journey alone. Upon their arrival in New York City, the Beard children boarded a train to Wyoming where they joined a company of travelers heading to Utah. The journey took a little over three weeks, and they settled in Coalville, Summit County, Utah.

== Professional career and community involvement ==
=== Professional and civic careers ===
Beard was involved both professionally and personally in the Coalville community. He ran the Coalville Cooperative Mercantile Institution for 73 years, all the way until his death. He served as the mayor of Coalville from 1891 to 1892 and was elected for one term for the first Utah State Legislature in 1895 as a Republican. During his time in the legislature, he was on and eventually became the chairman of the committee that created the Utah State Seal. Beard also served as a choir and musical director for the Coalville Opera House.

=== Religious involvement ===
Beard's religion continued to be a pillar in his life into his adulthood. He served as a bishop for the Church of Jesus Christ of Latter-day Saints and raised his children as members of the church.

== Art and photography ==
=== Early inspiration and painting ===
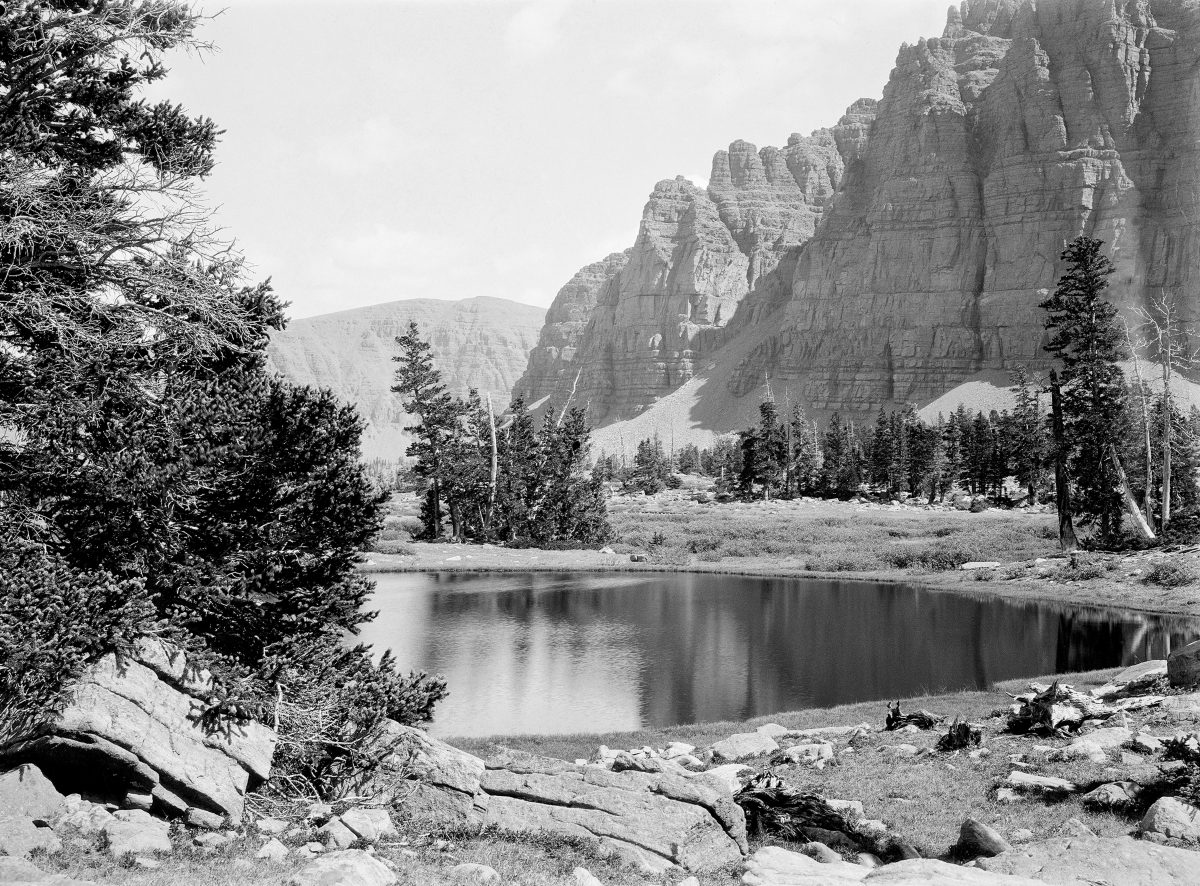
Lake archival pigment print by Beard from the 1920s

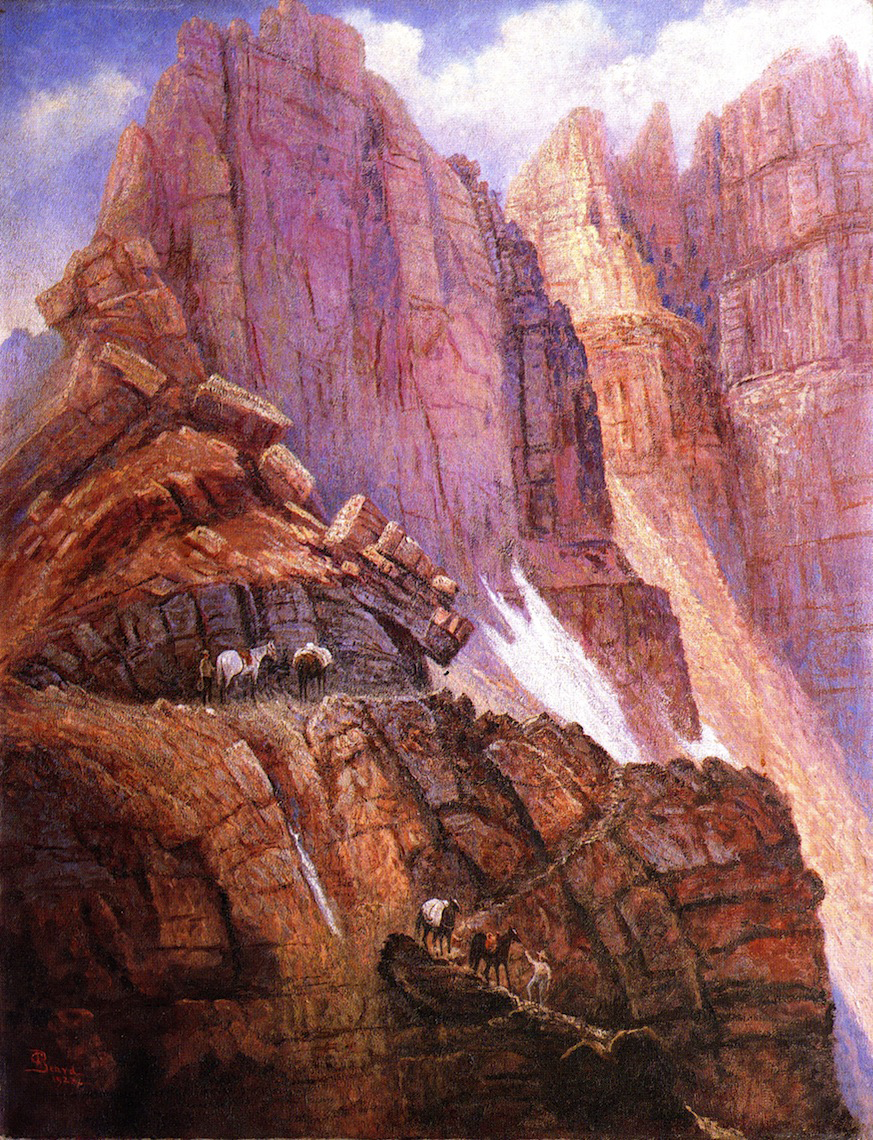
"Dead Horse Point" painting by Beard

Beard's artistic endeavors began in his childhood, under the eye of his mother who was also loved art. His first paintings, created before his family immigrated, were watercolor paintings. While traveling to Utah in 1868, Beard and his siblings made a stop at Niagara Falls, which was incredibly influential later on in his artwork. He later wrote that, "If I have the soul of an artist, it was born while there". Early influences and inspiration for Beard's work included the work of Utah-based artists Carl Anderson and George M. Ottinger. Thomas Moran also served as an influence for Beard's developing style. Despite this, he was mostly self-taught. His style is described at as Romantic, which is shown through the dramatic proportions meant to show emotion in his landscape paintings of the Uintas Mountains. Ehren Clark, writing at 15 Bytes, described his paintings, along with his photographs, as having "that spirit of divinity of the unforeseeable in nature".

=== Photography ===
Beard informally studied photography under Charles R. Savage, a prominent landscape photographer in Utah at the time. Beard used a Tele-Photo Cycle-Poco camera that he named "Alice" to take pictures. The primary goal of his photographs was to serve as inspiration for his paintings. Beard's daughter, Edna Beard Taylor, described her father as being "untiring in his photography. He would wait for hours for certain light and cloud effects". His work was considered "of excellent artistic value" by Nelson Wadsworth, a photographic historian and professor at BYU. According to Herman du Toit, former Head of Museum Research at BYU's Museum of Art, Beard's photographs demonstrated his skill, being carefully composed to have "a balance of light and shade". His success in photography could be attributed to the dramatic changes in the medium in the late 1800s. The dry-plate negative, along with other photography innovations, made the process faster, easier, and cheaper to mass-produce. Portable darkrooms were also no longer necessary as film did not need to be developed immediately. Beard's embrace of this new glass plate technology allowed him to take pictures of and document Coalville throughout five decades. Despite his success in photography and painting, he did not pursue a career in art and it remained a passionate pastime for him. Beard accumulated upwards of 1,500 glass plate negatives throughout his lifetime.

== Personal life ==
Shortly after arriving in Utah as a young man, Beard met Lovenia Bollock, the daughter of a clerk for Brigham Young. They were married in 1877 and had eight children, four girls and four boys. The majority of his photographs that did not feature nature scenes featured his children and grandchildren. Beard lost two of his sons in his lifetime, one to the influenza epidemic and another after an appendectomy. Lovenia died 12 years before George, which prompted him to spend his last years traveling and painting around Utah. He developed cataracts, which halted his ability to paint and photograph, but surgery allowed him to see again after months of blindness.

== Death and legacy ==
George Beard died October 3, 1944, at the age of 89. One year before his death, Ralph B. Jordan wrote that "George Beard, of Coalville, is a man the world should know" when describing his life and career as an artist. Beard named Mount Lovenia, a peak that sits in the Uinta Mountains, after his wife, Lovenia. Lake George Beard in Duchesne County is named after him. Following his death, glass plate negatives of his photographs were donated to the L. Tom Perry Special Collections at Brigham Young University to be displayed. By using scans of these negatives as well as donations, BYU was able to curate an exhibit of 32 photographs and a few paintings to honor Beard in 1975. From March to June 2017, Beard's great-great nephew Norm Thurston commissioned an exhibit curated by Herman du Toit at the Springville Art Museum. It showed 32 prints created from scans of the glass plate negatives housed at BYU and some of his landscape paintings.
