= Kweeyahgut Peak =

Mountain in Utah, United States

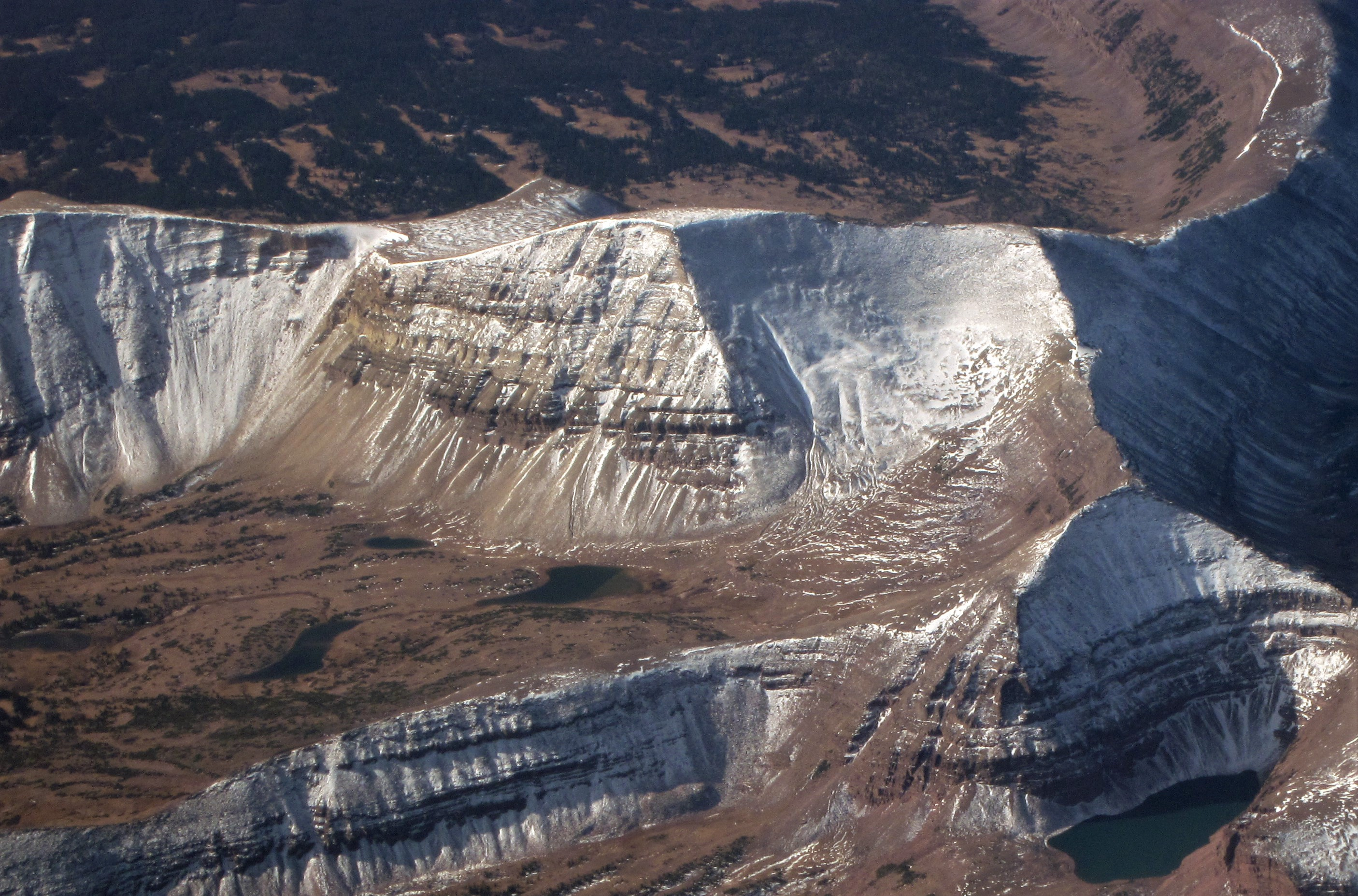
- Northeast aspect, from jetliner

Highest point
- Elevation: 12,855 ft (3,918 m)
- Prominence: 995 ft (303 m)
- Parent peak: Mount Lovenia (13,219 ft)
- Isolation: 4.33 mi (6.97 km)
- Coordinates: 40°42′01″N 110°38′36″W

Geography
- Location within Utah Location within the United States
- Country: United States of America
- State: Utah
- County: Duchesne
- Protected area: High Uintas Wilderness
- Parent range: Uinta Mountains; Rocky Mountains
- Topo map: USGS Explorer Peak

Geology
- Rock age: Neoproterozoic
- Rock type: Metasedimentary rock

Climbing
- Easiest route: class 2

Kweeyahgut Peak is a 12,855-foot-elevation (3,918-meter) mountain summit in Duchesne County, Utah, United States.

== Description ==
Kweeyahgut Peak is set within the High Uintas Wilderness on land managed by Ashley National Forest. It is located in the Uinta Mountains which are a subset of the Rocky Mountains, and it ranks as the 21st-highest summit in Utah. Topographic relief is significant as the summit rises over 1,700 feet (520 meters) above Ottoson Basin in less than one-half mile. Neighbors include Explorer Peak 1.24 mile to the north, Mount Lovenia 4.32 miles to the north-northeast, and Dead Horse Peak is 3.94 miles to the northwest. Precipitation runoff from this mountain drains into tributaries of the Duchesne River.

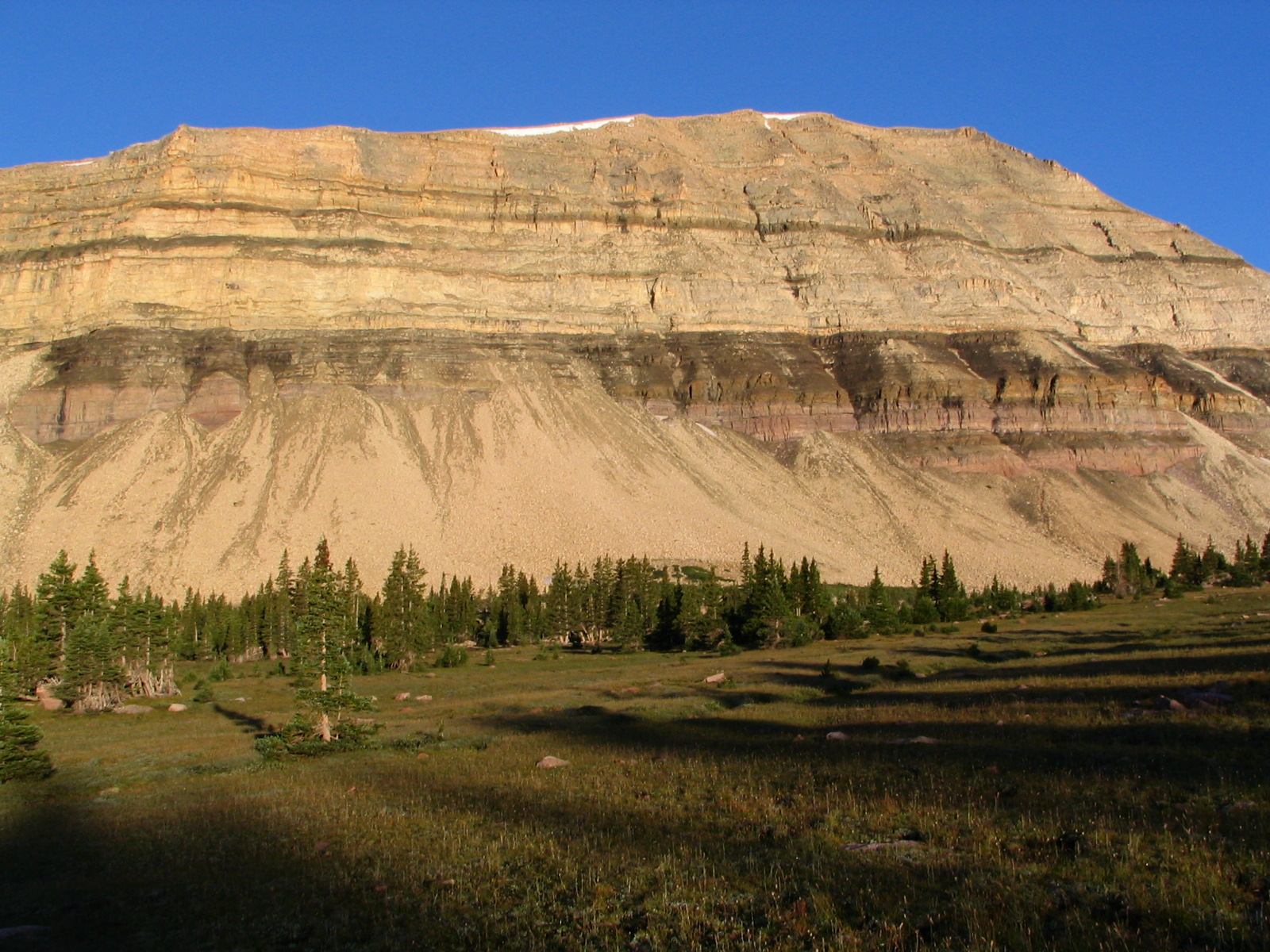
East face, from Ottoson Basin

== Etymology ==
The landform's toponym was officially adopted on September 8, 2022, by the U.S. Board on Geographic Names to replace the previous derogatory "Squaw Peak" name. In the Ute language, "kwiyagat" (kweeyahgut) means "bear," which is a sacred animal to the Ute.

== Climate ==
Based on the Köppen climate classification, Kweeyahgut Peak is located in a subarctic climate zone with cold snowy winters and mild summers.

== See also ==
- Geology of the Uinta Mountains
- Explorer Peak
