= Explorer Peak =

Mountain in Utah, United States

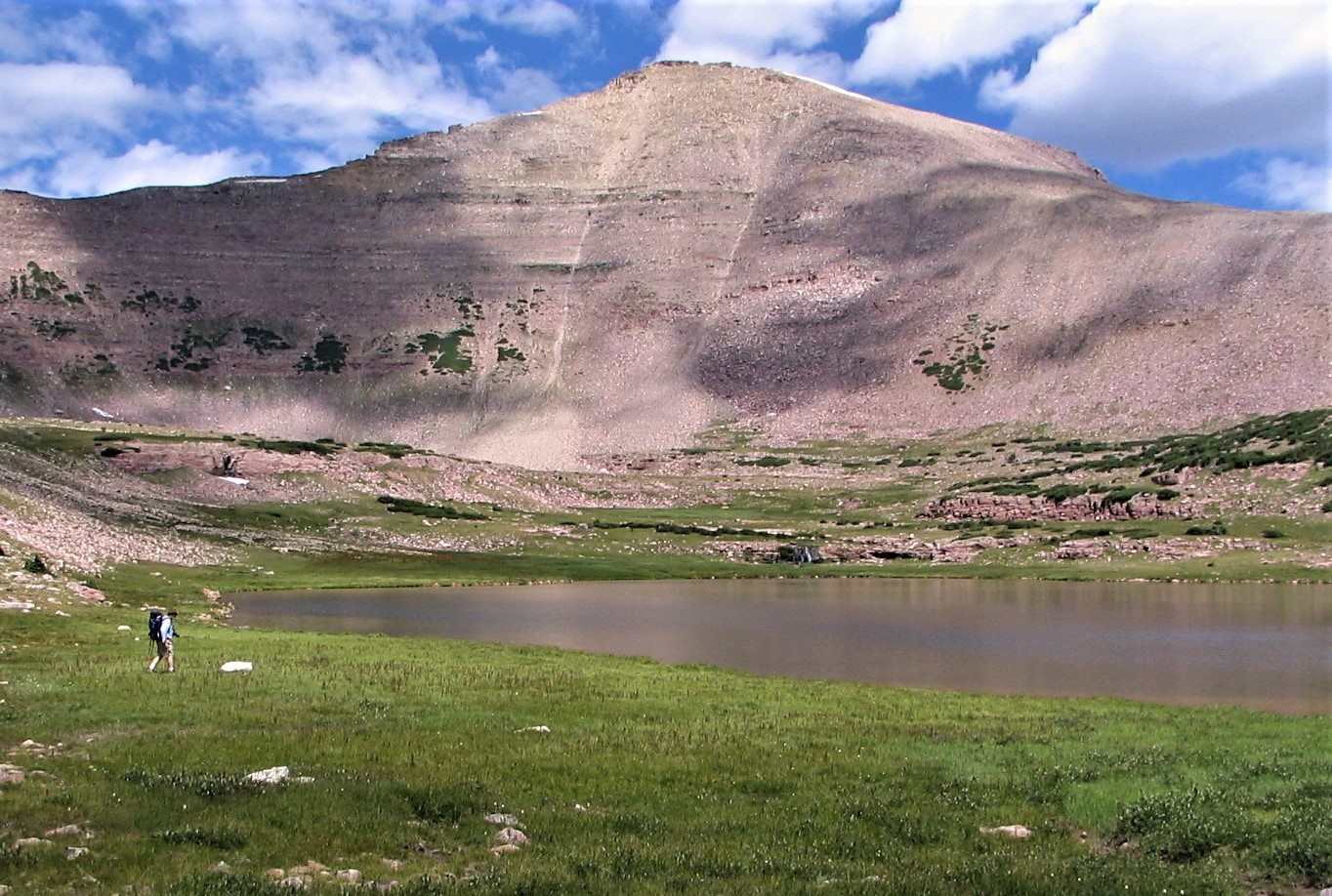
- Southeast aspect, from Ottoson Basin

Highest point
- Elevation: 12,708 ft (3,873 m)
- Prominence: 668 ft (204 m)
- Parent peak: Kweeyahgut Peak (12,855 ft)
- Isolation: 1.25 mi (2.01 km)
- Coordinates: 40°43′05″N 110°38′39″W

Geography
- Location within Utah Location within the United States
- Location: High Uintas Wilderness
- Country: United States of America
- State: Utah
- County: Duchesne
- Parent range: Uinta Mountains; Rocky Mountains
- Topo map: USGS Explorer Peak

Geology
- Rock age: Neoproterozoic
- Rock type: Metasedimentary rock

Climbing
- Easiest route: class 2 scrambling

Explorer Peak is a 12,708-foot elevation (3,873 m) mountain summit located in Duchesne County, Utah, United States.

== Description ==
Explorer Peak is set within the High Uintas Wilderness on land managed by Ashley National Forest. It is situated in the Uinta Mountains which are a subset of the Rocky Mountains, and it ranks as the 38th-highest summit in Utah. Topographic relief is significant as the west aspect rises 1,700 feet (520 meters) in less than one-half mile and the north aspect rises 1,440 feet (440 meters) above Crater Lake in one-third mile. Neighbors include Dead Horse Peak three miles to the northwest and Mount Lovenia three miles northeast. Precipitation runoff from this mountain drains west to Fall Creek and east into tributaries of the Lake Fork River. The landform's toponym was officially adopted in 1957 by the U.S. Board on Geographic Names to honor the Explorer Scouts.

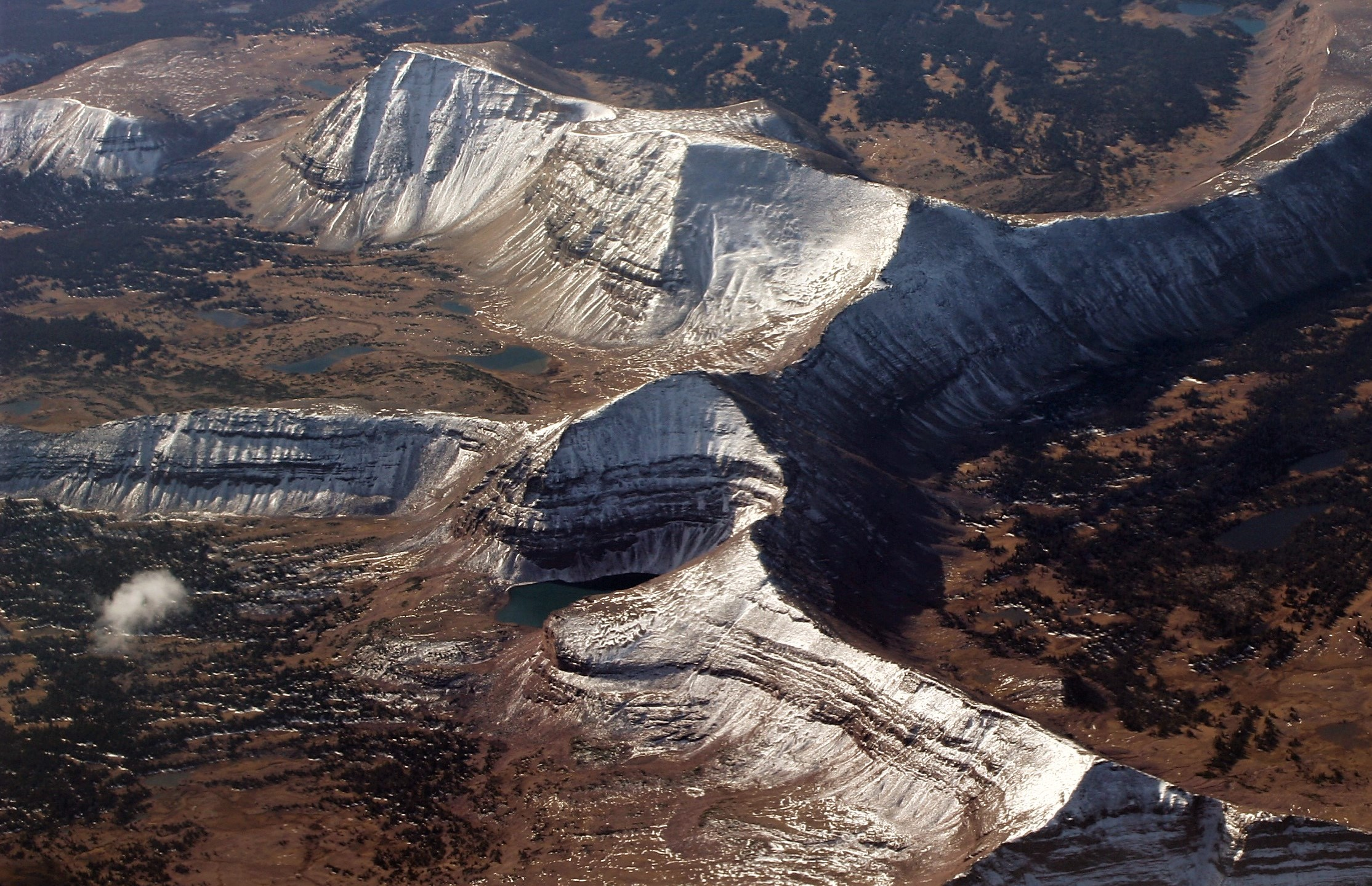
North aspect of Explorer Peak (centered) viewed from airliner. Kweeyahgut Peak above it.

== Climate ==
Based on the Köppen climate classification, Explorer Peak is located in a subarctic climate zone with cold snowy winters and mild summers. Tundra climate characterizes the summit and highest slopes.

== See also ==
- Geology of the Uinta Mountains
- List of mountains in Utah
