= George Beard =

George Beard may refer to:

- George Miller Beard (1839–1883), American neurologist
- George Beard (artist) (1855–1944), American landscape photographer
- a pen name of Dav Pilkey (born 1966), American cartoonist and author
- George Beard (fictional character)
