= Yellowstone River (Utah) =

Coordinates: 40°26′34″N 110°21′55″W

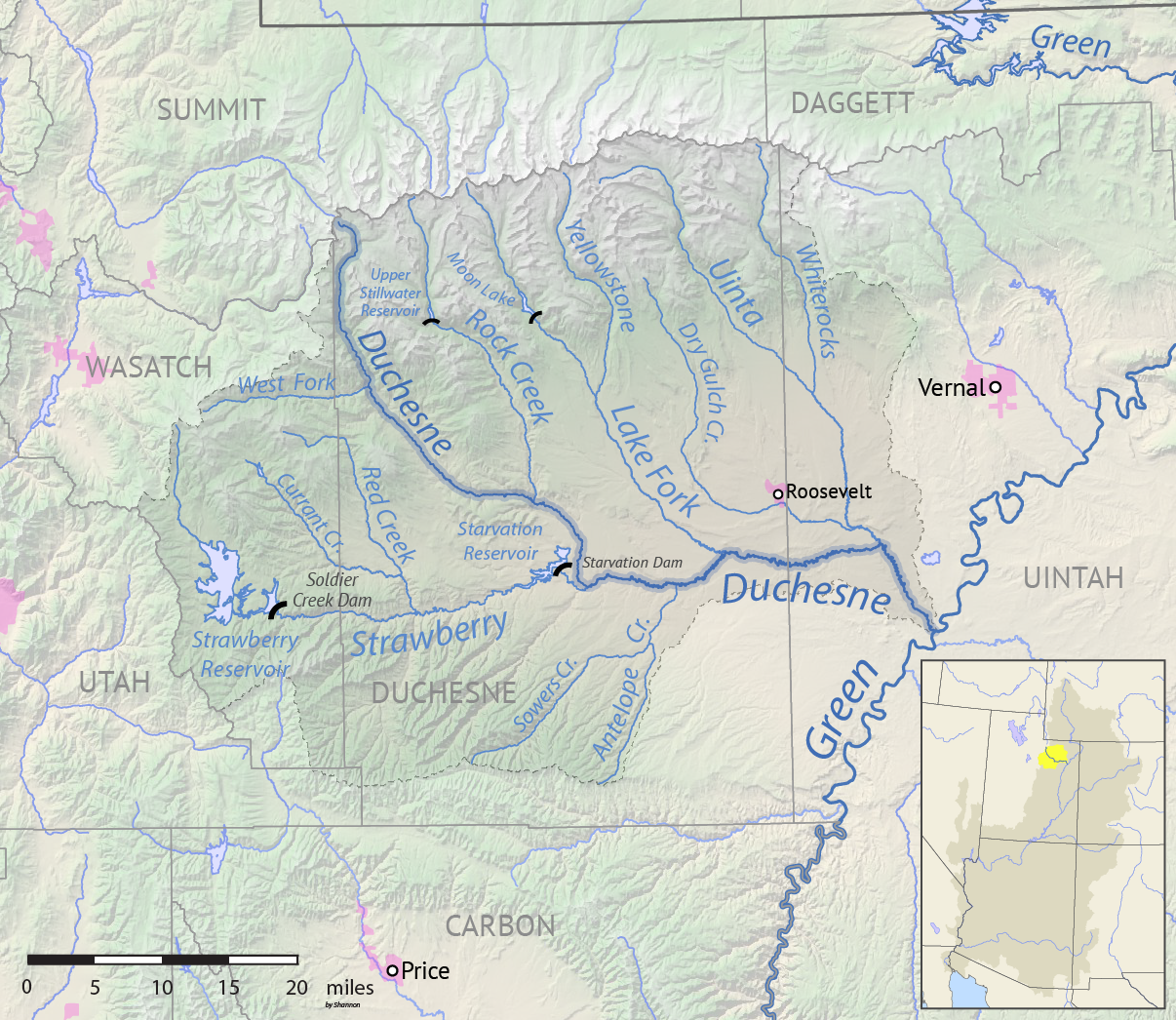
Map of the Duchesne drainage basin, showing the Yellowstone joining the Lake Fork near center.

The Yellowstone River is a river in Duchesne County, Utah in the United States. It flows south from the crest of the Uinta Mountains for 29 miles (47 km) to join the Lake Fork River about 5 miles (8.0 km) north of Mountain Home.

== See also ==
- List of rivers of Utah
- List of tributaries of the Colorado River
