= Ottinger Hall =

Historic building Salt Lake City, Utah, United States

- U.S. National Register of Historic Places
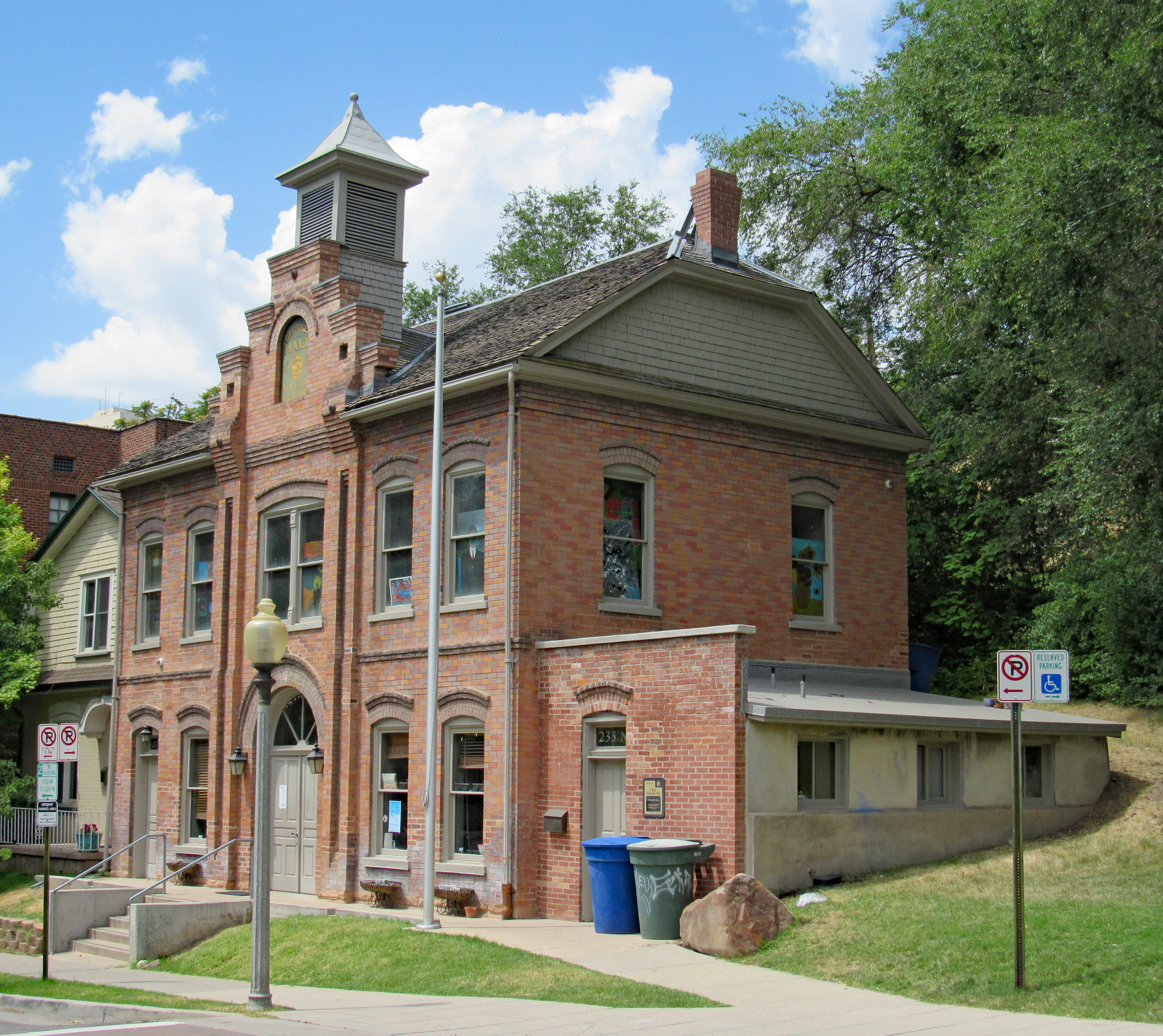
- Ottinger Hall, 2018

- Location within Utah
- Location: 233 Canyon Road; Salt Lake City, Utah, United States
- Coordinates: 40°46′29.49″N 111°53′9.7″W
- Built: 1900–1901
- NRHP reference No.: 71000851
- Added to NRHP: April 16, 1971

Ottinger Hall (originally known as the Veteran Volunteer Firemen's Association Hall) is a historic building in Salt Lake City, Utah. Built as a social hall for the Veteran Volunteer Firemen's Association, it was first put into use in February 1901. For many years, the building hosted a firefighting museum and was listed on the National Register of Historic Places in 1971. The structure was restored in 2006 and has since been home to Salt Lake City's YouthCity program.

== History ==
In fall 1900, Salt Lake City leased property in City Creek Canyon to the Veteran Volunteer Firemen's Association so that they could erect a suitable building to replace their aging hall. By that November, construction on the building had been completed up to the first square. The organization held their first meeting in the nearly-completed building on February 4, 1901.

The organization planned to official move into the hall with a celebration on February 22 (Washington's Birthday), however the dedication was indefinitely postponed just a few days before the event due to the building still being unfinished.

The association moved into the new $2,000 (equivalent to $77,400 in 2025) building just before March 1901, including their collection of relics and firefighting equipment, which was placed together as an exhibit. An open house for guests to tour the building and see the historic firefighting exhibit was held for three days in early April 1901.

In 1924, the association gave Salt Lake City the hall, which it leased back for $1.00 a year. At this time, Mayor Charles Clarence Neslen suggested the hall be named for George M. Ottinger, longtime chief of the volunteer fire department.

The building underwent restoration in 1979, at which time it was being used as a museum to display the firefighting artifacts, along with paintings by Ottinger. Following another restoration of the building, this one completed in 2006, the building became home to an afterschool program known as YouthCity.

== Bell ==
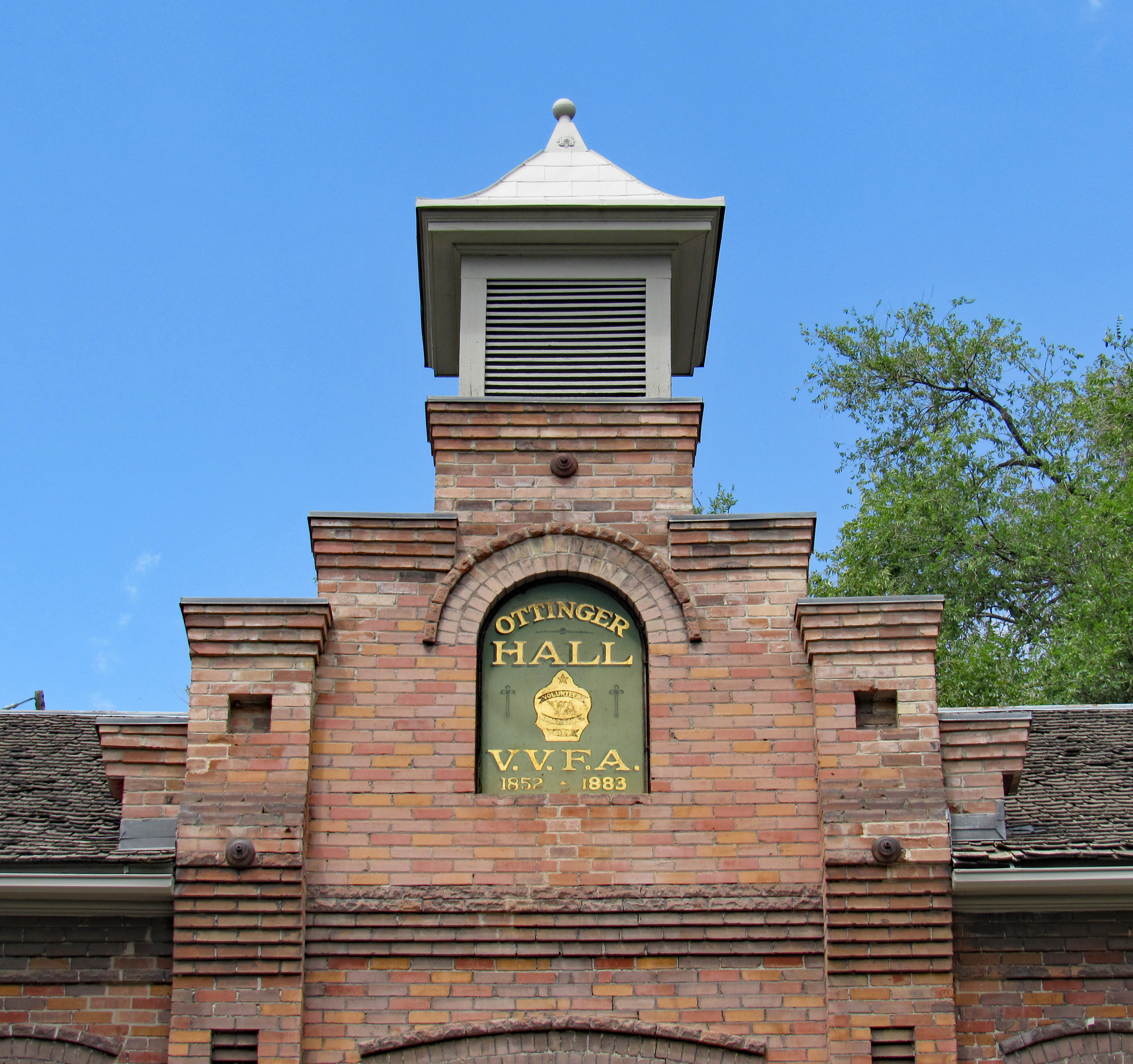
The building's restored bell tower

When the structure opened, a bell was placed in the building's bell tower. The bell had once been hung atop the Wasatch Hose house No. 2. There it was rung when a different bell, this one in the old city hall, tolled and thus communicated to those further away from the city hall that there was a fire in town. The number of rings indicated the direction of the fire, whether north, south, east or west.

== Replica ==
In August 2000, This Is the Place Heritage Park opened a replica of Ottinger Hall. Financed by Utah businessman Larry H. Miller (a descendant of volunteer fire chief, Jesse C. Little), it became home to the historic firefighting artifacts which were moved from the original building to the replica. The collection has since been removed and the replica building is used as event space.

== See also ==
- National Register of Historic Places listings in Salt Lake City
