= Mount Lovenia =

Mountain in the American state of Utah

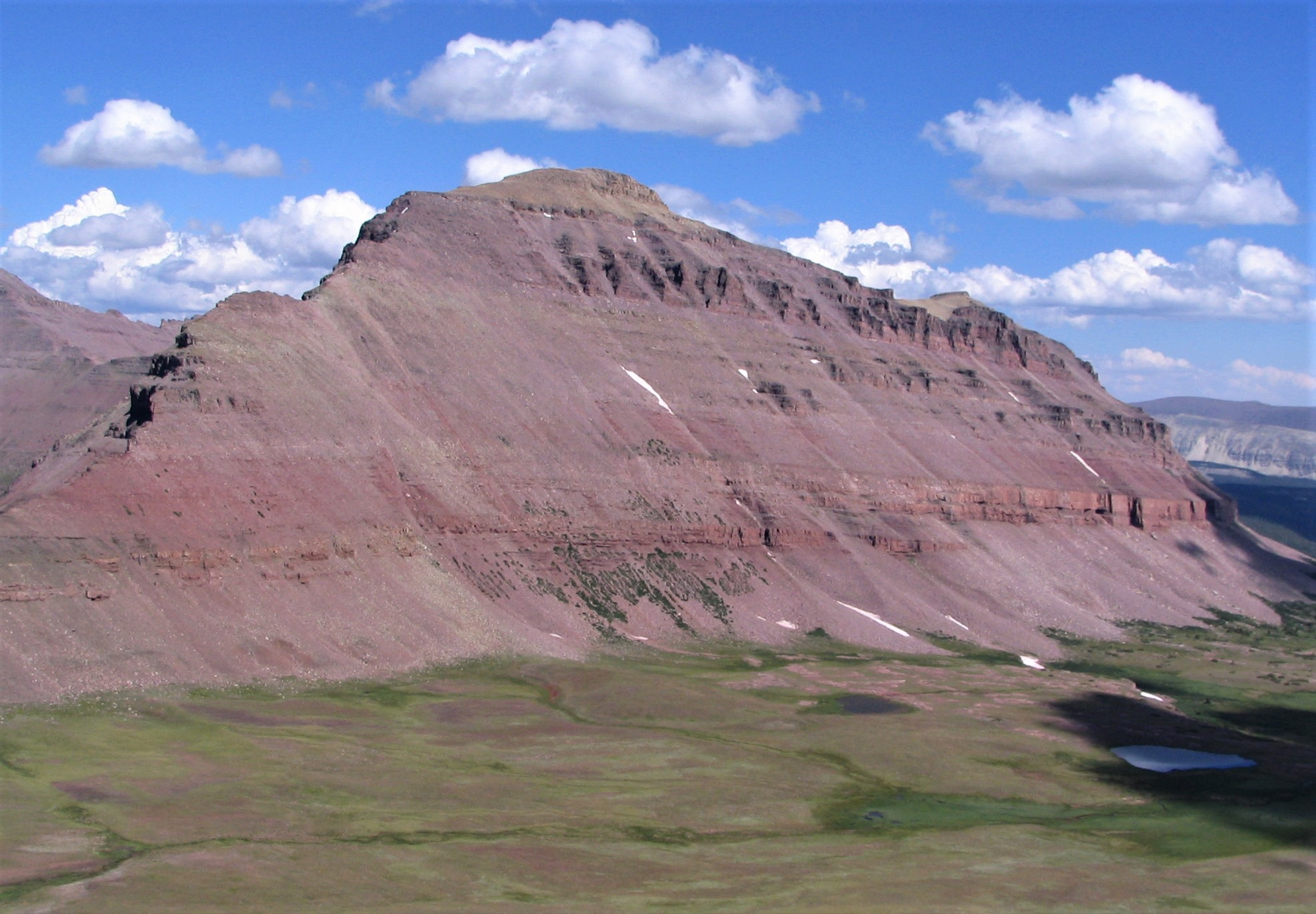
- West aspect

Highest point
- Elevation: 13,219 ft (4,029 m)
- Prominence: 1,459 ft (445 m)
- Parent peak: Henrys Fork Peak (13,260 ft)
- Isolation: 11.59 mi (18.65 km)
- Coordinates: 40°45′24″N 110°36′26″W

Geography
- Location within Utah Location within the United States
- Location: High Uintas Wilderness
- Country: United States of America
- State: Utah
- County: Duchesne / Summit
- Parent range: Uinta Mountains; Rocky Mountains
- Topo map: USGS Mount Lovenia

Geology
- Rock age: Neoproterozoic
- Rock type: Metasedimentary rock

Climbing
- Easiest route: class 2 scrambling

Mount Lovenia is a 13,219-foot elevation (4,029 m) mountain summit located on the common border that Duchesne County shares with Summit County in the U.S. state of Utah.

== Description ==
Mount Lovenia is set within the High Uintas Wilderness on land managed by Ashley National Forest. It is situated along the crest of the Uinta Mountains which are a subset of the Rocky Mountains, and it ranks as the 10th-highest summit in Utah, and 51st-highest in the United States if a 400-foot clean prominence cutoff is considered as criteria. Topographic relief is significant as the west face rises 2,000 feet (610 meters) in less than one-half mile and the north face rises 1,800 feet (550 meters) in one-half mile. Neighbors include Wasatch Peak two miles to the north-northwest, and Dead Horse Peak is five miles to the west-southwest. Precipitation runoff from this mountain drains north to the Blacks Fork and south into headwaters of the Lake Fork River.

== Etymology ==
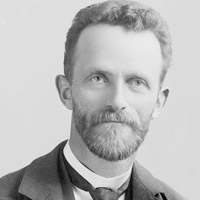
George Beard

The landform's toponym has been officially adopted by the U.S. Board on Geographic Names. Nature-lover and artist George Beard (1854–1944) of Coalville, Utah, named this mountain for his wife, Sarah Lovenia Bullock Beard (1859–1932), who was the daughter of Mormon pioneer Thomas Bullock.

== Climate ==
Based on the Köppen climate classification, Mount Lovenia is located in a subarctic climate zone with cold snowy winters and mild summers. Tundra climate characterizes the summit and highest slopes. There is no weather station at the summit, but this climate table contains interpolated data for an area around the summit.

Climate data for Mount Lovenia 40.7574 N, 110.6107 W, Elevation: 12,562 ft (3,829 m) (1991–2020 normals)
Month	Jan	Feb	Mar	Apr	May	Jun	Jul	Aug	Sep	Oct	Nov	Dec	Year
Mean daily maximum °F (°C)	22.8 (−5.1)	22.8 (−5.1)	29.0 (−1.7)	33.8 (1.0)	42.0 (5.6)	52.4 (11.3)	60.1 (15.6)	58.5 (14.7)	50.8 (10.4)	39.8 (4.3)	28.9 (−1.7)	22.2 (−5.4)	38.6 (3.7)
Daily mean °F (°C)	11.8 (−11.2)	11.0 (−11.7)	16.1 (−8.8)	20.7 (−6.3)	29.2 (−1.6)	39.1 (3.9)	46.6 (8.1)	45.2 (7.3)	38.0 (3.3)	27.9 (−2.3)	18.1 (−7.7)	11.6 (−11.3)	26.3 (−3.2)
Mean daily minimum °F (°C)	0.9 (−17.3)	−0.9 (−18.3)	3.1 (−16.1)	7.6 (−13.6)	16.3 (−8.7)	25.9 (−3.4)	33.2 (0.7)	32.0 (0.0)	25.2 (−3.8)	16.1 (−8.8)	7.2 (−13.8)	1.0 (−17.2)	14.0 (−10.0)
Average precipitation inches (mm)	4.37 (111)	3.91 (99)	3.51 (89)	3.78 (96)	3.37 (86)	2.16 (55)	2.40 (61)	3.13 (80)	3.25 (83)	3.10 (79)	3.71 (94)	4.09 (104)	40.78 (1,037)
Source: PRISM Climate Group

== See also ==
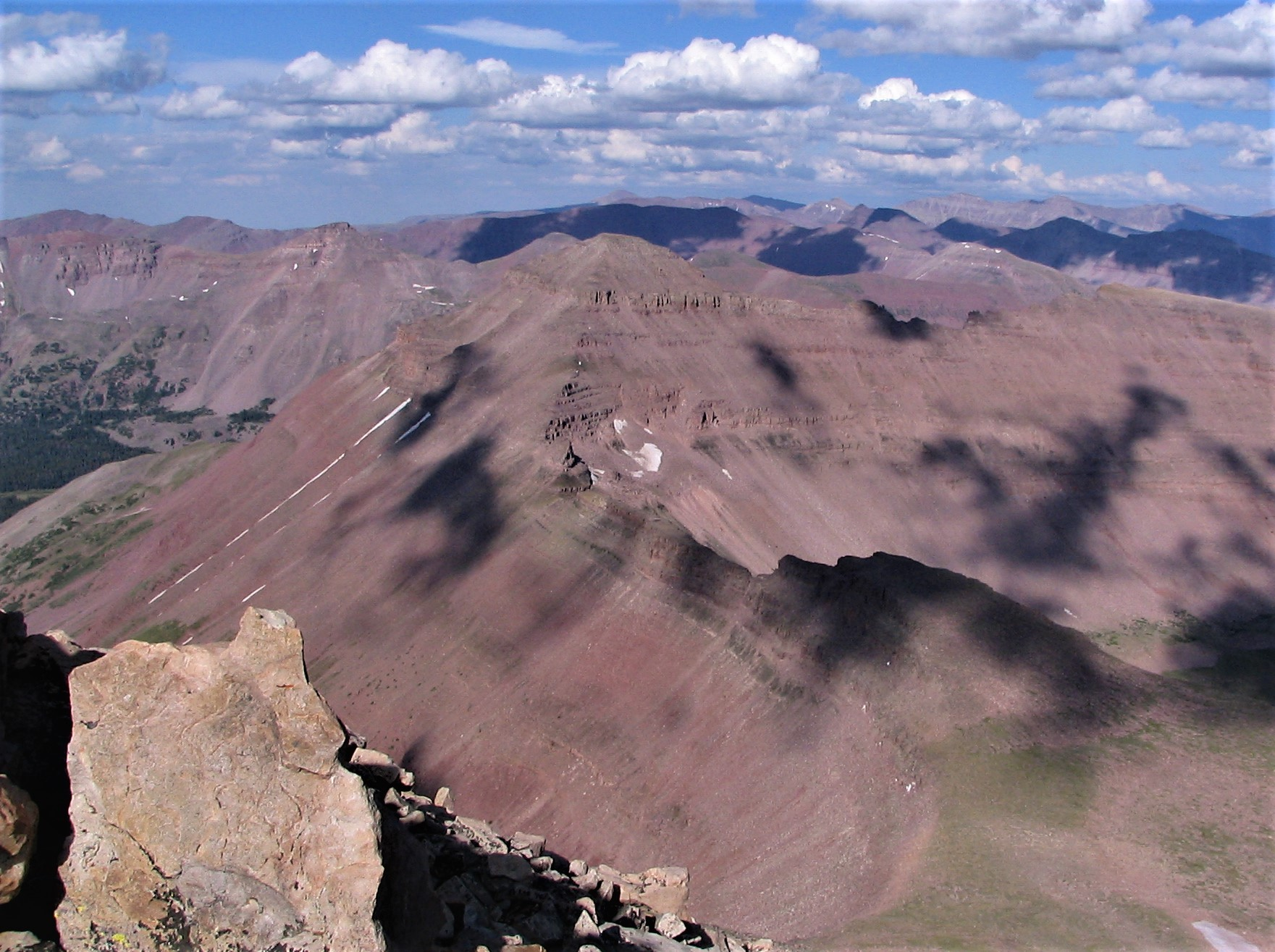
Looking east from Mt. Lovenia at Peak 13032, also known as "East Lovenia" or "Quandary Peak"

- Geology of the Uinta Mountains
- Thirteener
- List of mountains in Utah
- Explorer Peak
