= Lake Fork River =

Coordinates: 40°12′32″N 110°06′14″W

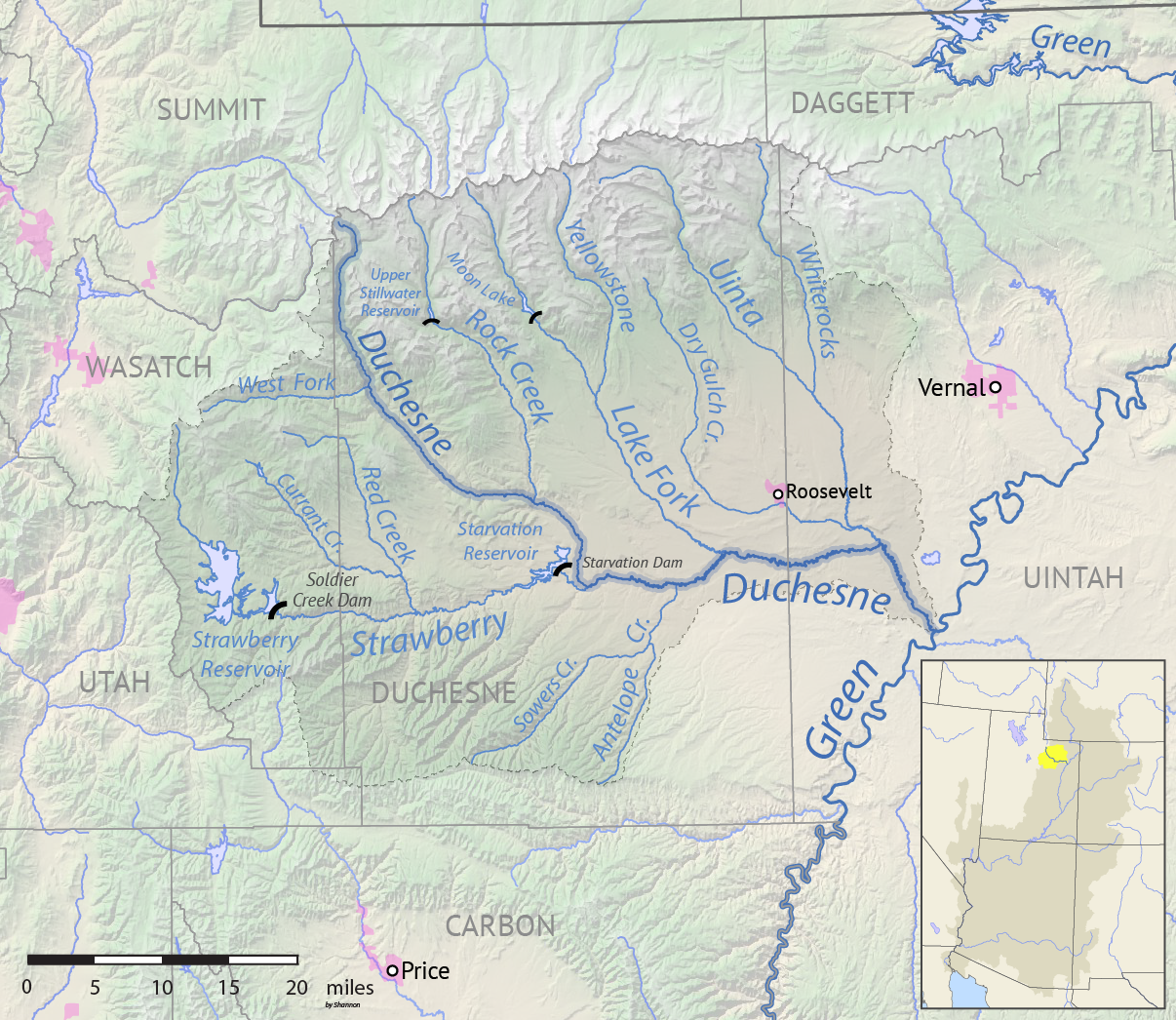
Map of the Duchesne drainage basin. Lake Fork joins the Duchesne southwest of Roosevelt.

The Lake Fork River is a river in Duchesne County, Utah in the United States. It flows for 54 miles (87 km) from Mount Lovenia in the Uinta Mountains, in a southeasterly direction, receiving the Yellowstone River above Mountain Home, to join the Duchesne River near Myton. The river is dammed near its headwaters to form Moon Lake, formerly a smaller natural lake.

== Climate ==
Lakefork Basin is a SNOTEL weather station located near the source of the Lakefork River by Mount Lovenia.

Climate data for Lakefork Basin, Utah, 1991–2020 normals, 1982-2020 extremes: 10966ft (3342m)
Month	Jan	Feb	Mar	Apr	May	Jun	Jul	Aug	Sep	Oct	Nov	Dec	Year
Record high °F (°C)	56 (13)	62 (17)	65 (18)	66 (19)	74 (23)	77 (25)	83 (28)	76 (24)	74 (23)	70 (21)	61 (16)	50 (10)	83 (28)
Mean maximum °F (°C)	45.7 (7.6)	46.3 (7.9)	53.3 (11.8)	58.0 (14.4)	63.8 (17.7)	70.5 (21.4)	74.5 (23.6)	71.8 (22.1)	67.0 (19.4)	60.8 (16.0)	52.0 (11.1)	43.5 (6.4)	74.6 (23.7)
Mean daily maximum °F (°C)	28.9 (−1.7)	31.1 (−0.5)	38.2 (3.4)	42.9 (6.1)	50.9 (10.5)	58.8 (14.9)	66.3 (19.1)	64.4 (18.0)	56.4 (13.6)	45.9 (7.7)	34.5 (1.4)	27.8 (−2.3)	45.5 (7.5)
Daily mean °F (°C)	18.3 (−7.6)	18.6 (−7.4)	24.4 (−4.2)	29.3 (−1.5)	37.8 (3.2)	46.4 (8.0)	53.7 (12.1)	51.9 (11.1)	44.9 (7.2)	35.1 (1.7)	23.7 (−4.6)	17.6 (−8.0)	33.5 (0.8)
Mean daily minimum °F (°C)	7.7 (−13.5)	6.1 (−14.4)	10.7 (−11.8)	15.5 (−9.2)	24.8 (−4.0)	34.0 (1.1)	41.1 (5.1)	39.5 (4.2)	33.2 (0.7)	24.2 (−4.3)	12.9 (−10.6)	7.4 (−13.7)	21.4 (−5.9)
Mean minimum °F (°C)	−10.8 (−23.8)	−11.1 (−23.9)	−6.5 (−21.4)	0.2 (−17.7)	9.0 (−12.8)	22.5 (−5.3)	34.5 (1.4)	32.2 (0.1)	21.0 (−6.1)	6.8 (−14.0)	−7.1 (−21.7)	−11.4 (−24.1)	−16.4 (−26.9)
Record low °F (°C)	−30 (−34)	−29 (−34)	−16 (−27)	−16 (−27)	−6 (−21)	12 (−11)	26 (−3)	25 (−4)	4 (−16)	−6 (−21)	−15 (−26)	−25 (−32)	−30 (−34)
Average precipitation inches (mm)	3.77 (96)	3.50 (89)	3.26 (83)	3.63 (92)	3.20 (81)	2.03 (52)	2.26 (57)	2.57 (65)	2.81 (71)	2.98 (76)	3.22 (82)	3.68 (93)	36.91 (937)
Source 1: XMACIS2
Source 2: NOAA (Precipitation)

== See also ==
- List of rivers of Utah
- List of tributaries of the Colorado River
