= George M. Ottinger =

American painter (1833–1917)

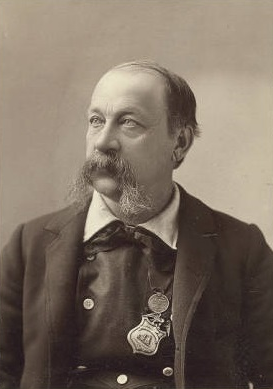
- Portrait of Ottinger by Charles Roscoe Savage, c. 1883
- Born: George Martin Ottinger; February 8, 1833; Springfield Township, Montgomery County, Pennsylvania, US
- Died: October 28, 1917 (aged 84); Salt Lake City, Utah, US
- Occupations: Public official; artist; educator; actor; photographer

George Martin Ottinger (February 8, 1833 – October 28, 1917) was an American public official, artist, educator, actor and photographer, who spent most of his career in Utah.

== Biography ==
He was born in Springfield Township, Montgomery County, Pennsylvania, and then raised in New York City. He was raised as a Quaker. In 1850, at age 17, he joined the crew of a whaling ship. By age 20, he had circumnavigated the globe and done gold digging in California. He then studied art under Robert Weir for a time, before going to the Pennsylvania Academy of Fine Arts. For the next two years, he worked as a painter of miniatures in Lancaster, Pennsylvania. He then moved to Kentucky where he worked as a photograph tinter as well as a fruit merchant.

In 1857, he returned to Pennsylvania to continue to study art. The following year, he joined the Church of Jesus Christ of Latter-day Saints (LDS Church) at the urging of his mother. In 1859, he went to Richmond, Virginia, where he worked as an artist.

He came to Utah Territory as part of the Milo Andrus Pioneer Company in 1861 and formed a partnership with the photographer Charles Roscoe Savage. There was so little demand for their work in Salt Lake City that for part of 1861 they traveled through Idaho Territory, doing jobs related to photography. He also did scenery painting for the Salt Lake Theatre as well as acting. In 1863, he became principal of the Deseret Academy of Arts, which was another joint venture with Savage.

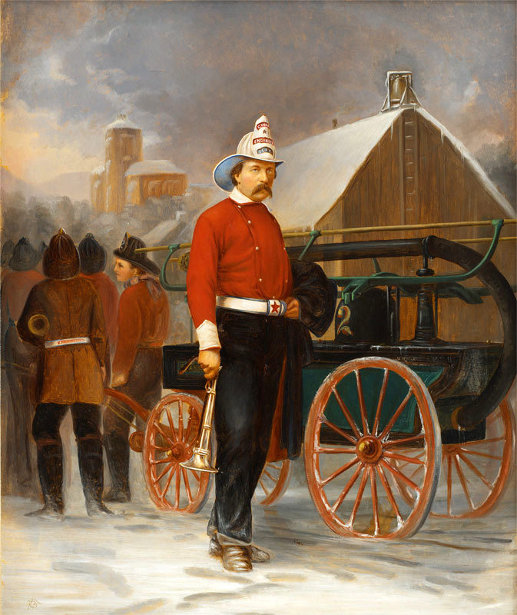
Self-portrait as the Fire Chief

Also in 1861, he married Mary Jane McAllister Cullin. They had only one child before she died. In 1864, he married Phoebe Neslen.

Three years later, he began painting a series on the Spanish conquest of the Americas, beginning with "The Last of the Aztecs". In 1879, he went to Europe with Savage as an art missionary, to improve his artistic skills. On his return, he did murals in the St. George, Logan and Manti Temples.

From 1876 to 1890, he was head of the Salt Lake Fire Department, overseeing its transformation from a volunteer to a paid organization in 1883. He also taught art at the University of Deseret, beginning in 1881 and continuing until 1892. He was a key influence on many later Utah artists.

For many years he was part of the Nauvoo Legion. In 1894, he was appointed Adjutant General of Utah, and in this position oversaw the organization of the Utah National Guard. He died in Salt Lake City, Utah, on October 28, 1917, of a coronary thrombosis.

== See also ==
- Ottinger Hall
