= Charles Roscoe Savage =

American photographer (1832–1909)

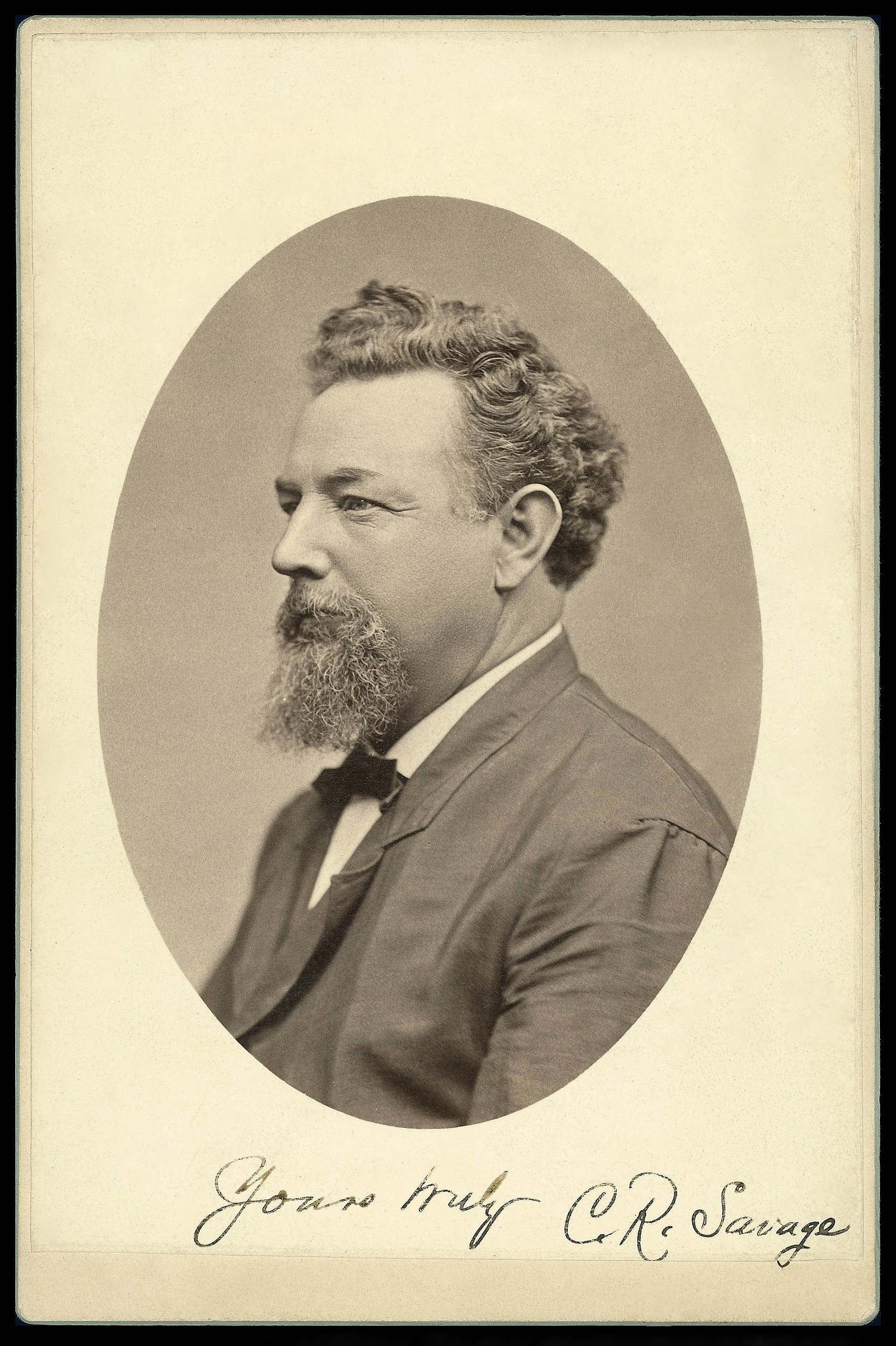
- Savage, signed self-portrait, ca. 1880–90
- Born: August 16, 1832; Southampton, Hampshire, England
- Died: February 4, 1909 (aged 76); Salt Lake City, Utah, U.S.
- Occupation: Photographer
- Known for: American West; First transcontinental railroad
- Notable work: Views of the Great West

Charles Roscoe Savage (August 16, 1832 – February 4, 1909) was a British-born landscape and portrait photographer most notable for his images of the American West. Savage converted to the Church of Jesus Christ of Latter-day Saints in his youth while living in England. He served a mission in Switzerland and eventually moved to the United States. In America he became interested in photography and began taking portraits for hire in the East. He traveled to Salt Lake City with his family and opened up his Art Bazar where he sold many of his photographs. Savage concentrated his photographic efforts primarily on family portraits, landscapes, and documentary views. His work includes an 1869 series of photographs of the linking of the first transcontinental railroad at Promontory, Utah.

== Early life ==
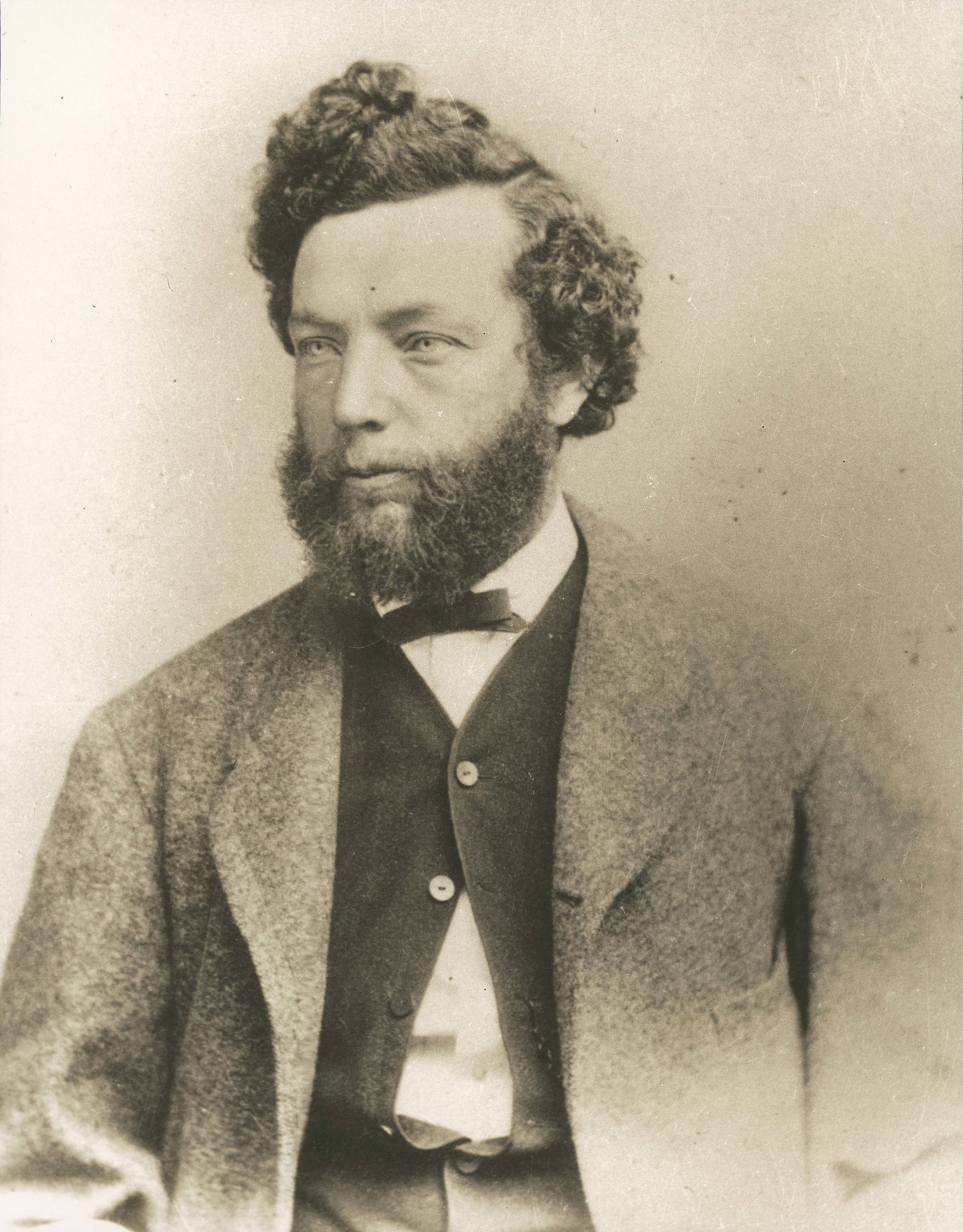
Middle-aged Savage bust portrait, c. 1860s

Savage was born in Southampton, England, on August 16, 1832, to John and Ann, the first of four children. At the age of four, his clothing caught on fire from a stray burning woodchip, and he suffered bad burns. Rather than attend school, he peddled salt in Southampton and helped a coachmaker sharpen tools. On May 25, 1848, at age 15, he was baptized into the Church of Jesus Christ of Latter-day Saints (LDS Church), to his parents' disapproval. Savage moved to the Isle of Wight to work as a fishmonger and helped the Mormons there to proselyte. He returned to Southampton and worked for William Eddington in a stationery shop from 1851 to 1852. Eddington also educated him; Savage later writing that Eddington "placed me as it were on the road to fame".

Savage worked part-time as a secretary for the Southampton mission president, collecting and recording donations. In 1853, he was a full-time missionary for the church in Switzerland, where he learned to speak French and a little German. After 19 months he returned to England, where he met Annie Adkins. In December 1855, he was appointed as an interpreter for French-speaking Italian Latter-day Saints who were emigrating to America through the LDS Church's Perpetual Emigration Fund. The two were married on June 24, 1856, ten days after Annie's arrival. Savage worked in Samuel Booth's print shop and took odd jobs. He and his friend Stenhouse experimented with taking stereo graphic photos, which were the first stereo graphic photos of Long Island. It is likely that he received instruction from Edward Covington, a daguerrotypist in New York, among others. He went to Florence, Nebraska on a church assignment in 1859; while there, he started selling portraits. He met up with his family in Council Bluffs, Iowa, where he continued selling photographs.

== Early photography career ==
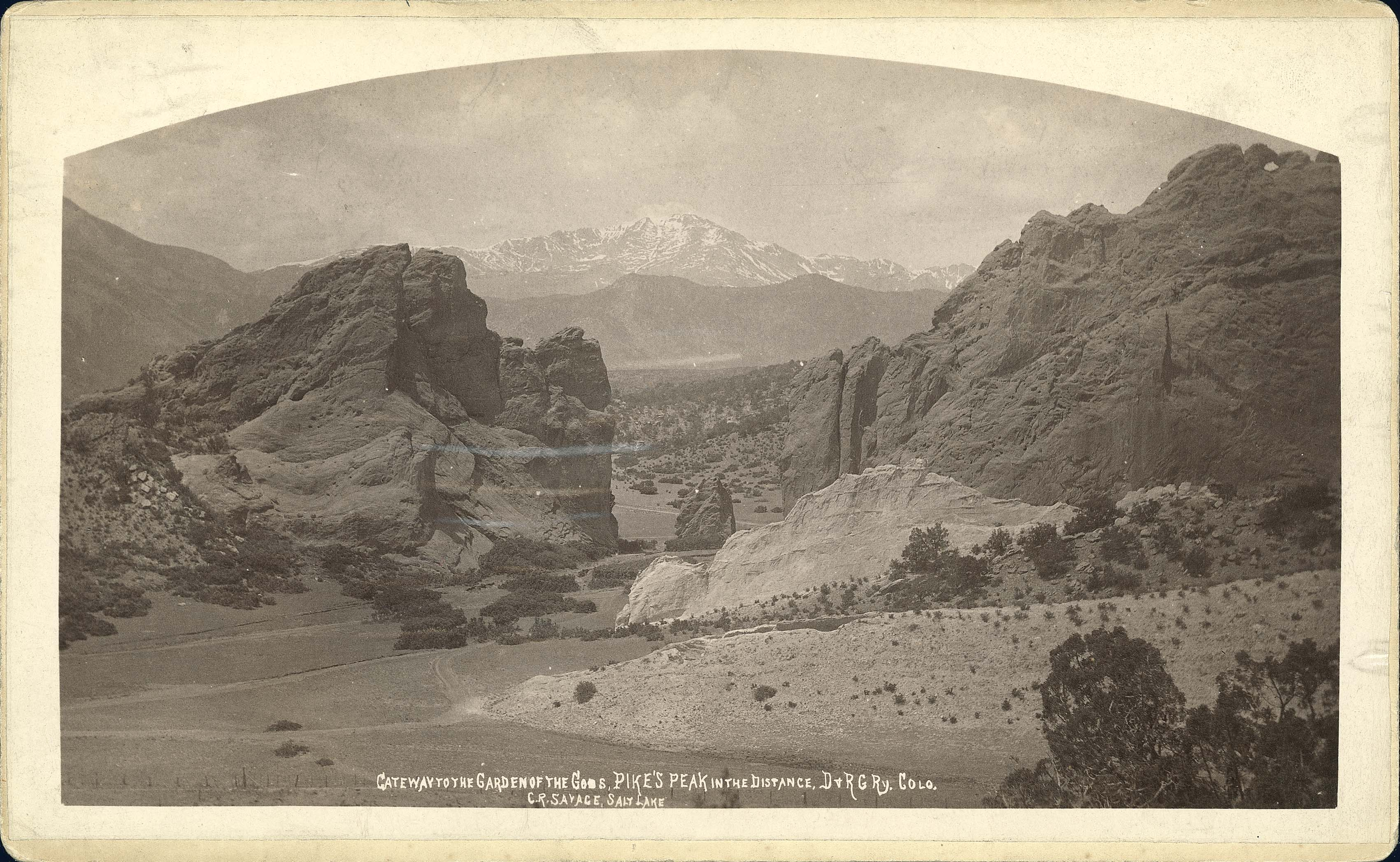
Gateway to the Garden of the Gods, Pike's Peak in the Distance, c. 1874

In the spring of 1860, with the Brown Company Savage traveled to Salt Lake City, Utah Territory with his family. He photographed the Mormon trail while travelling to Utah but no photographs have survived.In 1861 he established a photography studio with a partner, Marsena Cannon, an early Utah daguerreotypist and photographer. A year later, after Cannon moved to southern Utah, he established a partnership with artist George M. Ottinger. Ottinger and Savage helped to organize the Deseret Academy of Art, which was soon replaced by the University of Deseret. Ottinger painted scenery for the Salt Lake Theatre and took photos of local buildings and landscapes. Savage became increasingly popular as a portrait photographer and prominent people in Utah commissioned him to take their photos. He was also an active member of the 20th ward, sang in the Mormon Tabernacle Choir, joined the Nauvoo Legion, and lectured on various subjects at the local Literary Institute. Savage advertised in local newspapers to increase his business. Several times, he made a collage of the baby photographs he had taken over the years, and often families with featured children would buy a copy. To protect his work from copyright infringement, he retained the original glass plate negatives of his photographs, giving him more control over their use.

Charles W. Carter joined Ottinger and Savage's photography studio at some point after November 1864, when Carter arrived in Salt Lake City. Carter started his own photography studio with J.B. Silvis sometime in 1867. Carter often printed and sold other photographers' work. Since it is difficult to determine whether some photographs from this time were taken by Carter or Savage, occasionally both photographers are credited. While Andrew J. Russell was documenting the construction of the Union Pacific Railroad in 1868, he met and befriended Savage. The two photographers often took photographs of the same scenes within minutes of each other.

== Initial railroad work and trip to New York City ==
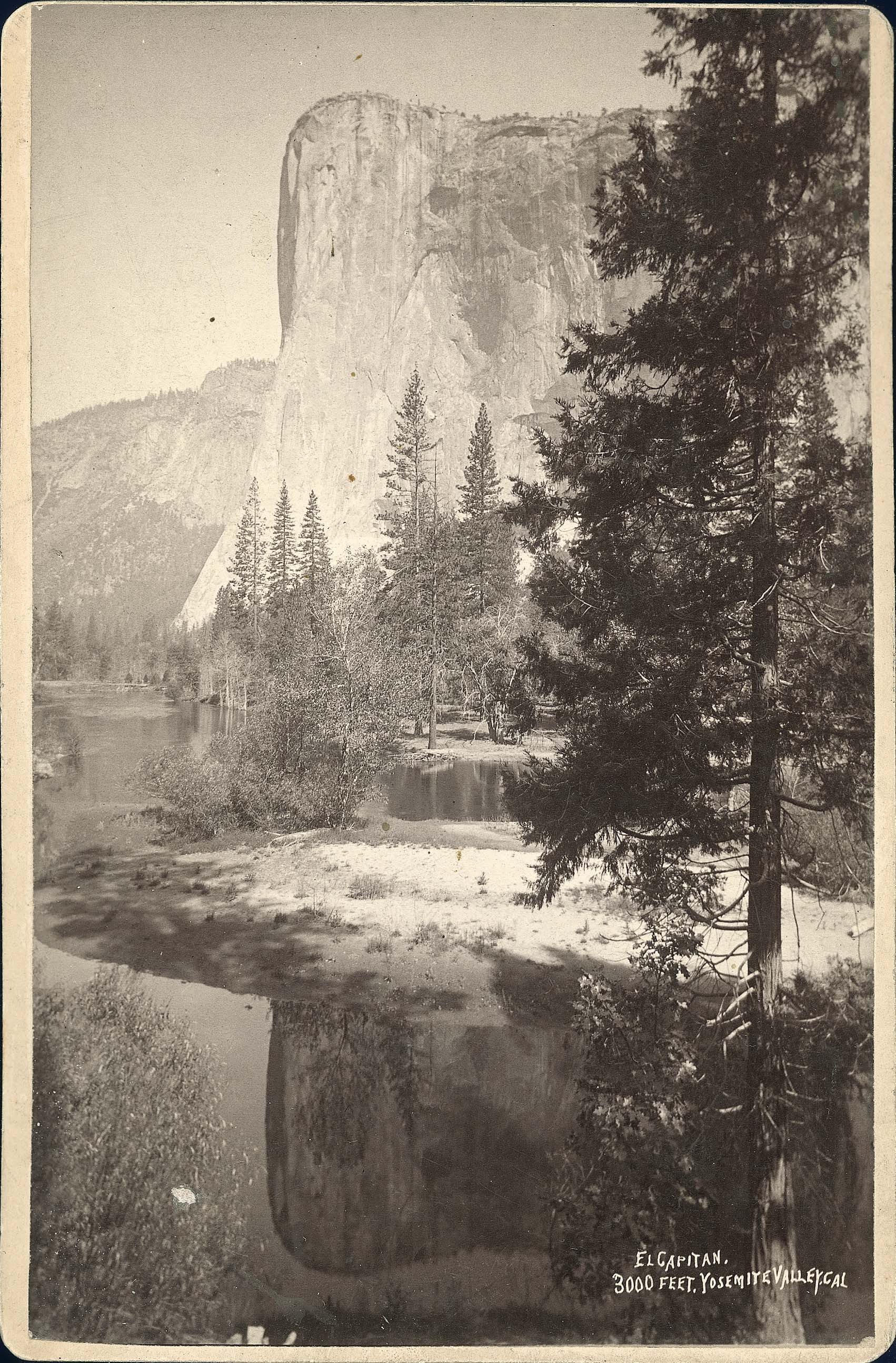
El Capitan, Yosemite Valley by Savage, c. 1879–1889

By 1866 Savage's Views of the Great West, a stereoscopic series, was sold by the Union Pacific and Denver & Rio Grande Western railroads. These railroads gave him a free pass to ride wherever he wanted. The same year he took a tour of major photography studios in the United States, both to improve his photography skills and to publish reproductions of his photos. In San Francisco, he met Carleton Watkins, who described his method for producing large works by placing developed negatives in a water bath until he was ready to finish them. Savage noted that Watkins's method was cumbersome, but envied his results. He traveled by boat to New York City, where progress in photography instruction and technology inspired him. While in New York City, he made an agreement with Samuel R. Wells, who sold photos that Savage took, while Savage sold Wells' publications in his photography studio back in Utah. Savage made similar agreements with other distributors. After having a darkroom wagon custom made, spending $3,400 on photographic supplies from E. and H.T. Anthony Co., he traveled with a group of Mormon settlers back to Salt Lake City. Most of his new supplies were lost when his wagon tipped over while crossing the Platte River on his return trip. Savage paid back some of the debt over nine years, but stopped paying when he was on the verge of bankruptcy. The company sued him, and after a long legal battle, the debt was settled in 1883.

Savage photographed the linking of the Union Pacific and Central Pacific on Promontory Summit, at Promontory, Utah in 1869. This series is considered his most famous work. Other well-known Savage images include pictures of the Great Basin tribes, especially the Paiute and Shoshone. He photographed scenic areas of the West, including Yellowstone National Park, and Zion National Park, and created many images documenting the growth of Utah towns and cities. England-born artist Alfred Lambourne often painted scenes while Savage photographed. Savage also traveled extensively over western North America, taking pictures in areas of Canada and Mexico, and in areas from the Pacific Ocean to Nebraska in the Midwest. Most of Savage's archived photographs, produced by several different early photographic methods, were lost in 1883 in a disastrous studio fire.

Many of Savage's photographs were reproduced in Harper's Weekly newspaper, starting when he left photographs with their offices on his tour of the United States. This partnership continued until 1870, when he began submitting photos to Leslie's Illustrated instead.

In 1870 Savage received an invitation from Brigham Young to be part of Young's visit to the towns of southern Utah. Young's party left on February 25, to travel through Utah's "Dixie". Savage wrote of his experiences during this time in the Improvement Era. He also brought his photography equipment, photographing the main leaders of the trip as well as Little Zion Valley, known today as Zion National Park. Upon Savage's trip home, his five month old son, Enos, had become sick. Enos died shortly after Savage's return. Upon Savage's request, George Ottinger painted a picture of Enos for Annie. Finding solace in his work, Savage left for California a month after Enos' death.

== Art Bazar ==
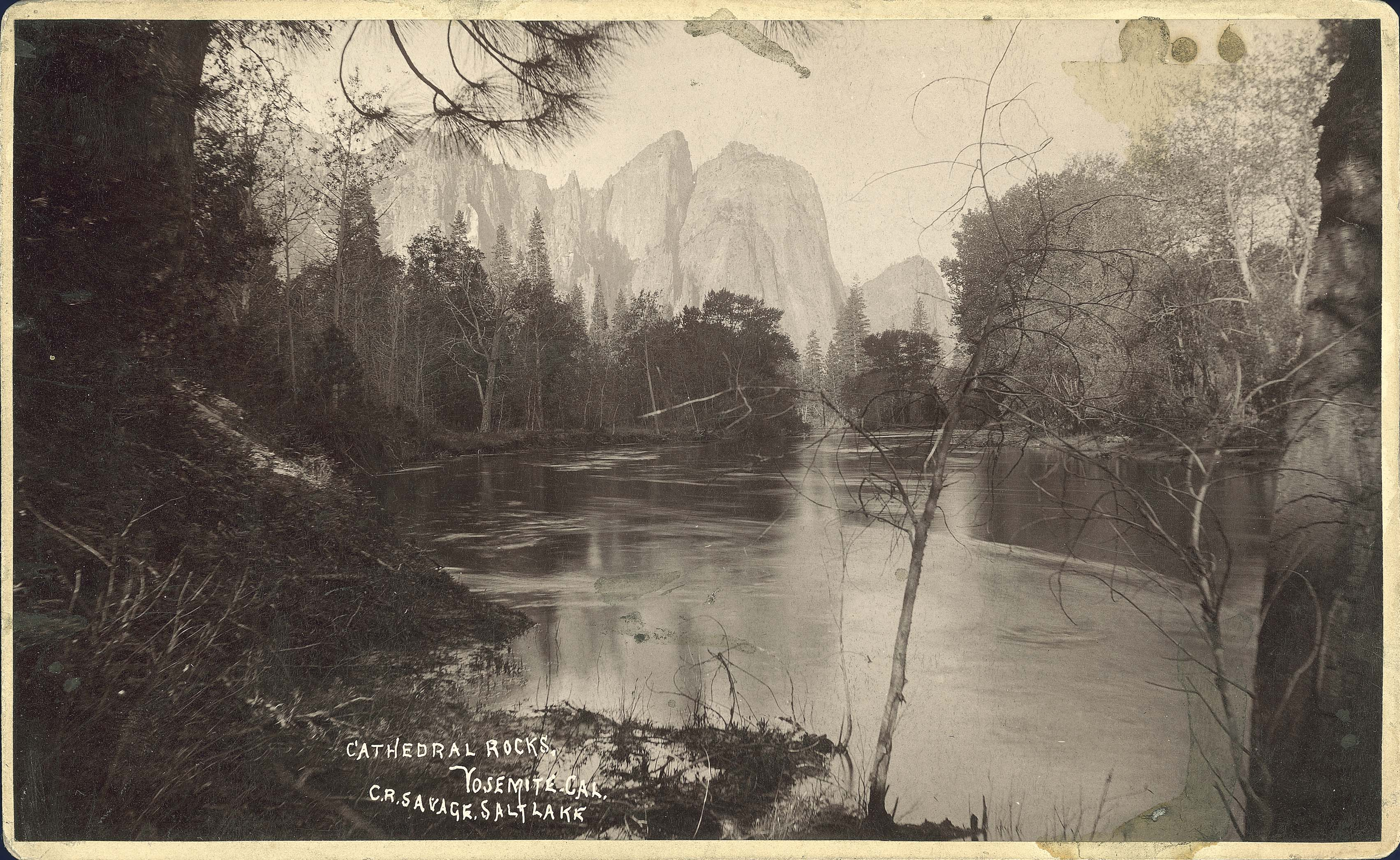
Cathedral Rocks, Yosemite by Savage

Savage's studio was booming by the mid-1870s. Many tourists arrived at his Pioneer Art Gallery to buy photographs of the West. Recognizing the need to develop art appreciation to bolster his clientele in Mormon culture, Savage built the Art Bazar. By the late 1870s demand for photographs was high, and Savage was travelling more frequently in search of photographic opportunities. He photographed the West by travelling on the Denver and Rio Grande Western, Union Pacific, Central Pacific, Utah Central, and other western railroads. Each one gave him a free pass to ride.

Savage took a second wife in 1876, Mary Emma Fowler, a twenty-four-year-old who died five years later in 1881 of "pelvic cellulitis". Polygamous marriages were often common for members of the LDS Church. Three years after Mary's death, Savage married his third wife, Ellen Fenn. The passing of the Edmunds Act slowed the local economy in Salt Lake City; however, tourism kept Savage's Art Bazar financially secure. Many polygamists were arrested and prosecuted during this time. Savage was never arrested, but was assigned by religious officials to visit the Utah Territorial Prison and Utah Penitentiary to preach. As the Edmunds Act proved ineffective, Congress passed the Edmunds-Tucker Act, seizing LDS church property and assets. Savage traveled East to lobby against the Edmunds-Tucker Act. Ultimately, his efforts failed, and in an effort to help Utah become a state, LDS President Woodruff announced the 1890 Manifesto renouncing polygamy.

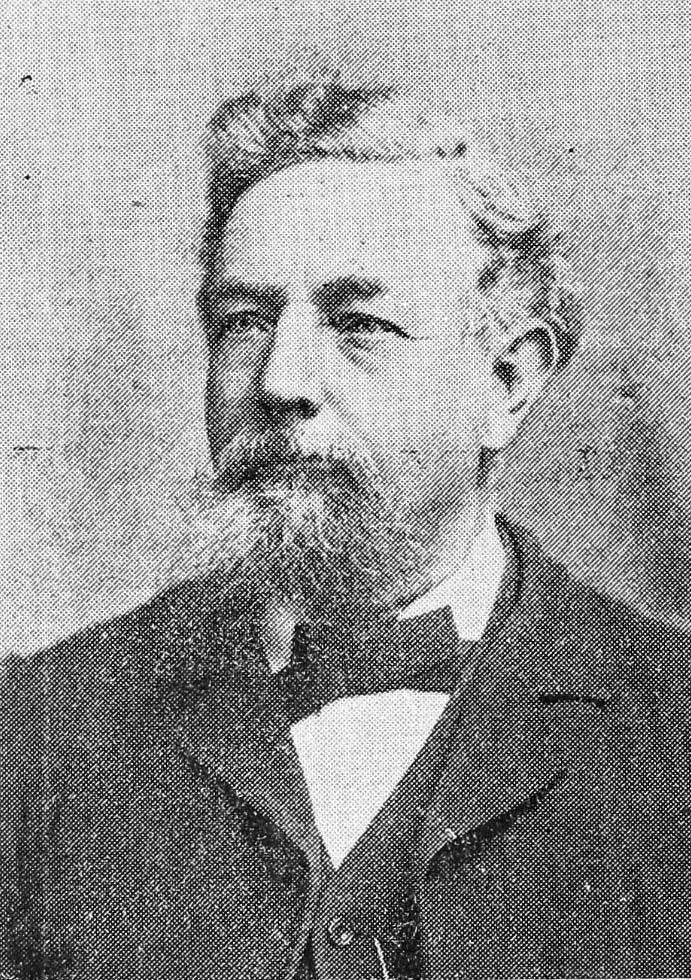
Portrait of Savage, as published on Character Builder Magazine, 1904

By the 1880s, Savage's photographs were famous in many states. However, on June 26, 1883, the day he managed to become debt free, a fire burned down the Art Bazar. The origin of the fire is still unknown. The fire destroyed his glass-plate negative collection, and his famous photographs could no longer be reproduced. Savage estimated the damage to be worth upwards of $12,000 but the insurance policy only covered $4,000. The community rallied together in order to fund and build a new studio. With the community's help and a small loan, Savage opened a new Art Bazar six months later. To advertise for the new Art Bazar, he started publishing a newspaper called The Busy Bee. The newspaper promoted his business as well as other local businesses but only lasted a few years. Having already established a reputation for quality photography, Savage decided to try dry plate photography. He was able to operate at an increasing speed and started quickly retaking the photographs that had helped make him famous. Many of the western railroads later used these new photographs to advertise their rail lines.

As Salt Lake City expanded, many photographers decided to set up shop around Savage. He helped many of his apprentices start their own businesses. Competition began to grow. To have an edge over other photography studios, the Art Bazar began selling Valentine's Day cards.

In April 1892 Savage photographed the completion of the Salt Lake City LDS temple's exterior. The next year on Thanksgiving Day, Savage's first wife, Annie, died from kidney disease. As Savage grew older, he handed the responsibility of the Art Bazar to his sons, Ralph and George. The ease of dry plate photography hurt business as amateur photographers were becoming numerous. The Art Bazar expanded to sell photography equipment to amateur photographers. Around 1906, Savage retired from the Art Bazar, letting the next generation continue his business. At 63 he married a widow, Annie Smith Clowes. Upon Savage's invitation, the Inter-Mountain Photographers Association held their convention at the Art Bazar in 1908. Savage took many trips in his old years and wrote travelogues which were printed in local papers. In January 1909 upon visiting the Art Bazar, he complained to his son George that he was not feeling well. His condition worsened and he died early in the morning, February 3, 1909, of heart failure.

== Family ==
One of Savage's daughters, Luacine Annetta Savage, married J. Reuben Clark, who would become a member of the LDS Church First Presidency.

== Legacy ==
Savage was a widely known railroad photographer. His photographs covered fifty years of changes "from the early stages of the Old West to the beginnings of the Industrial Age." Upon his death, John P. Meakin wrote that Savage "was the loving peasant prince of Utah." Savage's sons, Ralph, Roscoe, and George, continued running the Art Bazar after his death. Ralph Savage was chosen by the LDS Church to photograph the interior of the Salt Lake Temple. His photographs were published in The House of the Lord. The Art Bazar almost burned down again a few years after Savage's death. It was only partially damaged, and the main building remained intact. However, the fire destroyed Savage's negatives from the last 25 years of his life. The Savage family re-opened the Art Bazar to the public but mainly sold novelty items and picture frames rather than photographs. The Art Bazar closed completely on December 31, 1926.

== Selected works ==
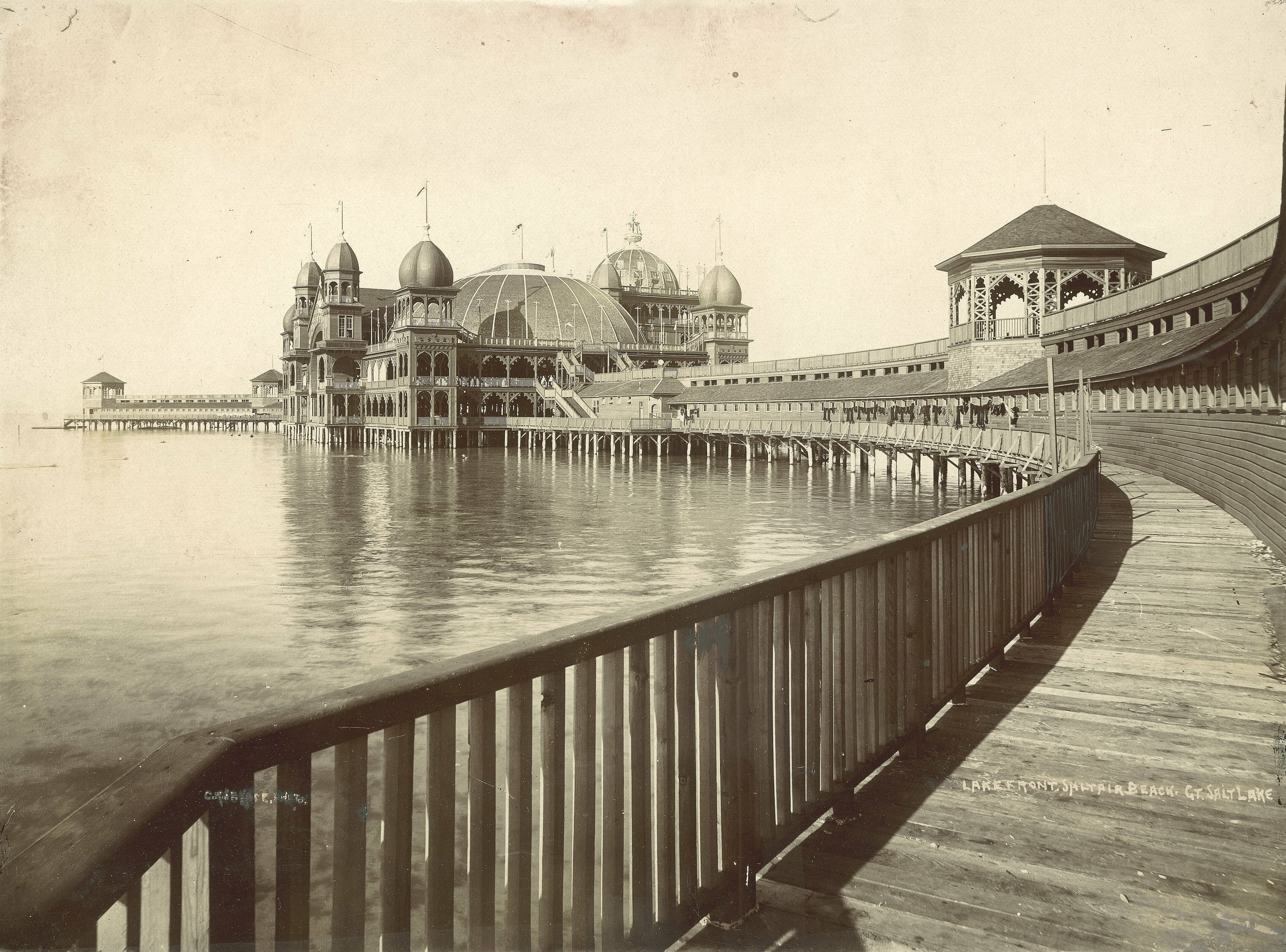
Saltair Beach

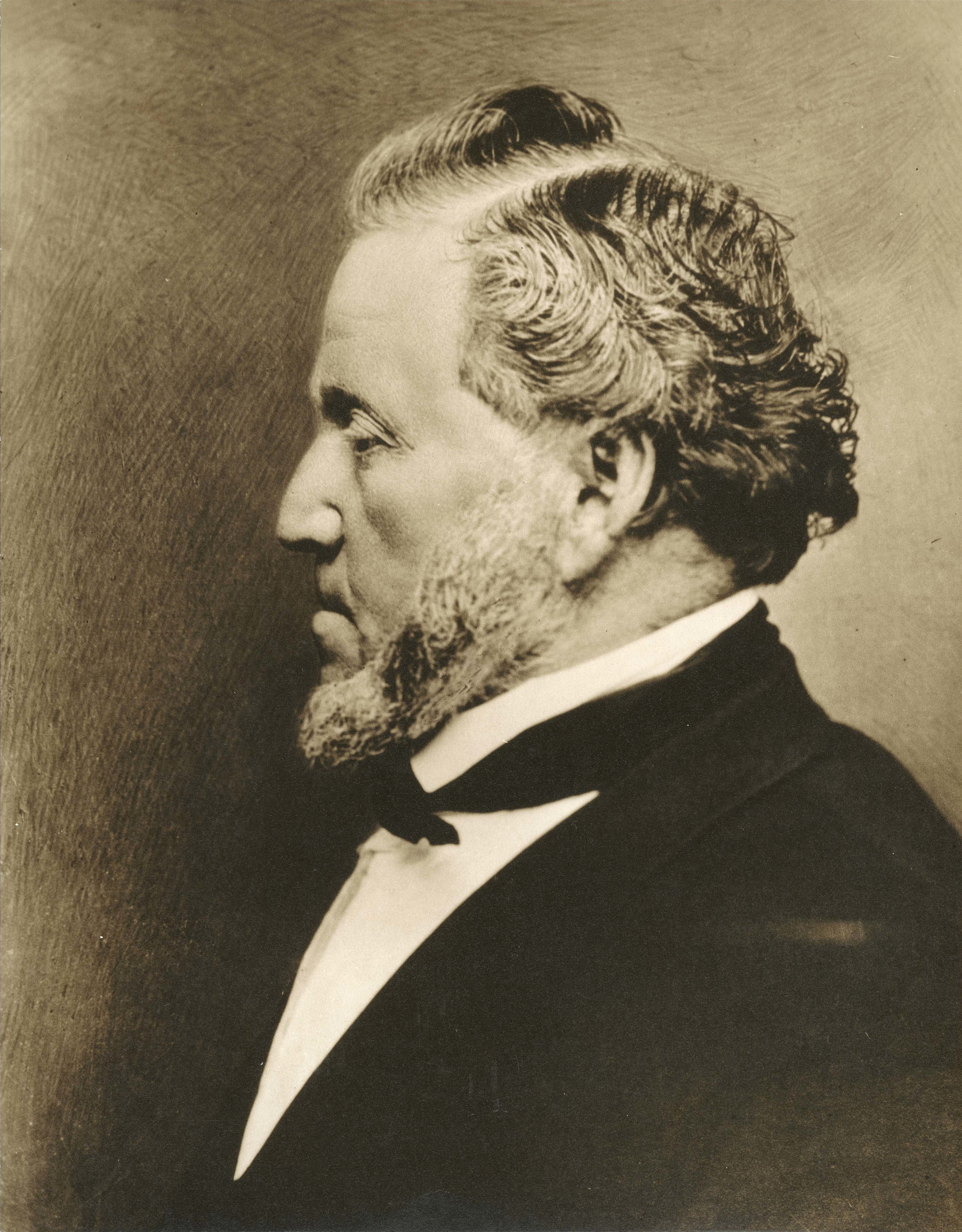
Portrait of Brigham Young

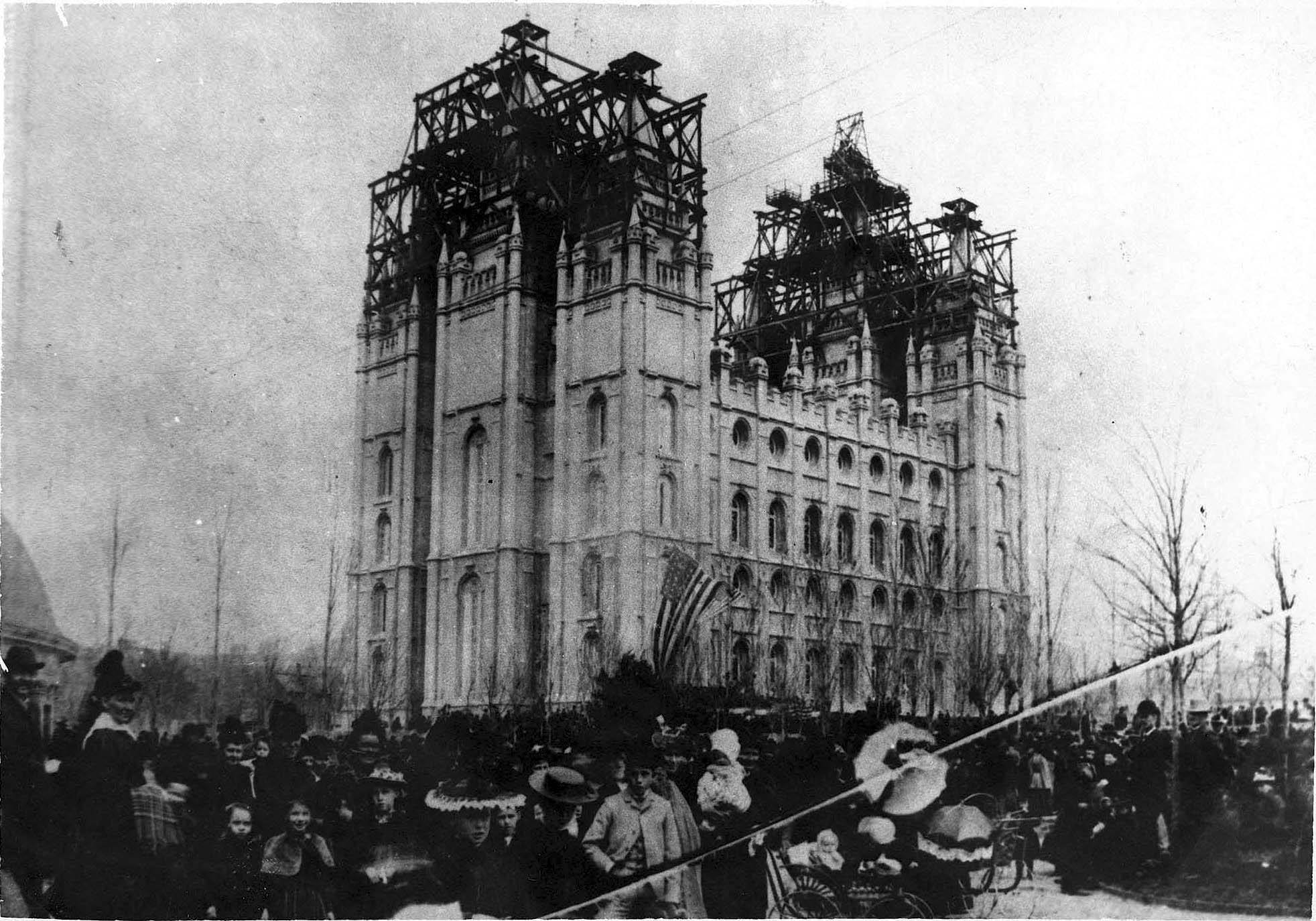
Laying capstone of S.L. Temple

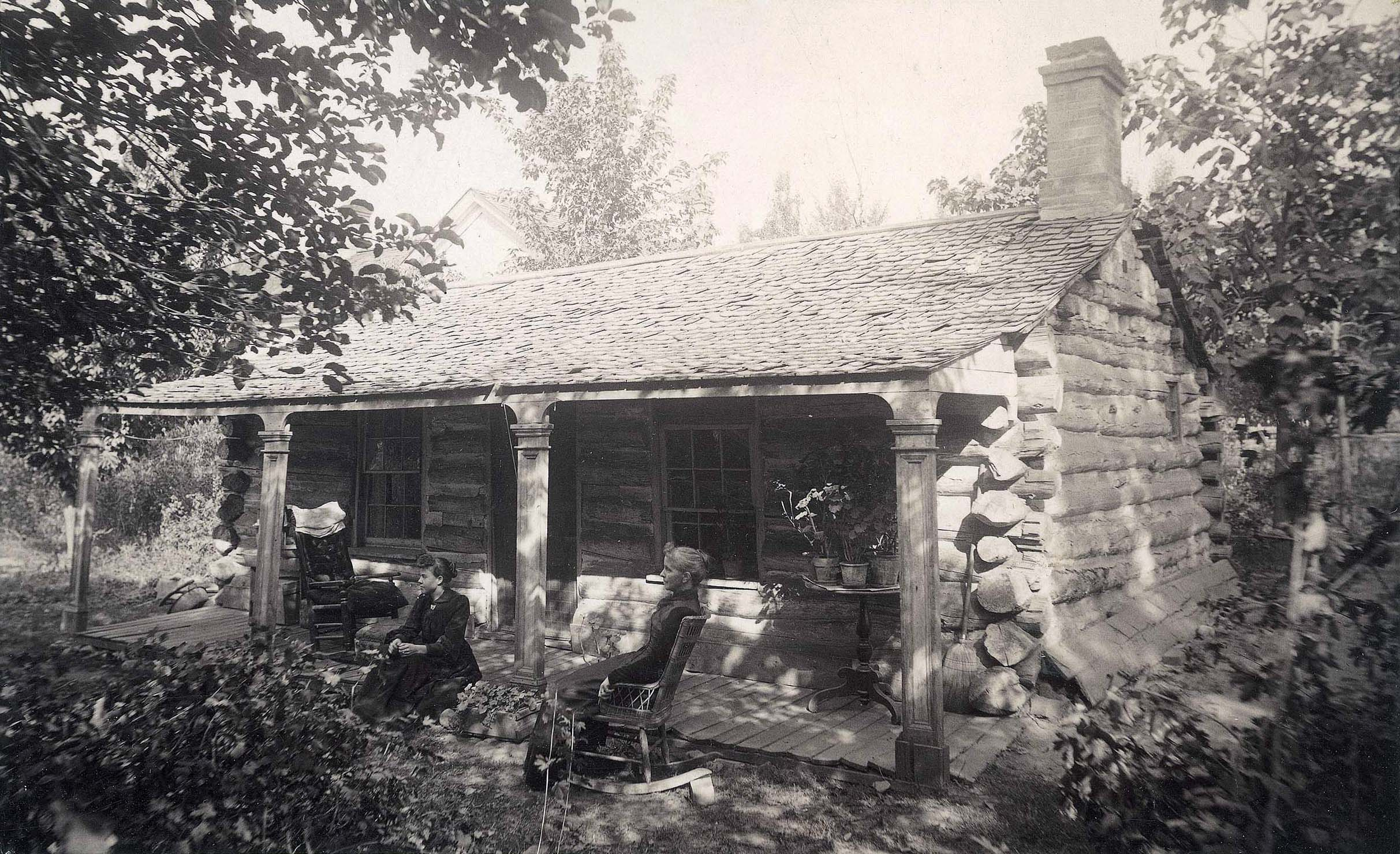
Two women in front of cabin

== Publications ==
- C. R. Savage. Salt Lake City, and the way thither. Nelsons' Pictorial Guide-Books. London: T. Nelson; Salt Lake City: Savage and Ottinger, 1872?. OCLC 4994542
- C. R. Savage. Salt Lake City: with a sketch of the route of the Central Pacific Railroad, from Omaha to Salt Lake City, and thence to San Francisco. London: T. Nelson; Salt Lake City: Savage and Ottinger, 1874?. OCLC 893023669
- C. R. Savage. Pictorial reflex of Salt Lake City and vicinity: including letter-press description and illustrations of public edifices, hotels, business blocks, churches, Indians, bathing resorts, etc., and a variety of information valuable for the tourist or resident, from reliable sources. Salt Lake City: [C. R. Savage], 1892. OCLC 4961205.
- C. R. Savage. The reflex of Salt Lake City and vicinity: including letter-press description and illustrations of public edifices, hotels, business blocks, churches, Indians, bathing resorts, etc., and a variety of information valuable for the tourist or resident, from reliable sources. Salt Lake City: [C. R. Savage], 1893?. OCLC 5230962.
- C. R. Savage. Salt Lake City in photo-gravure from recent negatives. New York: A. Wittemann, ©1894. OCLC 83118308.
- Frank S. Thayer; C. R. Savage; Smiths-Brooks Printing. In and around Salt Lake City. Denver, CO: Frank S. Thayer, 1900. OCLC 904561025.
- Salt Lake City and the Way Thither (Note: As cited from The Savage View and The Beautiful Illusion of Substance)
- Views of Utah and Tourist's Guide
- Views of the Great West

== Bibliography ==
- "C. R. Savage Collection". lib.byu.edu. Harold B. Lee Library.
- "Crocker Art Museum Store".
- "Death Certificate". State of Utah. February 5, 1909.
- Richards, Bradley W. (1995). The Savage view: Charles Savage, pioneer Mormon photographer. Nevada City, Calif.: Carl Mautz Pub. ISBN 9780962194061.
- Rowley, Dennis (1990). The beautiful illusion of substance: Four photographers and the American West. An exhibition selected from the BYU Photo Archives, Harold B. Lee Library. Provo, Utah: Friends of the Brigham Young University Library.
