= Utah State Route 199 =

State highway in Utah, United States

State Route 199

Route information
- Maintained by UDOT
- Length: 21.960 mi (35.341 km)
- Existed: 1969–present

Major junctions
- West end: SR-196 in Dugway
- East end: SR-36 between Rush Valley and Tooele Army Depot

Location
- Country: United States
- State: Utah

Highway system
- Utah State Highway System; Interstate; US; State; Minor; Scenic
← SR-198	→ SR-200

State Route 199 (SR-199) is a state highway in the U.S. state of Utah. Spanning 21.96 miles (35.34 km), it connects SR-196 and the Dugway Proving Ground with SR-36 between Rush Valley and the Deseret Chemical Depot.

== Route description ==
State Route 199 begins at the junction with SR-196 near the control gate at Dugway Proving Ground in Skull Valley. The route travels northeast for 9 miles (14 km), passing through the community of Terra before turning east and climbing over Johnson Pass in the Onaqui Mountains. Descending out of the mountains, the route continues to the east through the town of Clover before ending at SR-36, just north of the Deseret Chemical Depot.

== History ==
In 1920, an improved gravel road over Johnson Pass from St. John to Orr's Ranch (just north of the modern-day terminus of SR-199) was built with the help of a donation from Carl G. Fisher, replacing Skull Valley Road (an unimproved dirt trail) as part of the Lincoln Highway. This road (along with the rest of the Lincoln Highway) was included as part of the state road system as an unnumbered highway from 1919 to 1925.

Further west in Utah (near the current-day Dugway Proving Ground), Frank Seiberling, president of the Lincoln Highway Association and the Goodyear Tire and Rubber Company committed $100,000 to build a 40-mile (64 km) short cut across the desert from County Well (west of Orr's Ranch) to Gold Hill, which would be known as the Goodyear Cut-off. After completing only 7 miles (11 km), the state of Utah reevaluated its long-term highway plan and terminated the project, and instead, began constructing the Wendover Cut-off farther north. Utah officials favored this route, as it would keep southern California-bound motorists in the state longer by forcing them to take the Arrowhead Trail (now Interstate 15) south from Salt Lake City. The Wendover route became part of the Victory Highway, established in 1921.

With the passage of the Federal Aid Highway Act of 1921, the federal government provided $75 million in matching funds to states for highway construction, but it required states to identify a maximum of 7% of its highway mileage as eligible for funds. The Wendover Cut-off was the sole highway west of Salt Lake City selected by Utah to receive federal funds, further cementing its status (over the Goodyear Cut-off) as the primary route from Utah to Northern California.

The Wendover Cut-off was opened on July 13, 1925, and the system of United States Numbered Highways assigned it as part of U.S. Route 40 the following year. Furthermore, the state of Utah made this route part of the newly designated Utah State Route 4 in 1927. This forced the Lincoln Highway Association to accept the Wendover road as the route of the Lincoln Highway, to which it realigned in 1927. As a result of these changes, the road through St. John, Orr's Ranch, and the Goodyear Cut-off were left off the state highway system.

State Route 199 was added to the state highway system in 1969, connecting Dugway with SR-36 south of Stockton, closely following the original Lincoln Highway stretch from St. John (now part of Rush Valley) to Orr's Ranch (just north of Dugway). A very similar route, SR 215, was designated from St. John to Dugway in 1957. This route was cancelled in 1959, and the road was never built.

== Major intersections ==
The entire route is in Tooele County.

Location	mi	km	Destinations	Notes
Dugway Proving Ground	0.000	0.000	SR-196	Western terminus
	7.049	11.344	Lincoln Highway	
	21.960	35.341	SR-36	Eastern terminus
1.000 mi = 1.609 km; 1.000 km = 0.621 mi
