= Stansbury Mountains =

Mountain range in Tooele County, Utah, United States

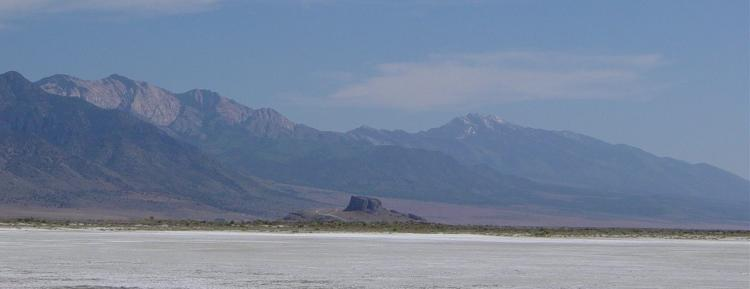
- View south-southeast, from Timpie area

Highest point
- Peak: Deseret Peak
- Elevation: 11,035 ft (3,363 m)
- Coordinates: 40°27′34.25″N 112°37′34.76″W

Dimensions
- Length: 28 mi (45 km) N-S

Geography
- Location within Utah
- Country: United States
- State: Utah
- Regions: Great Basin Desert and Great Salt Lake Desert
- County: Tooele
- Communities: Timpie, Flux, Burmester, Grantsville, Iosepa, Rush Valley, Saint John, Clover and Terra
- Range coordinates: 40°31′02″N 112°38′01″W
- Borders on: Skull Valley, Cedar Mountains, Great Salt Lake, Stansbury Island, Tooele Valley, Rush Valley, Onaqui Mountains and Great Salt Lake Desert

The Stansbury Mountains are a 28-mile (45 km) long mountain range located in eastern Tooele County, Utah. It is named for U.S. Army Major Howard Stansbury, a topographical engineer, who led an expedition that surveyed the region.

The range trends north–south, reaching from the southwest of the Great Salt Lake at Stansbury Bay into the region of the southeast Great Salt Lake Desert. Its southwest perimeter is adjacent to Dugway (and the Dugway Proving Ground), and along its western base lies Skull Valley, which trends north from Dugway. The south of the range contains the Deseret Peak Wilderness, with much of the range as part of the Uinta-Wasatch-Cache National Forest.

== Description ==
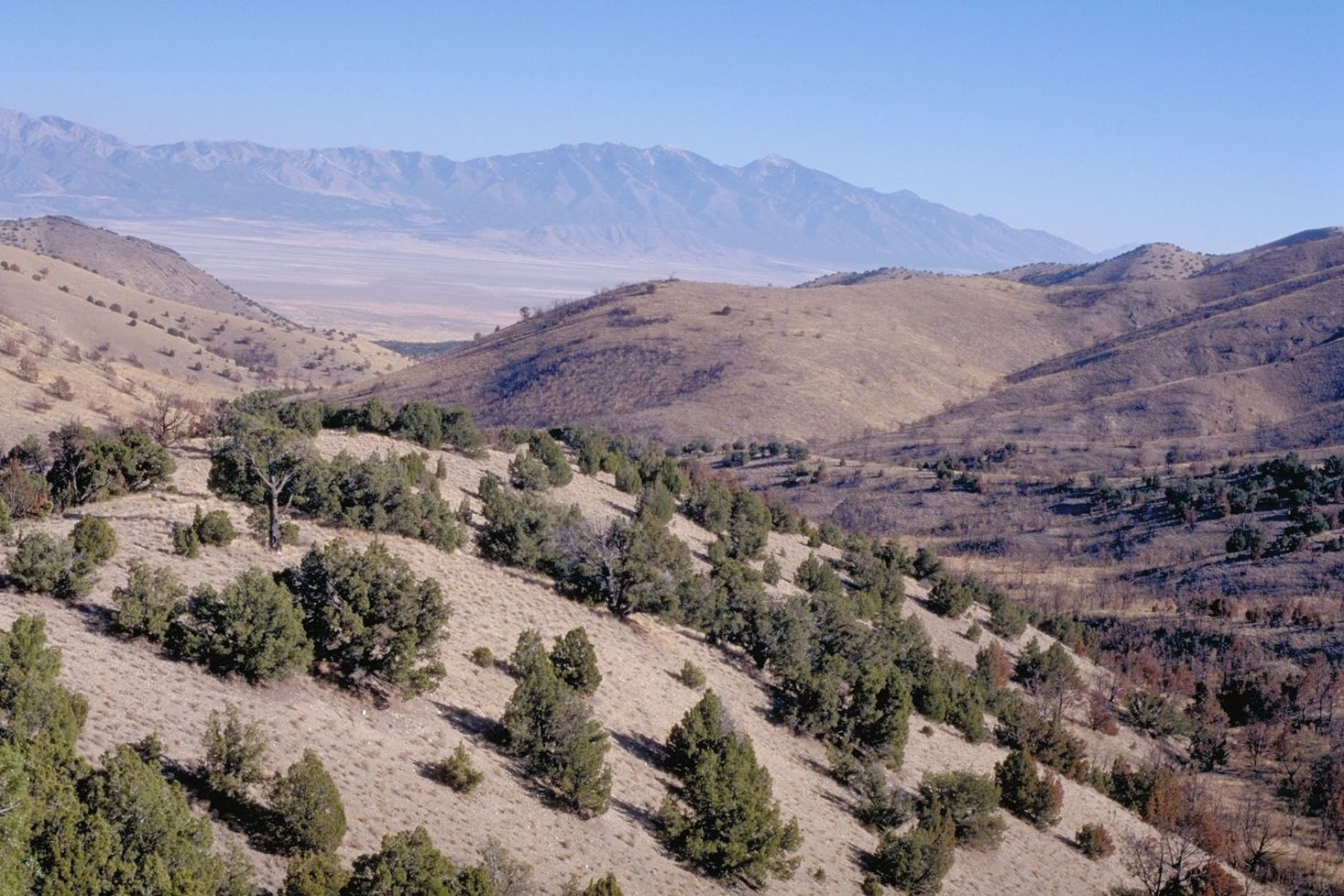
southeast view of west Stansburys, (over Skull Valley), from Cedar Mountain Wilderness, in the Cedar Mountains

The Stansbury Mountains are mostly a massif, with a continuous ridgeline from north to south, and they are connected at their south with the similarly aligned Onaqui Mountains. The range is widest at the south, about 10 miles, and narrows to about 6 miles at the Great Salt Lake. Its northernmost 3 miles narrow at Timpie to Long Rock Basin. At the lakeshore, bordering Timpie and the mountains' foothills, lies Timpie Springs Waterfowl Management Area.

The highpoint of the range is Deseret Peak, 11,035 feet (3,363 m), in the Deseret Peak Wilderness.

Skull Valley borders the range's west, with the Skull Valley Indian Reservation at the southwest foothills, and north of Dugway. Tooele Valley borders the range's east, with the communities of Burmester, Grantsville, and Rush Valley.

== Access ==
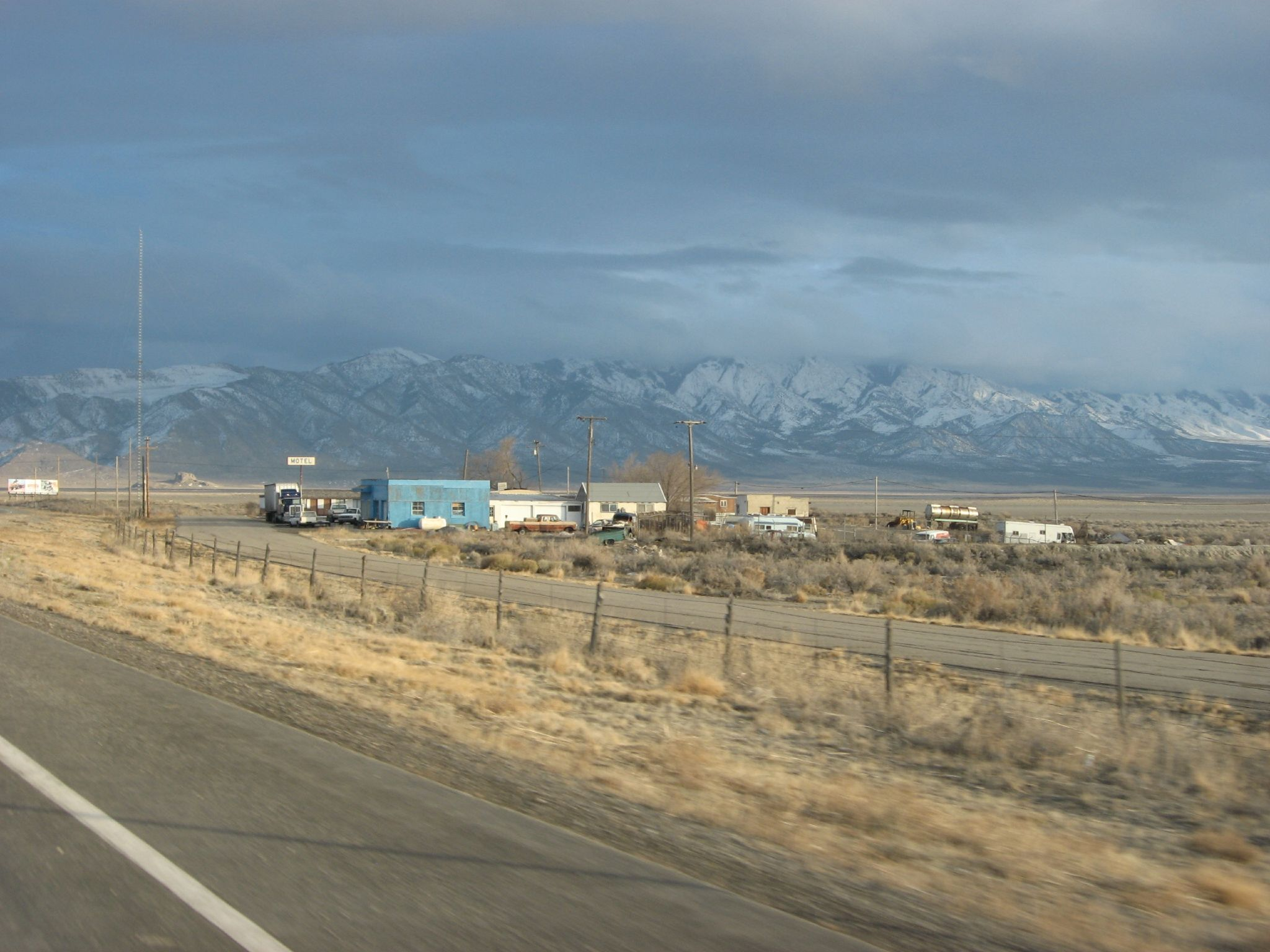
View ESE of northwest region at Delle, northeast foothills of Cedar Mountains

Utah State Route 196 traverses the Skull Valley from Dugway south to Iosepa, valley center, then to Timpie. Only unimproved roads access the west side of the range.

The east side of the range contains numerous communities and the Tooele Army Depot at multiple sites. Utah Route 138 traverses the range's northeast to Grantsville from I-80. Interstate 80 lies at the north end of the range at Timpie, connecting Delle west to Burmester east.

== See also ==
- List of mountains in Utah
