= Lakeside Mountains =

Mountain range in Utah, United States

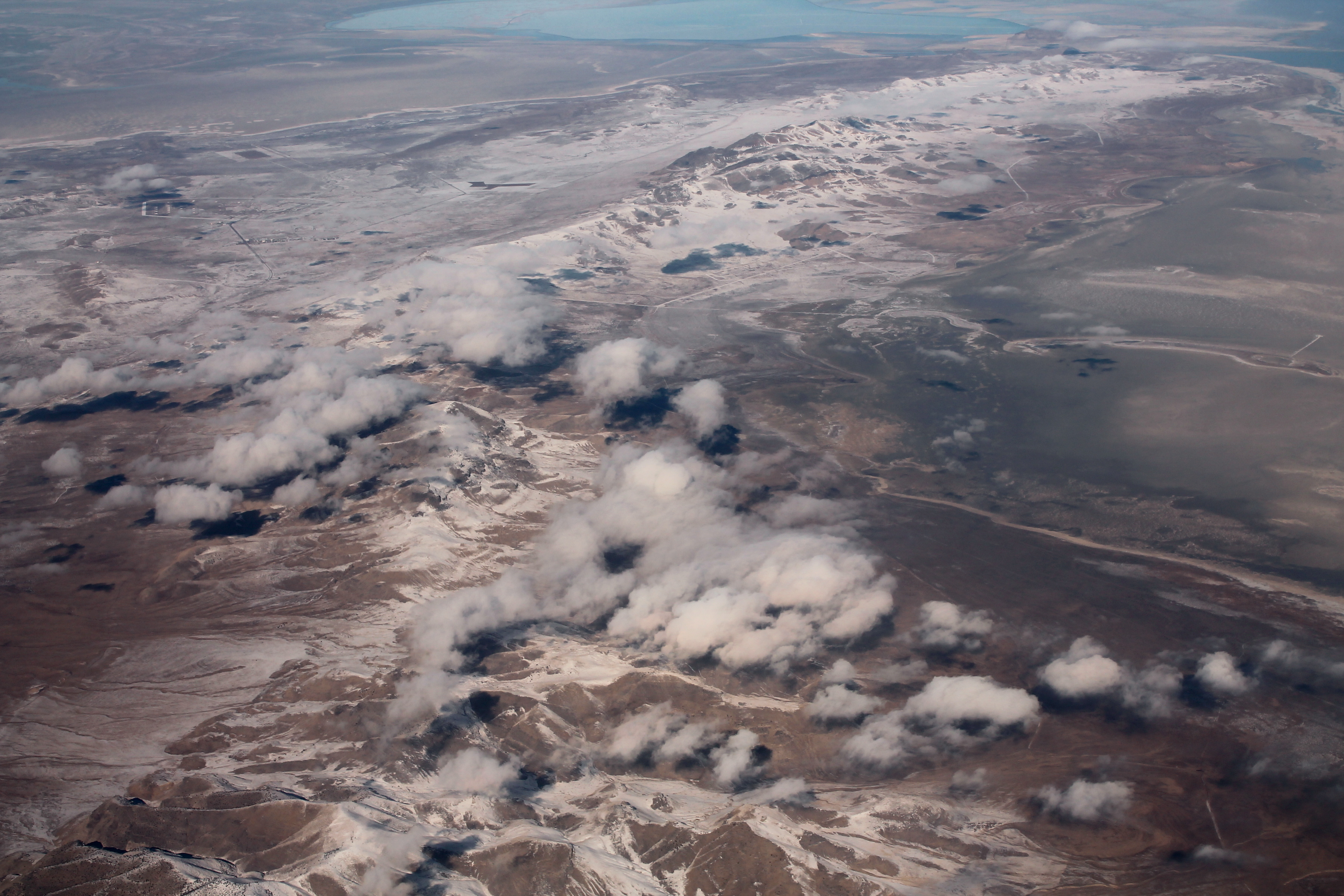

Highest point
- Peak: Craner Peak, (southeast section)-Lakeside Mountains-(~8 mi from south terminus)
- Elevation: 6,625 ft (2,019 m)
- Coordinates: 40°52′48″N 112°49′14″W

Dimensions
- Length: 34 mi (55 km) 13 mi north-trending section, 21 mi southeast section
- Width: 4 mi (6.4 km) (~6 to 4 mi in southeast section), 4 mi in north

Geography
- Location within Utah
- Country: United States
- State: Utah
- Regions: (southwest)-Great Salt Lake (southeast)-Great Salt Lake Desert (northeast)-Great Basin
- Counties: Box Elder and Tooele
- Communities: Lakeside, Delle, (Timpie) and (Low)
- Range coordinates: 40°58′33″N 112°51′52″W
- Borders on: Great Salt Lake Desert-W & WNW; Lakeside, Utah-N; Great Salt Lake-N, NE & E; Skull Valley (Utah)-SSE & S; (Stansbury Mountains-SSE); Cedar Mountains (Tooele County, Utah)-SSW; Grassy Mountains-W & SW

The Lakeside Mountains are about a 34 miles (55 km) long mountain range located on the southwest perimeter of the Great Salt Lake; the range is located in northeast Tooele County and south Box Elder County in Utah, United States.

The range consists of a 13-mile (21 km) long north-trending section, and a southeast stretch composed of variable-height peaks and lower elevations, as well as a massif section containing the mountain range highpoint.

The north section of the range terminus is at the community of Lakeside, Utah, and the region lies on an eastern border of the Great Salt Lake Desert.

== Description ==
The range is linear, with the two trending sections. The north section actually trends slightly north-northeast, with the south part of it as a mountain area, with Sally Mountain, 5,855 feet (1,785 m); north of it, the range turns into ridgelines and small parallel valleys.

=== South section ===
The south section has a due-southeast trendline. A small low elevation saddle separates the south from the north section. Richins Knoll, 4,387 feet (1,337 m) is adjacent the saddle, and the mountains southeast begin with a rise to Jedediah Mountain, 5,837 feet (1,779 m), about 3 mi southeast of the saddle. The highpoint of the range is found southeast from here, Craner Peak, at 6,625 feet (2,019 m).

== Access ==
Interstate 80 crosses the southern terminus of the Lakeside Mountains, at the townsite of Delle. A northwest stretch of I-80 from Delle, skirts the range foothills, then enters the north of the Cedar Mountains, before turning west through the Great Salt Lake Desert. From the north Cedar Mountains, Puddle Valley Highway (improved road) transits due-north through Puddle Valley, then enters the west flank region of the north section of the range; a small valley called "Death Valley", located in a hilly foothill region, borders the Great Salt Lake Desert, on the desert's east, about 3 mi; Death Ridge, a subridge is 1 mi east; the north mountain terminus near Lakeside continues as named: Scad Ridge, Sedal Valley, Cave Ride, Great Salt Lake shoreline, (all 1 mi apart from each other).

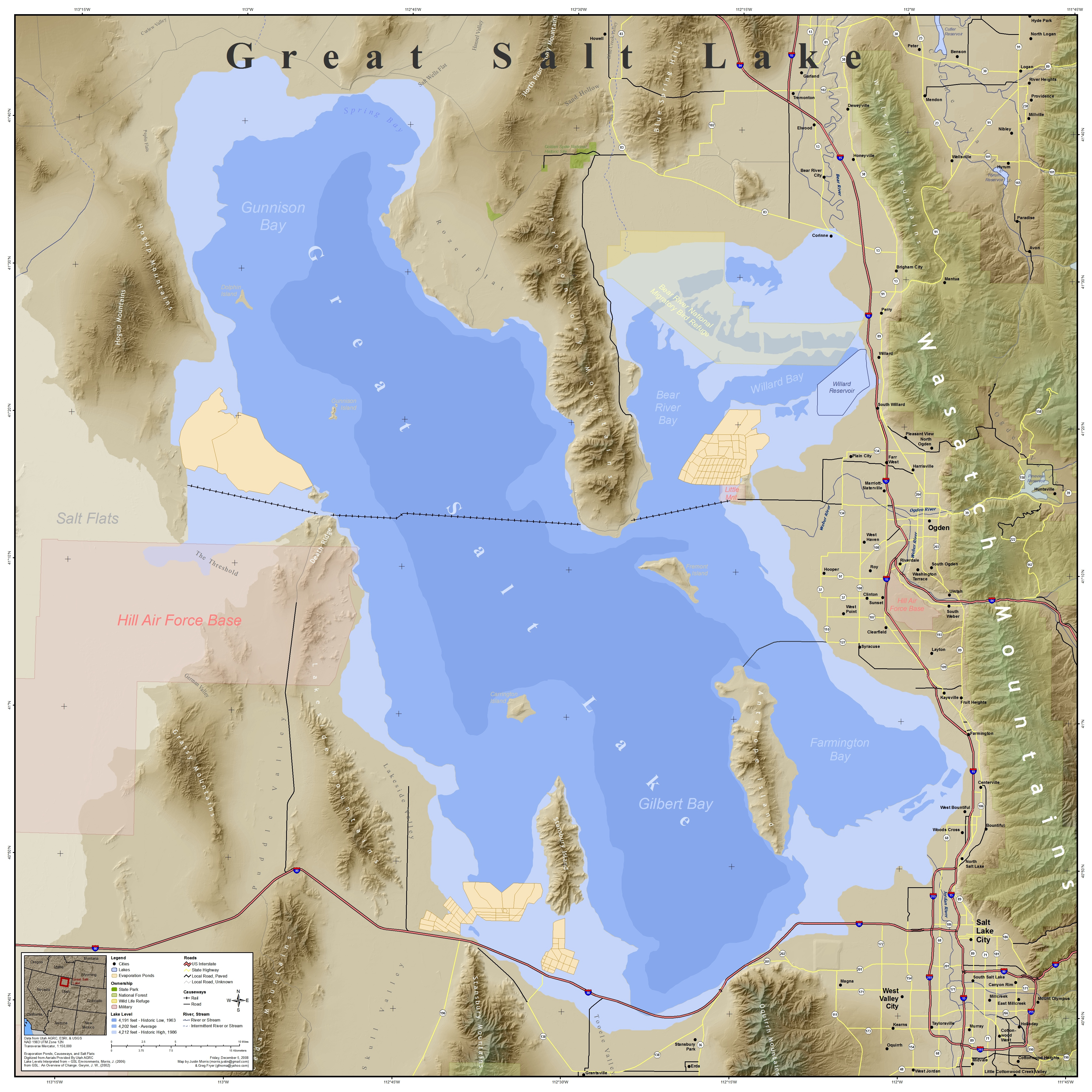
Great Salt Lake and named landforms

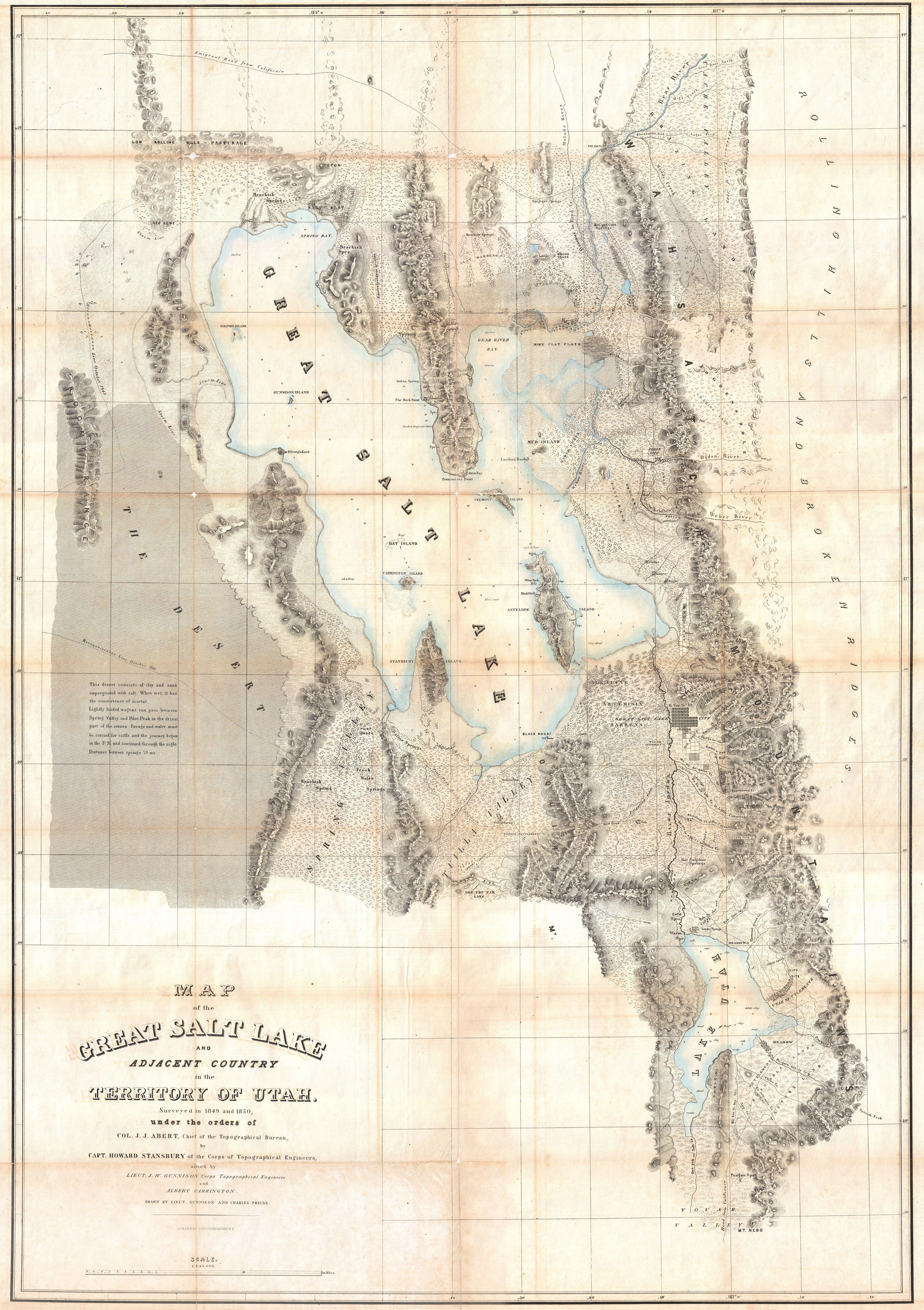
1852 Stansbury Map
