= Deseret Peak Wilderness =

Wilderness area in Utah, United States

- IUCN category Ib (wilderness area)
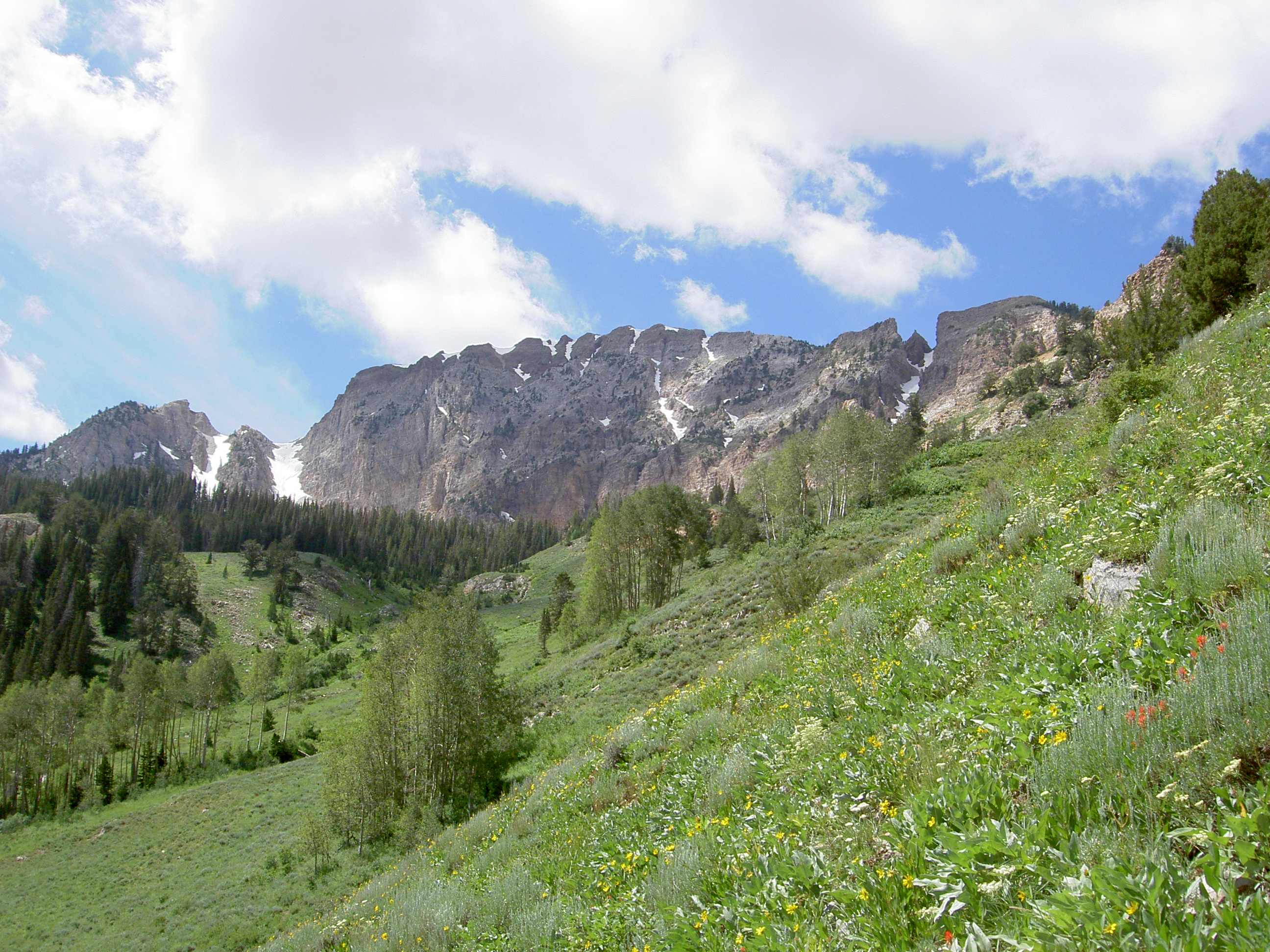
- Deseret Peak

- Location within Utah Location within the United States
- Location: Tooele County, Utah, USA
- Nearest city: Grantsville, UT
- Coordinates: 40°27′50″N 112°37′45″W
- Area: 25,212 acres (102.03 km^{2})
- Established: September 18, 1984
- Governing body: U.S. Forest Service

The Deseret Peak Wilderness is located in the Stansbury Mountains of Tooele County, Utah, United States near the towns of Tooele and Grantsville, not far from the Great Salt Lake. It is part of the Wasatch-Cache (of late the Uinta-Wasatch-Cache) National Forest. This semi-arid wilderness is part of the Great Basin ecosystem. Elevations range from about 6,000 feet (1,800 meters) to the top of Deseret Peak's limestone escarpment at 11,031 feet (3,362 m). In this high country, with barren Skull Valley to the west, you'll find some springs and intermittent creeks, despite the general dryness of the area.

The Stansbury Mountains occupy a biological transition zone from the Great Basin to the Rocky Mountains. Much of the wilderness is alpine, with open basins and barren rocky ridges. From December through May, you can expect the upper elevations to be covered in snow. Douglas-fir, alpine fir and aspen are commonly found growing on high north-facing slopes. Juniper, mountain brush, sagebrush, and grass cover much of the lower terrain. Cattle are still allowed to graze on range allotments in portions of the area.

The summit of Deseret Peak offers a splendid 360-degree view. Backpackers and horse packers enjoy this area. Hunters come in search of mule deer. Some very steep terrain is traversed by the trails. Deseret Peak Wilderness has about five system trails totaling approximately 19 miles (31 km). South Willow Canyon is the most popular trailhead. Access is limited on the west, where the Skull Valley Goshute Reservation is adjacent to the wilderness.

The Deseret Peak Wilderness was a late addition to the Utah Wilderness Act of 1984. The original Stansbury Mountains RARE II roadless area was contiguous to Bureau of Land Management (BLM) wildlands on both north and south. Adjacent Forest Service roadless areas and BLM wilderness study areas remain eligible for designation as wilderness.

== See also ==
- National Wilderness Preservation System
- List of U.S. Wilderness Areas
- Wilderness Act
