= Deseret Peak =

Mountain in Utah, United States

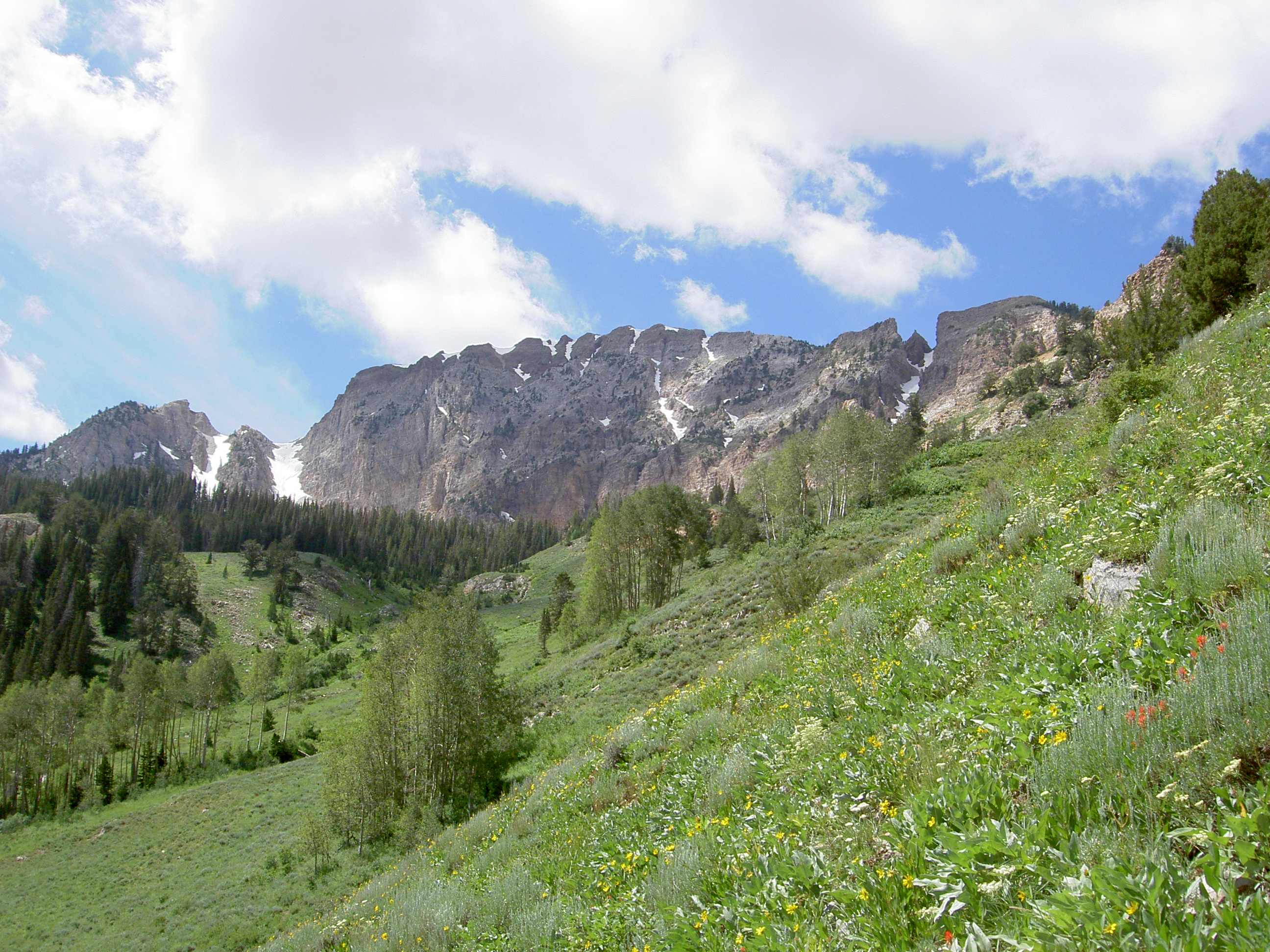

Highest point
- Elevation: 11,035 ft (3,363 m) NAVD 88
- Prominence: 5,812 ft (1,771 m)
- Listing: US most prominent peaks 74th; Utah county high points 17th
- Coordinates: 40°27′34″N 112°37′35″W

Geography
- Location within Utah
- Location: Tooele County, Utah, U.S.
- Parent range: Stansbury Mountains
- Topo map: USGS Deseret Peak West

Deseret Peak is the highest peak in the Stansbury Mountains with an elevation of 11,035 ft. It is located in the Deseret Peak Wilderness area west of Grantsville, Utah and east of Skull Valley Indian Reservation. It is the fourth most topographically prominent peak in the state of Utah. The site is a popular destination for hikers and backcountry skiers as the area is a contrast of the alpine wilderness with the surrounding desert basin. The trail that leads to the peak is easily accessible from Salt Lake City. The mountain offers views of the Bonneville Salt Flats, the Great Salt Lake, and the surrounding towns and mountain ranges. On a clear day, it is possible to see Mount Nebo, the highest peak in the adjacent Wasatch Mountains.

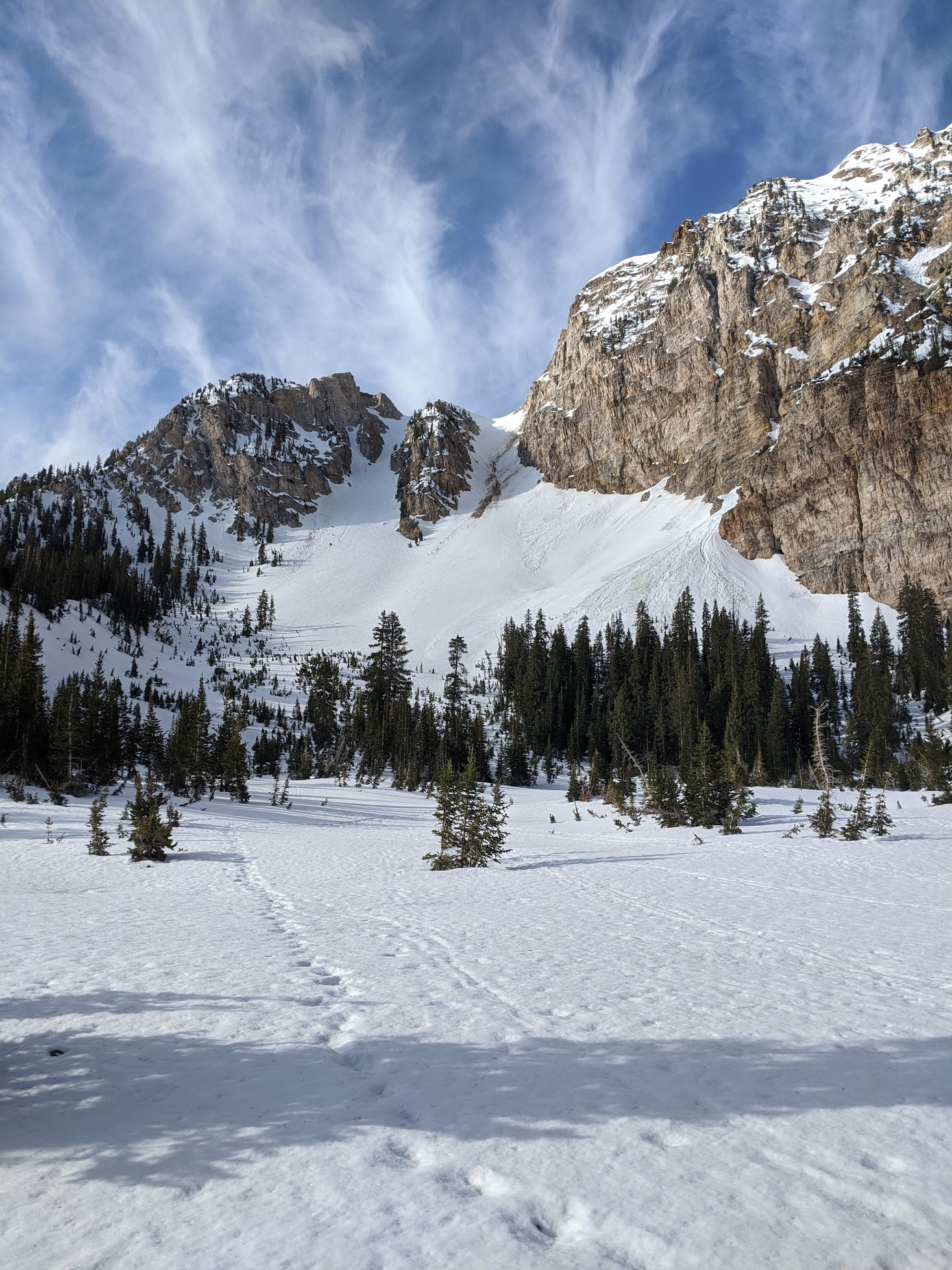
The Twin Couloirs on Deseret Peak, a popular destination for backcountry skiing

From the parking area, there is a 7.4-mile out and back trail that gains 3,595 feet to the summit. The upper portions of the parking lot are closed during the winter months due to snow and it generally opens completely in the month of May.

== Climate ==
Climate data for Deseret Peak 40.4605 N, 112.6269 W, Elevation: 10,558 ft (3,218 m) (1991–2020 normals)
Month	Jan	Feb	Mar	Apr	May	Jun	Jul	Aug	Sep	Oct	Nov	Dec	Year
Mean daily maximum °F (°C)	27.9 (−2.3)	28.0 (−2.2)	32.9 (0.5)	37.8 (3.2)	47.2 (8.4)	58.9 (14.9)	67.9 (19.9)	66.5 (19.2)	57.7 (14.3)	45.0 (7.2)	34.1 (1.2)	27.5 (−2.5)	44.3 (6.8)
Daily mean °F (°C)	19.1 (−7.2)	18.4 (−7.6)	22.8 (−5.1)	27.2 (−2.7)	36.3 (2.4)	47.1 (8.4)	55.8 (13.2)	55.0 (12.8)	46.2 (7.9)	34.9 (1.6)	25.2 (−3.8)	18.9 (−7.3)	33.9 (1.1)
Mean daily minimum °F (°C)	10.4 (−12.0)	8.9 (−12.8)	12.7 (−10.7)	16.6 (−8.6)	25.3 (−3.7)	35.3 (1.8)	43.7 (6.5)	43.4 (6.3)	34.8 (1.6)	24.7 (−4.1)	16.4 (−8.7)	10.3 (−12.1)	23.5 (−4.7)
Average precipitation inches (mm)	5.36 (136)	4.89 (124)	4.64 (118)	4.73 (120)	4.49 (114)	2.55 (65)	1.50 (38)	1.26 (32)	2.24 (57)	3.73 (95)	4.00 (102)	5.21 (132)	44.6 (1,133)
Source: PRISM Climate Group

== See also ==
- List of Ultras of the United States
