= Private Fuel Storage =

Consortium to store spent nuclear fuel

Private Fuel Storage LLC (PFS) was a nuclear power industry consortium organized to manage spent nuclear fuel based in La Crosse, Wisconsin. The plan was to store it above-ground in dry casks on the Goshute's Skull Valley Indian Reservation, Tooele County, Utah. It was withdrawn in 2012.

== Project history ==
=== DOE ownership ===
The Department of Energy took responsibility for the disposal of spent nuclear fuel (SNF) in the Nuclear Waste Policy Act of 1982 (NWPA). A temporary Monitored Retrievable Storage (MRS) program was expected to be used alongside a geological storage (permanent) program. Eventually the latter focused on Yucca Mountain nuclear waste repository, and MRS was evaluated on many different sites. Department of Energy (DOE) was told to take title to the SNF no later than 1998. By 1987 DOE planned to build the facility near Oak Ridge, Tennessee on federal land as government nuclear research projects meant skilled personnel and infrastructure were already in place. Opposition to the Oak Ridge location led to its prohibition in a 1987 amendment to the NWPA.

=== Nuclear Waste Negotiator ===
This 1987 amendment also created the Office of the United States Nuclear Waste Negotiator (ONWN), which was active in the early 1990s after its first negotiator, David Leroy, was appointed in 1991. Leroy described the government as "seek[ing] volunteers" of counties and tribes willing to host a MRS. After rounds of grants and applications to the counties and tribes, the willing sites was reduced to Indian reservations that had the tribal sovereignty to host spent fuel, as counties were described by Leroy as having "angry mobs" opposed to it. This was considered "particularly reprehensible from an ethical standpoint because of the long and often destructive history of Indian involvement in U.S. nuclear programs." By March 1993 only four tribes remained interested in the project, and by August 1993 two were in negotiations: the Mescalero tribe's Mescalero Apache Indian Reservation in New Mexico and the Goshute tribe's Skull Valley Indian Reservation in Utah. The ONWN was defunded in late 1993 and expired in 1995.

The Skull Valley band applied for grants created by the 1987 program and by 1990. The first round of grants, approximately $100,000, funded the band executive committee's travel to Sacramento, California's Rancho Seco nuclear plant, Washington state's Hanford Site, Florida Power & Light nuclear facilities, and Virginia's Surry Nuclear Power Plant. The second phase of grants, approximately $200,000, sent the committee to Japan's Fugen nuclear plant and Tōkai reprocessing facility, France's La Hague reprocessing facility, UK's Sellafield power/reprocessing/storage facility, and Sweden's Clab storage facility.

=== Private Fuel Storage, LLC creation ===
After ONWN wound down, MRS efforts were picked up by a private consortium, Private Fuel Storage, LLC, led by Xcel Energy (via Northern States Power Company's Jim Howard and the "locally visible and vocal" engineer, Scott Northard) to store 30,000 metric tons (30,000 long tons) on 450 acres (180 ha) of Mescalero land in New Mexico, called the Mescalero Utility Fuel Storage Initiative. This was controversial and opposed by many in the tribe as well as New Mexico's senators Jeff Bingaman and Pete V. Domenici. The Mescalero tribe voted against the $250 million deal in 1995, then proceeded into a second referendum and accusations of coercion and outside involvement, though the vote supposedly ended in PFS's favor, leading Tom Udall (then the New Mexico Attorney General) to state "It appears to me that the tribal leadership has strong-armed members to get this result", with allegations of job losses to opponents, intimidation through killing horses and dogs of a tribe member, and assaulting children. The agreement had a minority of tribal members on its board (4 from the tribe, 5 from PFS), and there was a possibility for the transfer the SNF title to the tribe. The tribe broke off negotiations in 1996.

Negotiations with the Goshute tribe were ongoing and became primary. Xcel/Northern claimed 33 companies were involved, but by 1995 there were only 10 companies, and when Private Fuel Storage was organized in 1996 the number was reduced to eight, being Xcel/Northern, Southern Nuclear, Genoa FuelTech, Southern California Edison, Entergy (via ConEd), American Electric Power (via Indiana-Michigan Power), Florida Power and Light, and FirstEnergy. Boston Edison withdrew in 1997 after citizen objections, and Illinois Power sold its share to Florida Power in 2000. Wisconsin Electric and Pacific Gas and Electric Company (PG&E) also withdrew. General Public Utilities had merged with Xcel Energy.

The Private Fuel Storage project would have stored approximately 44,000 metric tons (43,000 long tons) of spent fuel in 4000 Holtec International dry casks on 98 acres (40 ha) of Goshute land. The fuel would have come from over 100 power plants in a project worth approximately $3 billion and was technically temporary storage.

Some of the Goshutes were in favor of the project for the economic boost, including Danny Quintana, a non-Indian attorney representing the tribe in the project, who described the tribe as "very astute in terms of business deals" in 1995. It was also opposed by others in the tribe and by many outside groups, such as Senators Orrin Hatch and Bob Bennett, and House Representatives Rob Bishop, Chris Cannon, James V. Hansen, Jim Matheson, Utah governors Mike Leavitt (who famously said "over my dead body" to the proposal) and Jon M. Huntsman Jr., and Salt Lake City mayor Rocky Anderson. The conflict and concerns reached the front page of the New York Times in 1998.

Legal protection under the Price–Anderson Nuclear Industries Indemnity Act, even for private operation on Indian lands, was settled with 1999's El Paso Natural Gas Co. v. Neztsosie, which noted Price-Anderson's "unmistakable preference for a federal forum". Still, Price-Anderson had many unanswered questions and grey areas for the project.

=== Leon Bear and tribal disputes ===
Leon D. Bear (February 14, 1956 (age 70)), identified as chairman of the Goshutes by PFS, had pushed for the project, describing it as appropriate given the surrounding toxic sites that already existed. Mary Allen, a Goshute executive committee member, doubted the tribe could handle it, as did tribe member Margene Bullcreek, who said about $300,000 had been granted to the tribe by 1995.

Bear shaped tribal decisions by attaching tribal money to them, in contrast to the previously equal distribution of funds. For instance, the tribe's 1998 Christmas bonuses were tied to acceptance of the PFS project and would result in $6000 bonuses for supporters and $400 bonuses for those against PFS. In 2000 a tribe member stated "everyone who supports the facility has a new truck—if you don't support Leon, you don't have anything", showing the lack of voice and access to the tribe and the shaping of the tribe's identity through the distorted narrative.

In April 1999 the tribe passed a resolution stating that all tribal documents are confidential and proprietary to "protect the Band from outsiders". After this point the committee attendance (sign-in) sheet was a legal agreement, binding members to confidentiality. Some members refused to sign such a document.

In March 1999, eighteen tribe members including Sammy Blackbear (April 18, 1964 (age 62)) and Margene Bullcreek sued BIA over the legality of the 1997 lease agreement, which they BIA approved (per the Indian Long-Term Leasing Act) in three days, an unusually prompt event. The Blackbear/Bullcreek suit was dismissed in February 2000 without prejudice (and upheld in an April 2000 appeal) as it had not met a ripeness threshold. They proceeded to appeal BIA's approval of the lease agreement in September 2000 and were joined by other parties including the Ohngo Gaudedah Devia Awareness (OGDA or OGD) and the State of Utah. This was then filed as a lawsuit on 2 May 2001, over the legality of the 1997 lease agreement, stating the "Bear regime" (Leon and his uncle Lawrence) had been recalled in 1994 over the spent fuel storage, and the Blackbears had been elected. BIA continued to support the Bear leadership, which continued to support the PFS project. Bullcreek indicated Bear had begun to receive payments from PFS in 1996, then signed the lease and received BIA approval. Blackbear alleged that Leon Bear had made "extraordinary purchases" for personal use and also did not allocate PFS project money to the tribe.

The following day, as part of a NRC ASLPB investigation, Leon Bear and John Donnell (PFS project member working for Stone & Webster) were deposed. The transcript was then released on 17 May 2001 in redacted form after a protective order was granted. Bear noted there were 112 people enrolled in the tribe, and "about 15" lived on the reservation. No members of the tribe were employed at Tekoi, compared with several in 1995. Donnell indicated he believed Bear to be the chairman of the tribe but did not verify it. He recalled being at a General Council meeting of the tribe where Bullcreek "challenged Leon's role in leadership". Bear was the tribal secretary in 1990–1991; he was elected as chair in November 1995 and again in November 2000; his uncle, Lawrence Bear, was the previous chair. Bear presented the executed lease with PFS to the council.

In Utah and OGD's complaints surrounding environmental justice issues under Pres. Clinton's Executive Order 12898, in 2002 the licensing board ordered the Skull Valley Band to account for lease revenues and distribution to the Band, defining OGD as a minority subgroup. On behalf of the Band, attorney Tim Vollmann contended this violated tribal sovereignty and was intervening in "internal tribal governmental matters", also noting Utah's FOIA request to the DOI for the lease details was filled, with compensation amounts redacted as confidential proprietary information. While discussing the accusations of embezzlement, Vollmann noted the tribal leaders "are currently cooperating with a pending federal law enforcement investigation", but stated that wasn't under the ASLPB's purview. Leon Bear stated that disclosing revenues, including from PFS, and the allocation to members, "would violate tribal law and custom."

Leon Bear was criminally indicted by a federal grand jury in December 2003 on two counts of thefts from Indian Tribal Organizations, one count of theft of programs receiving federal funds, over conversion and embezzlement of the Goshute funds: nearly $130,000 from an economic development office and over $25,000 by double-dipping travel stipends. He was also charged with three counts of falsifying tax returns (from 2000 to 2002), which required enforcing an IRS summons. In an unrelated case, Bear and tribal businesses, Starlike Properties Inc. and Diversified Acquisition Star LLC, were also under investigation for tax fraud from a Japanese Yen currency put option in 1998.

In 2005, Bear pleaded guilty to lesser charges and was required to pay $31,000 to the tribe account and $13,000 in federal taxes.

Sammy Blackbear, an attorney, and two other tribe members were charged with similar counts of theft after a soft coup in 2001 where they withdrew over $45,000 in tribal funds and transferred over $400,000 in funds to the falsified new tribal organization (with authorization from the Henry Clayton, the non-recognized Nato Indian nation's self-described "residing judge of the First Federal District Court"), attempted to get $250,000 at a second branch, and attempted to withdraw $385,000 from another bank. In 2005, Sammy Blackbear pleaded guilty to the misuse of $1000 in tribal funds.

After the Bear chaos, the tribe filed for the record to be reopened in January 2004, but the NRC chose not to intervene, stating the "concerns are very serious, but they belong in another forum, not an NRC licensing proceeding."

Despite the indictments, the Salt Lake Tribune described the tribe as being "in meltdown" by late 2006, with their Salt Lake development office locked and mail piling up. Vice Chairman Lori Bear, Lawrence Bear's daughter, resigned in August stating she was "tired of working with a 'king' and forced to sign blank checks", and the tribe voted to shut down the executive committee. The band failed to reach a quorum, which meant Leon Bear was still the leader, and he described himself as "chief for life at this point" to Reuters. Noting the lack of government, the BIA said they may step in.

=== Further opposition ===
Other groups that opposed it included Public Citizen, who noted heavy lobbying from PFS through McClure, Gerard & Neuenschwander, led in part by former Idaho Senator James A. McClure, as well as lobbying by the PFS corporations and other connected industry associations, identifying $14.4 million in direct lobbying expenses and $22.5 million in related associations in an 18-month period starting January 1999. They also identified nearly $5 million in campaign contributions from the groups during the same time period. The Sierra Club also opposed it.

In October 2000, Bonnie Raitt and the Indigo Girls held a concert in Salt Lake City to raise awareness to the project. The Indigo Girls, Ani DiFranco, Winona LaDuke, James Cromwell, Rep. Dennis Kucinich, Public Interest Research Group's Navin Nayak, and Margene Bullcreek also held a press briefing in Washington DC on July 25, 2005.

Aside from the Goshutes in Utah, other Utah residents and NRC acknowledged the disproportionate effects of US nuclear weapon testing on Utah residents (see Downwinders), especially after the intense fallout from the Upshot-Knothole Harry test, later nicknamed "Dirty Harry". This fallout led to substantial increases in cancer rates of southern Utah residents and even a Hollywood film crew making The Conqueror near St. George, Utah. John Wayne's lung cancer in 1964 and 1979 stomach cancer and death are often linked to the Dirty Harry test; at least 91 of 220 people on the set were diagnosed or died from cancer, including Susan Hayward, Pedro Armendáriz, and Dick Powell. Residents also linked the Tooele County area to other waste projects and incidents such as the Dugway sheep incident, where the accidental release of VX gas in Skull Valley killed 6000 sheep, which were buried on the Skull Valley Band's land with a financial settlement.

Bayley Lopez of Nuclear Age Peace Foundation called the waste storage on Indian lands proposals "a form of economic racism akin to bribery".

== Nuclear Regulatory Commission application ==
The project application was initially submitted to the Nuclear Regulatory Commission in 1997 by PFS's Chairman of the Board John D. Parkyn. The initial application stated there were zero facilities within a ten-mile radius; by 2002, applications indicated the Goshute village, two ranches, and the Tekoi solid fuel rocket testing facility were noted as being within five miles. By 2002, however, Tekoi was no longer in operation. Shaw Pittman represented the tribe to the NRC.

The Department of the Interior (DOI), Bureau of Indian Affairs, and Bureau of Land Management blocked parts of the plan- for instance, DOI denied the right-of-way required for transportation to the project because it was against the public interest. The Interior Department's objections were struck down in court as "arbitrary and capricious" in 2010.

=== Utah laws and objections ===
Six parties, including the State of Utah filed initial objections to the plan in 1997. Utah filed 68 out of the 160 total contentions. Utah contended that NRC does not have jurisdiction via the Nuclear Waste Policy Act of 1982 (NWPA), since it was for an intermediate offsite spent fuel storage facility (ISFSI), which was not explicitly discussed. This was rejected in 1998, siding with both NRC and PFS's arguments that precise enumeration was not needed. Utah filed a similar complaint in 2002, which was rejected by the commission two months later.

By 2000, however, the Tooele County was on board with PFS; the commissioners, Teryl Hunsaker and Gary Griffith, spoke about the economic boost to the county. Gov Leavitt stated the county had been bought off. Griffith, however, lost his commission seat later that year to a critic of PFS, Gene White.

Beginning in 2001, Utah also passed a series of laws to require a $5 million nonrefundable application fee, restrict transportation of nuclear waste, add a 75% tax on it, requiring $150 billion in upfront fees, and similar maneuvers. Utah also sued PFS for concerns including the Yucca Mountain storage project, risks from stray bombs dropped at the nearby Utah Test and Training Range, credible risk of an aviation crash and risks of accidents at the nearby Tekoi rocket facility. Of Utah's objections, Sue Martin of PFS said "it seems like this is a blatant attempt to divert the court's attention", and Deseret News's editorial page editor Jay Evensen wrote editorial stating that while Leavitt and 80% of Utahns stand against the project, it might lead to a situation like the WTO riots in Seattle with "bullets and tear gas", and called the laws passed by Utah as "more like blackmail than a simple protest", and that Utah doesn't want outside protesters coming in. Advocates, however, pointed to the 2000-2001 California rolling power blackouts as rationale for the continued need of nuclear power. By the end of 2002 it was clear Enron's market manipulation was a key factor, and CEO Kenneth Lay was convicted on multiple charges in 2006 related to the events.

In December 2001, after the 9/11 attacks, the state of Utah filed contention RR, "Suicide Mission Terrorism and Sabotage". The commissioners invited parties to comment on the issue in February 2002, specifically asking "What is an agency's responsibility under NEPA to consider intentional malevolent acts, such as those directed at the United States on September 11, 2001? The parties should cite all relevant cases, legislative history or regulatory analysis."

=== Military aviation crashes ===
In 2003 NRC's Atomic Safety and Licensing Board's administrative judges posted a 222-page "partial initial decision" regarding "credible accidents", primarily from a military aircraft accident, discussing the probability of a hypothetical F-16 crash at the site. Topics such as nose angle, lookdown angle, and zoom climbs were evaluated. The Skull Valley corridor was used for approximately 7000 sorties per year during training (day and night, as low as 100 feet (30 m) above ground level). NRC specifically didn't evaluate intentional terrorist aircraft crashes, a new issue at the time, nor did they evaluate the damage that might occur to the nuclear casks- instead, they simply discussed the probability of a crash. The report remarked that it was the 55th decision related to the PFS application, that the transcript of the topic's 2002 hearings was 11,000 pages, 475 exhibits were shown, and the post-trial briefs covered another 2200 pages.

The metric adopted was a one in one million (1*10^-6) probability of an aviation accident occurring per year. PFS attempted to add a fifth factor to the standard NUREG-0800 3.5.1.6-3 four-factor airway calculation, further reducing the odds by the likelihood that a pilot could recognize and steer away from a dangerous crash site, initially discussed as being an 85.5% reduction. Ultimately NRC calculated a higher probability above four in one million (4.29*10^-6), compared with PFS's calculation of 2*10^-8. The possibility of a plane crash was considered credible (needing to be evaluated) rather than incredible (so unlikely that it does not need to be evaluated) as PFS claimed. NRC staff also calculated the probability of jettisoned ordnance (before or during an aircraft emergency) to be 2.11*10^-7. While outside the metric, it is an added factor to the overall risk, so it was considered worthy of consideration. NRC ruled against PFS for this, though PFS's Scott Northard was still optimistic about the project.

PFS and NRC's staff appealed the commission's ruling a few weeks later. The board reevaluated of the crash likelihood and factored in only crashes that would result in breaching the dry cask, including delving into minutae like ductility ratios of buildings versus casks. NRC ruled in PFS's favor, then again in PFS's favor during an appeal from Utah in 2005, though with one of the three commissioners, Gregory Jaczko, dissenting. NRC accepted PFS's calculations of 0.74*10^-6 for a military plane crash resulting in a cask failure. Several objections noted Utah had "waived the right" to arguments because they failed to bring them up in a timely manner (such as the 15 previous hearings). Another ruling referred to Utah's continued objection ('Contention UU') as a "thinly-supported new contention".

=== Final ruling on Utah concerns and NRC approval ===
Ultimately, Utah's concerns (125 specific contentions) were struck down in court, finding the state had overstated their case, and it was ruled in PFS's favor. The state laws were struck down in 2002 over federal preemption, and it was upheld in a 2004 Tenth Circuit appeals court. By 2003 the NRC application process was still ongoing. Representative Rob Bishop, along with Cannon and Matheson, sponsored a successful amendment (Amendment 383) to the 2006 National Defense Authorization Act to create the Cedar Mountain Wilderness (over 100,000 acres (40,000 ha)) and a moratorium on Bureau of Land Management on related land use planning. These actions were specifically to block a proposed rail spur that would have delivered casks to the PFS site, which would have crossed or impacted eight historic sites: the Hastings Cutoff, US Route 40, Victory Highway ("old" and "new"), a Western Union telegraph line, the Western Pacific Railroad, and two roads. This was part of a Gov. Leavitt strategy of putting a "land moat" around Skull Valley.

Since the rail spur was blocked through law and BIA Chad Calbert's Record of Decision (ROD), and BLM wasn't allowed to sign a MOA due to the moratorium, the Advisory Council on Historic Preservation withdrew, as all concerns over the National Historic Preservation Act were rendered moot. Southern Company and Xcel Energy backed out of PFS by December 2005; Xcel had been the majority shareholder. Florida Power & Light backed out a week later, and the remaining utilities stopped funding PFS.

This withdrawal also allowed the full approval for the PFS project on February 21, 2006, as Materials License number SNM-2513, titled "License For Independent Storage of Spent Nuclear Fuel and High-Level Radioactive Waste", subject to DOI approval. DOI's James Cason formally rejected the project on September 6, 2006, in a record of decision, usurping the lower BIA's review. The rail line spur was also denied by DOI. With the rejection of the lease, Orrin Hatch said "We just wanted to put a spike right through the heart of this project and this does it".

The two RODs were described as "curious documents", clearly "based more heavily in politics than "reasoned decisionmaking".

In July 2007, Skull Valley Band and PFS filed a lawsuit against DOI for blocking the plan through the Administrative Procedure Act. The lawsuit indicated the PFS contract was worth $200,000 per year in the construction phase, $1 million per year after opening, plus profit sharing. Since DOI's objection caused the cancellation, the suit was asking for damages as well as overturning their decision. The case was decided in July 2010, overturning both the Calvert and Cason decisions, with the court explaining that their decision was "arbitrary and capricious" and an abuse of discretion. For instance, the environmental impact statement, filed well before 2001, did not include discussion of terrorist attacks like were seen in the 9/11 attacks, leading the judicial opinion to state "the DOI had an obligation to prepare an adequate [environmental impact statement", especially since the information "generally appears to be readily obtainable". While the Tribe and PFS had sent multiple letters offering to furnish more information to no avail, part of the denial was for lack of information. The ruling meant DOI was required to reconsider the application. Sen. Hatch and Utah's congressional delegation criticized the reopening, with Hatch calling it "a lawyer-employment plan funded by the last holdout member of PFS".

In March 2006 PFS's Parkyn celebrated the appeal, stating "Yes, there is hope for our future" to applause at an industry forum. TIME magazine stated the tribe was slated to get $100 million over 45 years from the project, but neither PFS's Sue Martin nor the band's Leon Bear would confirm that. Margene Bullcreek said she had still not seen the contract.

=== Project cancellation ===
The Blue Ribbon Commission on America's Nuclear Future was created by presidential memorandum in 2010 and a report was issued in December 2012, discussing nuclear waste especially after the termination of the Yucca Mountain project. Changes were also made to the Waste Confidence Rule in 2010, requiring nuclear power plant operators and others to have confidence in the ability to dispose of spent nuclear fuel. Since a private temporary storage site would not cause title to the SNF to be assumed by DOE until being taken to a permanent site, and with no permanent site even in a planning state, the risk of a private facility is substantially higher. In 2010-2011 the status of the project was described as "uncertain".

PFS withdrew their application on December 20, 2012, which was signed by PFS's Chairman of the Board Robert M. Palmberg. It was estimated that $70 million had been spent on the project's application and legal by then.

In an October 2013 letter acknowledging a Fiscal Year 2013 exemption from annual license fees on the unused storage license, Palmberg indicated that PFS would like to keep their license open if the 2014 fee exemption was allowed. A formal request for withdrawal of termination was made in 2014, apparently after the exemptions were granted.

PFS, pursuant to program applications in 1996, 2001, and 2006, was required to make biannual NRC Quality Assurance Program filings. Those were made in 2017

== Sovereignty, economic justice, and communication scholarship ==
Decisions surrounding nuclear waste siting by the tribes, especially Mescalaro and Goshutes, brought up issues of tribal sovereignty, economic exploitation, forcing Western democracy on tribes, and cultural imperialism. Expecting a tribe to 'volunteer' to handle the waste was described as a "modern Hobson's choice". Further, the relative wealth of the Mescalero compared to the Skull Valley band raised the question if consent could be freely given by the band. Targeting Skull Valley for waste can be seen as part of an ongoing failure of exploitation and environmental justice. On the other hand, the band spent years learning about the risks, the Mescaleros were able to decline, which could make second-guessing the band's decision as racism and paternalism.

Opposition to the project "dealt heavily with the rhetoric of death", such as Leavitt's "over my dead body" comment and Orrin Hatch stating it was "dead on arrival". Other opposition tended to focus on "death" and "cancer" when discussing risks. In a journal article described elsewhere as "the first comprehensive synthesis of the narratives employed by proponents of a nuclear site", Jennifer A. Peeples described the communication dynamics in charge of agents, agency, and purpose. For instance, she explained the pro-PFS tribal group (Larry Bear) as fitting a narrative frame of self-determinism, "The Goshutes (agent) have made an educated decision (agency) about this facility and we feel it is in our best interest to go forward with the project. It benefits ourselves and the nation (purpose). Those who oppose us do so out of ignorance and prejudice." The PFS argument was given in a dispassionate, pragmatic, and scientific tone; even references to the fuel storage facility rarely mentioned the humans working there. Proponents in the community framed their arguments in terms of morality, equity, and economic justice (financial restitution through the PFS money) and emotional attacks against opponents, or constructing rationale why opponents argued against the project, including blaming the opponents of racism. Additionally, the perception and stigma of nuclear waste combines to reduce institutional trust and promote a NIMBY attitude, leading to the siting of locally unwanted land uses in minority communities with less time or resources to organize against it. Values and cost assigned to materials are culturally dependent and open to interpretation. Understandings and beliefs about the dangers of radiation, for example, are culturally dependent, with some tribes (such as the Paiutes) assigning a heavy spiritual cost to radioactivity. Grassroots activism in such communities is more similar to civil rights movements than environmental movements.

Peeples stated that the combination of these three disparate approaches was "particularly problematic" based on the issue. While the Goshutes tried to establish trust in their decisionmaking abilities, the PFS argument excluded them from the narrative, and the community advocates eroded trust by referencing the downwinder damage and by eroding the motives of politicians and local opponents, while the opponents "won" through use of repetition more than accuracy. Tracylee Clarke also described the intra-tribe dynamic that led to lack of voice and access, shaping of the tribe's identity through the distorted narrative of the Larry Bear group.

Weiss also argues that the rhetoric strategies and polarization makes social constructionism very applicable to the rhetorical themes and tactics. The harsh environment shaped much of the Goshute tribal identity, lacking sufficient resources to allow for a powerful central rule or sense of community. Arguments, or claims-making, is used to argue a viewpoint to gain the moral high ground. Common tactics in the dispute was frame and reframe an opposing point of view and react to that framing, and to vilify the opposition by examining motives and by exaggerating imperfections. Proponents gave rhetorical trust to scientists and tribal leadership, while distrusting the state of Utah and its actors (such as Gov. Leavitt). Expert proponents described their years of experience and awards won (such as six Nobel laureates who supported the project) to impress "with credentials rather than data".

Proponents made arguments against Utah that were framed in political motivations, such as indicating that Gov. Leavitt's concern was with reelection, not the project itself. This was reinforced by ennobling Leon Bear as having the best interests of the tribe at heart. Aligning proponents with ennobled scientists legitimizes their arguments. In contrast, opponents vilified Leon Bear, disputing the legitimacy of his leadership and claiming corruption, such as embezzlement and having bribed tribe members. Opponents also used charges of racism, especially in terms of environmental justice and environmental racism. Proponents, especially Leon Bear, used these same charges to state the band is not being allowed to profit from this storage, perpetuating racism through paternalism. Proponents also argued that Leavitt was racist, which then makes any decisions by him tainted, making the proponents portray themselves as standing against racism.

The framework of environmental justice and environmental racism is argued as too simplistic or part of a "oversimplified dichotomy" in cases like this, which also involve procedural justice, restorative justice, tribal identity politics, various definitions of sovereignty, self-determination, a spectrum of assimilation versus traditionalism, and moral purity.]

== Policy legacy ==
The groundwork from PFS allowed NRC to produce a generic environmental impact statement (GEIS) in 2014, NUREG-1751, on siting ISFSIs and dry cask transfer systems (DTS, not needing a spent fuel pool), including environmental justice impacts.

== See also ==
- Iosepa, Utah
- Clive, Utah
- Uranium mining and the Navajo people
- Three Mile Island accident (operated by GPU)
- Prairie Island Nuclear Power Plant (Xcel facility adjacent to Prairie Island Indian Community reservation)
- Black Mesa Peabody Coal controversy (Coal mining on Hopi Indian reservation)
- Kayenta Mine (Coal mining on Hopi Indian reservation)
- Four Corners Generating Station (Coal power plant on Hopi Indian reservation)
- Church Rock uranium mill spill (contaminated Navajo Nation land)
- Navajo Generating Station
- Basel Convention
