= Low, Utah =

Low
- Ghost town
- Location within Utah Location within the United States
- Coordinates: 40°47′08″N 112°56′26″W
- Country: United States
- State: Utah
- County: Tooele
- Established: 1880
- Abandoned: 1955
- Elevation: 4,600 ft (1,402 m)
- GNIS feature ID: 1437626

Low is a ghost town in northern Tooele County, Utah, United States.

Low was established in 1880 as a construction and maintenance camp on a siding of the Western Pacific Railroad. Its name may have derived from its location on a low pass between the Cedar Mountains to the south, and the Grassy Mountains to the north. Local water was unavailable so the camp was abandoned in 1955. A scattering of ruins remain. The Low Flight Strip is an abandoned military airfield located approximately 13 miles (21 km) west of Low.

Interstate 80 runs west of Low, and Exit 62 is known as the "Low Interchange".

The "Low Transportation Corridor" or "Low Rail Corridor" both refer to a proposed rail line to carry spent nuclear fuel from the Union Pacific mainline at the junction of Interstate 80 near the Low Interchange, to the Skull Valley Indian Reservation, across 1,593 acres (645 ha) of Bureau of Land Management land within the Skull Valley.
