= Utah State Route 196 =

State highway in Utah, United States

State Route 196

Route information
- Maintained by UDOT
- Length: 36.922 mi (59.420 km)
- Existed: 1998–present

Major junctions
- South end: SR-199 in Dugway
- North end: I-80 in Rowley Junction

Location
- Country: United States
- State: Utah

Highway system
- Utah State Highway System; Interstate; US; State; Minor; Scenic
← SR-194	→ SR-198

State Route 196 is a north-south state highway located entirely in Tooele County, Utah that begins at SR-199 and ends at I-80. It passes through Skull Valley, and was added to the state highway system in 1998 to prevent the Skull Valley Band of Goshute Indians from using their reservation to store nuclear waste.

== Route description ==
SR-196 begins at the junction with SR-199 near the control gate at Dugway Proving Ground. The route travels north through the Skull Valley Indian Reservation and past the ghost town of Iosepa; also, mostly the east side of Skull Valley, at the west foothills of the Stansbury Mountains. The route ends at the junction with I-80 at the Rowley Junction interchange.

== History ==
Skull Valley Road, then an unimproved dirt trail, was part of the Lincoln Highway from its creation in 1913 until about 1920, when an improved gravel road over Johnson Pass (present SR-199) was built with the help of a donation from Carl G. Fisher. By the 1950s, Tooele County had constructed a paved county road through the valley. In the early 1990s, the Skull Valley Band of Goshute Indians began planning a nuclear waste storage facility in Skull Valley. At the urging of Governor Mike Leavitt, the Utah Transportation Commission added the road to the state highway system in January 1998 as SR-196, and in February the state legislature concurred and added the new route to the highway code. Signs were posted in March prohibiting transport of high-level nuclear waste on the new state highway except by permit. The next year, the commission designated two "statewide public safety interest highways" - State Routes 900 and 901 - each consisting of several low-quality Bureau of Land Management and county-maintained roadways branching off I-80 and SR-196, respectively. Unlike a typical state highway, the roads were not to be improved to higher standards; the purpose of the designation was to prevent construction of a waste-carrying rail line branching off the Union Pacific Railroad's Shafter Subdivision (ex-Western Pacific Railroad), which would cross these roads.

== Major intersections ==
The entire route is in Tooele County.

Location	mi	km	Destinations	Notes
Dugway Proving Ground	0.000	0.000	SR-199	Southern terminus
Rowley Junction	36.828	59.269	I-80 – Wendover, Salt Lake City	Northern terminus; I-80 exit 77
1.000 mi = 1.609 km; 1.000 km = 0.621 mi
