= Low Flight Strip =

Low Flight Strip
- Tooele County, near Low, Utah

Site information
- Type: AAF Emergency Landing Airfield
- Controlled by: United States Army Air Forces

Location
- Coordinates: 40°47′23″N 113°11′51″W

Site history
- Built: 1942
- In use: 1942–1945

Low Flight Strip is an abandoned military airfield located approximately 13 miles (21 km) west of the ghost town of Low, Utah.

== History ==
This was one of the many Flight Strips which were built by the USAAF during World War II for the emergency use of military aircraft. Used by Wendover Army Airfield as an Axillary operating P-47 Thunderbolts and B-29 Superfortresses for the 509th Composite Group.

The Low Flight Strip constructed in 1943 by Second Air Force. The strip consisted of a 7,130 foot paved runway, with a total graded length of 9,130 feet, consisting of single north–south runway, which was built on top of a dirt road which led north from US Highway 40.

The paved runway surface had apparently been extended at some point after the runway's initial construction, as the length of the runway pavement is 9,300 feet in aerial imagery of the site. There is also what appears to be a small square paved ramp area along the west side of the northern end of the runway; however there are no buildings at the site.

It was used by the United States Air Force as an auxiliary field for the Hill AFB range until about 1965. It is not known whether the Low Flight Strip was ever reused as a civilian airfield. Today the airfield is abandoned, its hard surface deteriorating in the harsh, arid environment.
