= Aragonite Hazardous Waste Incinerator =

Hazardous waste incinerator in the state of Utah, United States

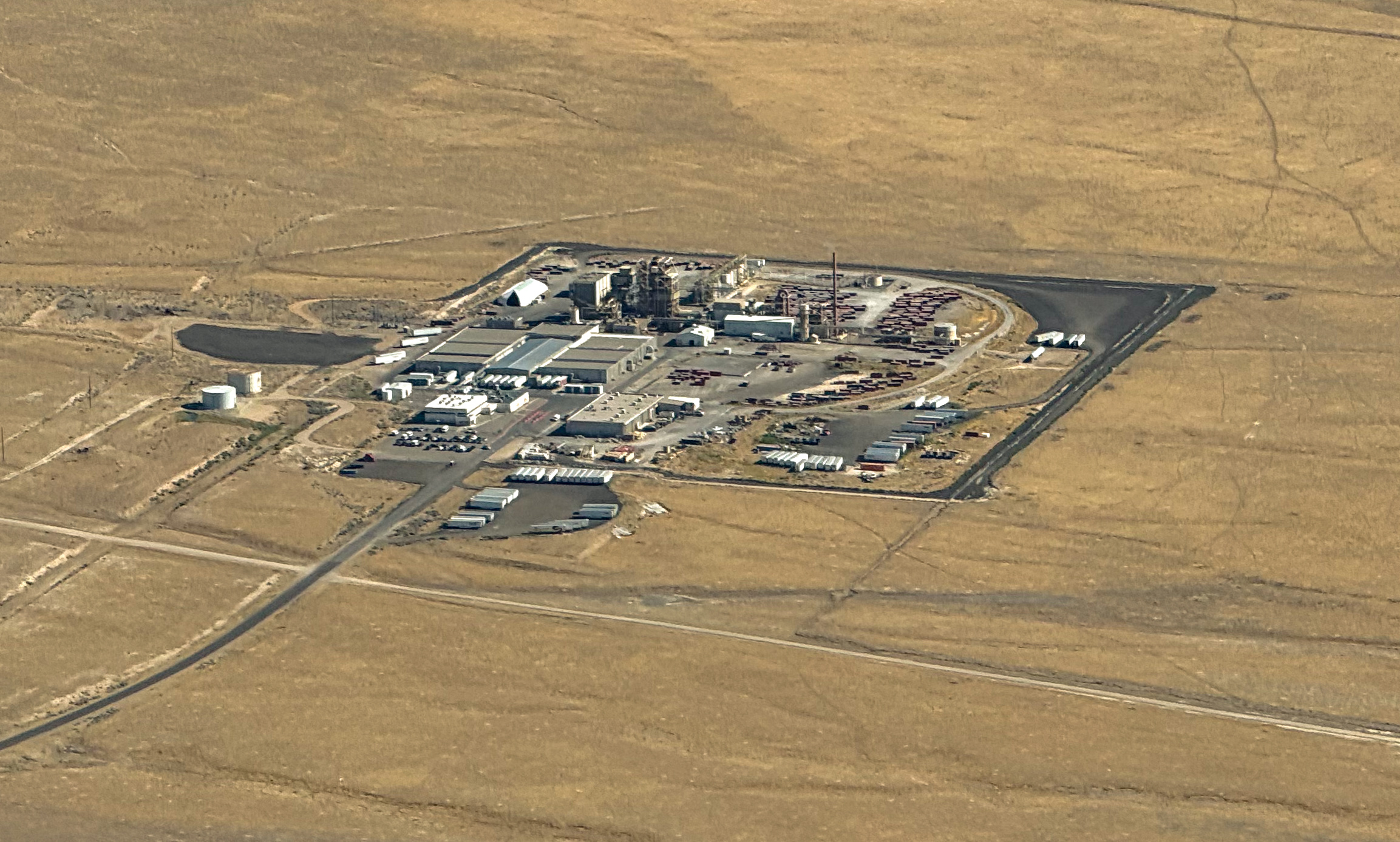
- Aerial photo of the incinerator facility
- Coordinates: 40°44′34″N 113°0′10″W

The Aragonite Hazardous Waste Incinerator is a waste disposal facility currently operated by Clean Harbors. It is located in Aragonite, Tooele County, Utah, United States, located in the western portion of the state.

== Site geography and early history ==
The Utah Test and Training Range lies to the west and the Dugway Proving Grounds lie to the southwest. Interstate 80, exit 56 provides access to Aragonite. The site lies northwest of the Cedar Mountains. The low Grassy Mountains lie to the north.

Aragonite lies along the Hastings Cutoff, a historical transmontane route taken by nineteenth-century pioneers. Aragonite was established in the early twentieth century for the mining of aragonite, though all mining operations in the area have ceased. A 1950s-era mining guide described a small townsite, but the area is now uninhabited and almost totally demolished.

The historical Aragonite site has been described as "an old mining town from the early 20th century that mined aragonite. This mine was only in operation for a few years but today [in 2009] the mineshafts are still open and a few bunkhouses remain, as well as an old truck."

== Waste disposal ==
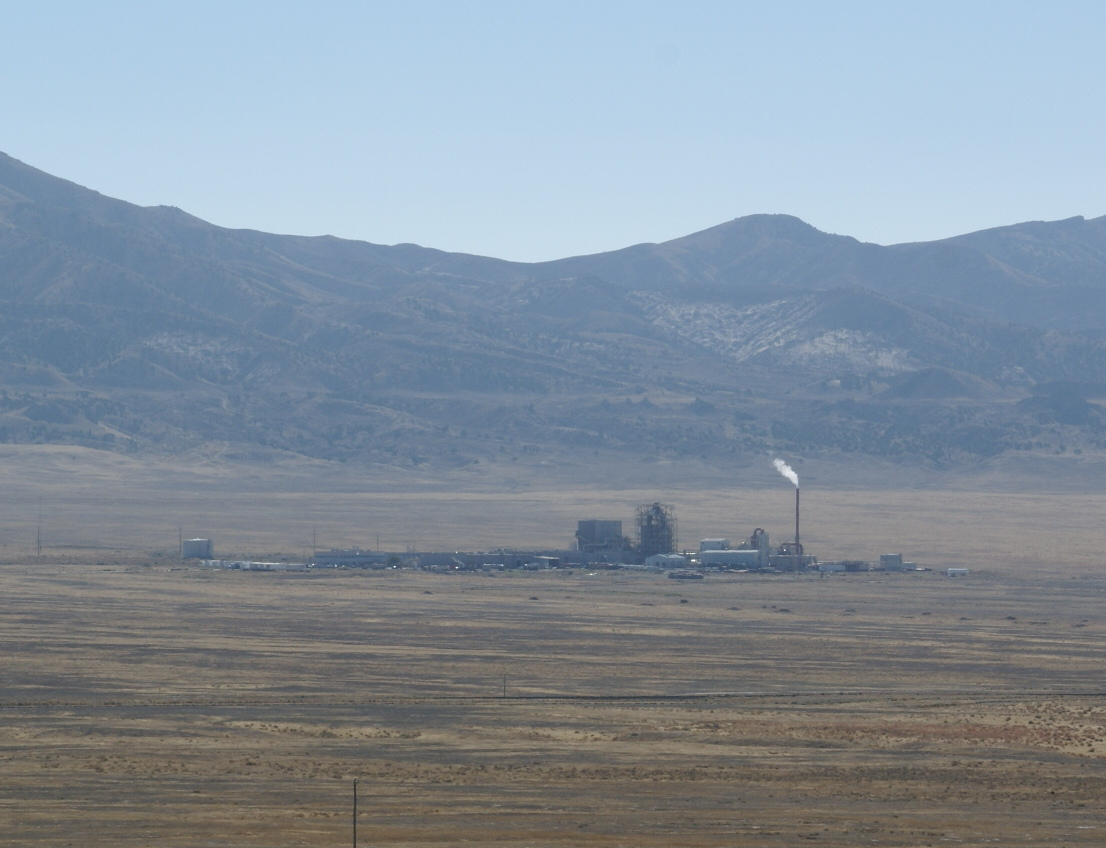
Aragonite Hazardous Waste Incineration facility on I-80, Aragonite Utah

Just east of the historical townsite is a large hazardous waste incineration facility. This facility was known as the Aptus Incinerator, and was built there in 1991 after Tooele County established the surrounding lands as the West Desert Hazardous Industries District.

According to the Provo Daily Herald, the Aptus incinerator at Aragonite was the first hazardous waste incinerator in Utah. In 1992, it had the capacity to burn 70,000 tons of waste per year, most of which came from out-of-state sources. The incinerator was, at times, operated by Westinghouse, Rollins, Laidlaw, and Safety-Kleen, and is now operated by Clean Harbors. In 2013, it was reported that Utah medical facilities were considering using the Aragonite disposal facility instead of the Stericycle facility, which is much closer to Salt Lake City.

The facility has been the subject of several penalties administered by the EPA. A 2009 Associated Press story reported on a settlement reached after 48 regulatory violations were uncovered, including some relating to fires at the facility. The Salt Lake City Tribune described the facility as an "alleged serial violator" in 2014, noting yearly fines for reporting errors, inventory discrepancies, improper storage, and inadvertent air pollutant releases.

In 2017, an armed man threatened to explode a bomb at the facility, and was shot dead by state highway patrol officers.
