= Cedar Mountains (Tooele County, Utah) =

Mountain in the American state of Utah

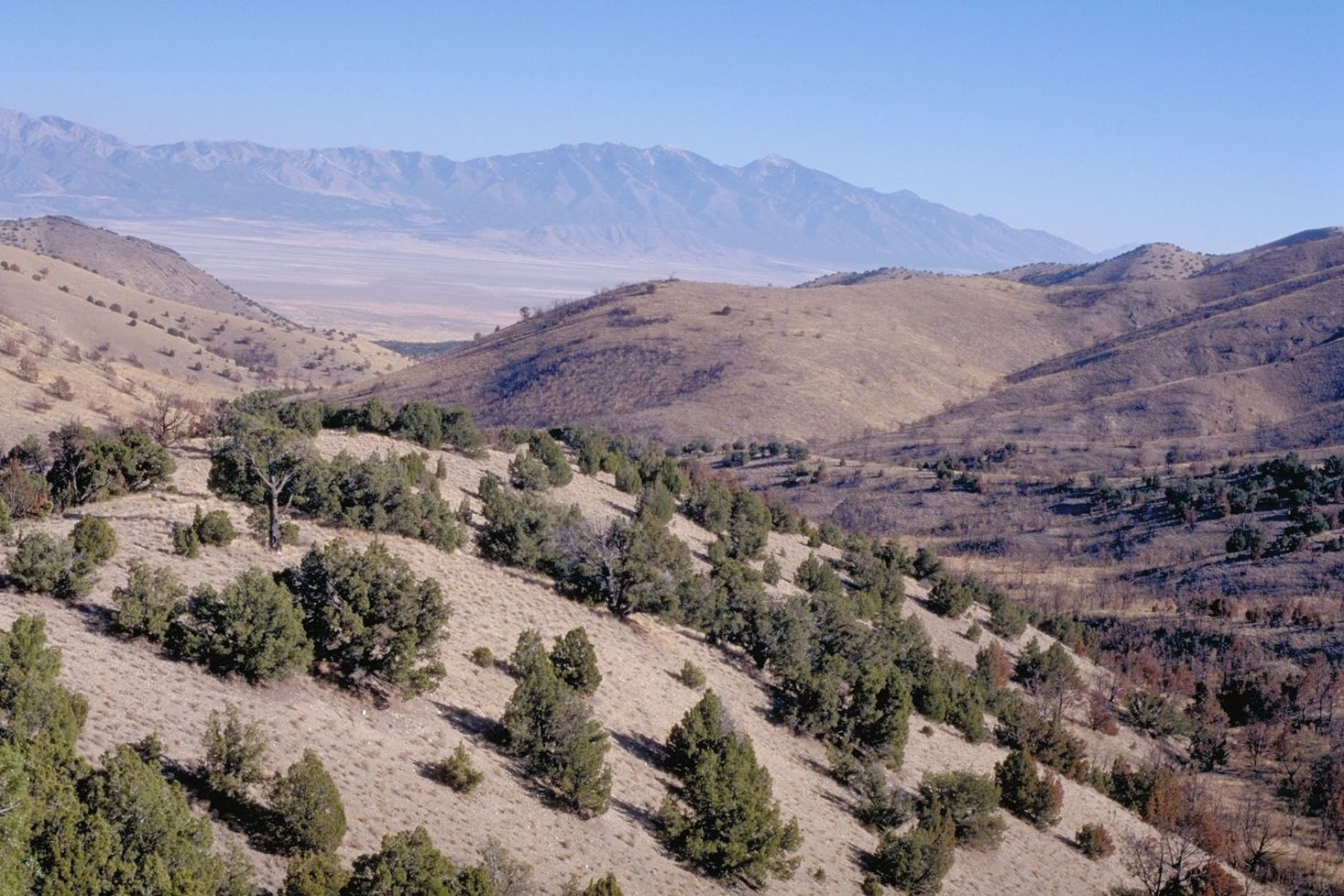
- View southeast of Skull Valley & Stansbury Mountains from Cedar Mountain Wilderness

Highest point
- Peak: Tabbys Peak
- Elevation: 6,921 ft (2,110 m)
- Coordinates: 40°27′48″N 112°59′15″W

Dimensions
- Length: 45 mi (72 km) N-S, (north 30-mi section)
- Width: 5 mi (8.0 km) (widest, 7-mi, SE trending for south 15-mi section)

Geography
- Location within Utah
- Country: United States
- State: Utah
- Regions: Great Basin Desert and Great Salt Lake Desert
- County: Tooele
- Communities: Dugway, Aragonite, Low and Delle
- Range coordinates: 40°33′49″N 112°58′53″W
- Borders on: Lakeside Mountains, Great Salt Lake, Skull Valley, Great Salt Lake Desert, Grassy Mountains and Paddle Valley

The Cedar Mountains of Tooele County, Utah, USA, are a 45-mile (72 km) long mountain range located in the county's east, bordering east sections of the Great Salt Lake Desert on the range's west and southwest flanks.

The range contains the Cedar Mountain Wilderness, and lies between Skull Valley on its east and southeast, and the Great Salt Lake Desert on its west and southwest.

== Description ==
The Cedar Mountains contain a 30-mi (48 km) due-north trending north section, and a 15-mi (24 km) southeast trending section. The range is only moderate elevation 6000+ ft in the north, 5000+ ft in the southeast, but contains numerous springs on all its foothills.

Three mountain passes dissect the range. Hastings Pass and North Cedar Loop Road access an extreme north region. Rydalch Pass and Canyon are 4 mi north of the southeast section region; Six Horse Pass is at the bisection point, with unimproved access roads from the west flank, at the east Great Salt Lake Desert saltflats.

=== Peaks and range center ===
The highpoint of the range is Tabbys Peak at 6,921 feet (2,110 m), adjacent north of Rydalch Pass. White Rock at 5,693 feet (1,735 m) is midpoint along the southeast mountain range section.

The midpoint of the entire range is near Quiney Spring on the range's west flank.

== Access ==
The north region of the Cedar Mountains can be accessed from Interstate 80 from Delle on the east, and Low and Aragonite on the west. For the north 30-mi section: from Aragonite, Hastings Pass Road accesses Hastings Pass; from Hastings Pass Road, Cedar Mountain Road follows the west perimeter foothills south to West Cedar Flats Road. South Valley Road from Skull Valley intersects after going over Rydalch Pass, Rydalch Canyon.

The south 15-mi section can be accessed from Dugway and south Skull Valley. Utah State Route 196 goes north from Dugway; S. Cedar Mountain Road follows the northeast foothills of the range, (Post Hollow Road exits west from Utah 196).

Lakeside Mountains, north Cedar Mountains, and north Skull Valley
