= Davis Knolls =

Desert hills in Skull Valley, Utah

The Davis Knolls (40°11′N 112°38′W) is a system of semi-arid desert hills, situated 9.5 nautical miles (17.6 km) southeast of Dugway, Utah in Skull Valley (Utah). It was extensively studied and mapped by the University of Utah in 1962, under the direction of James Harrill.

Geologically, the region consists of seven gravel outcroppings that all run North to South, with small valleys between them. These outcroppings have an average relief of between 200 and 600 feet. They are made up of basin and range fault blocks from the Oquirrh Range.

Wildlife includes wild pronghorns, mountain lions, coyotes, rattle snakes, and a variety of lesser mammals. The knolls are home to Utah's largest herd of wild horses. Vegetation varies based on elevation, and includes a variety of sage species, cacti, milkweed, and a wide variety of wildflowers.

The region has many fossils and an extensive geologic history.

The region is used by the Ensign Ranch, the Hatch Ranch, and the Bertoch Ranch as wintering grounds for their cattle.
