= Skull Valley Indian Reservation =

Native American reservation in Tooele County, Utah, United States

Coordinates: 40°24′N 112°43′W

Skull Valley Band of Goshute Indians of Utah
Wepayuttax (Gosiute dialect)

Total population
- 127 enrolled citizens

Regions with significant populations
- United States(Utah)

Languages
- Shoshoni-Gosiute dialect, English

Religion
- Native American Church, The Church of Jesus Christ of Latter-day Saints

Related ethnic groups
- other Western Shoshone peoples, Ute people

The Skull Valley Indian Reservation (Gosiute dialect: Wepayuttax) is located in Tooele County, Utah, United States, approximately 45 miles (72 km) southwest of Salt Lake City. It is controlled by the Skull Valley Band of Goshute Indians of Utah, a federally recognized tribe of Goshute people. They have 127 enrolled citizens.

== Government ==
The tribe is headquartered in Tooele, Utah, and is governed by a three-person executive committee.

A population of 31 persons resided on its territory as of the 2000 census. Tribal citizenship is 127.

== Landbase ==
Location of Skull Valley Reservation

The reservation comprises 28.187 square miles (73.00 km^{2}) of land in east central Tooele County, adjacent to the southwest side of the Wasatch-Cache National Forest in the Stansbury Mountains. The reservation lies in the south of Skull Valley, with another range, the Cedar Mountains bordering west. Resident and previous chairman Leon Bear described it as their "beautiful wasteland".

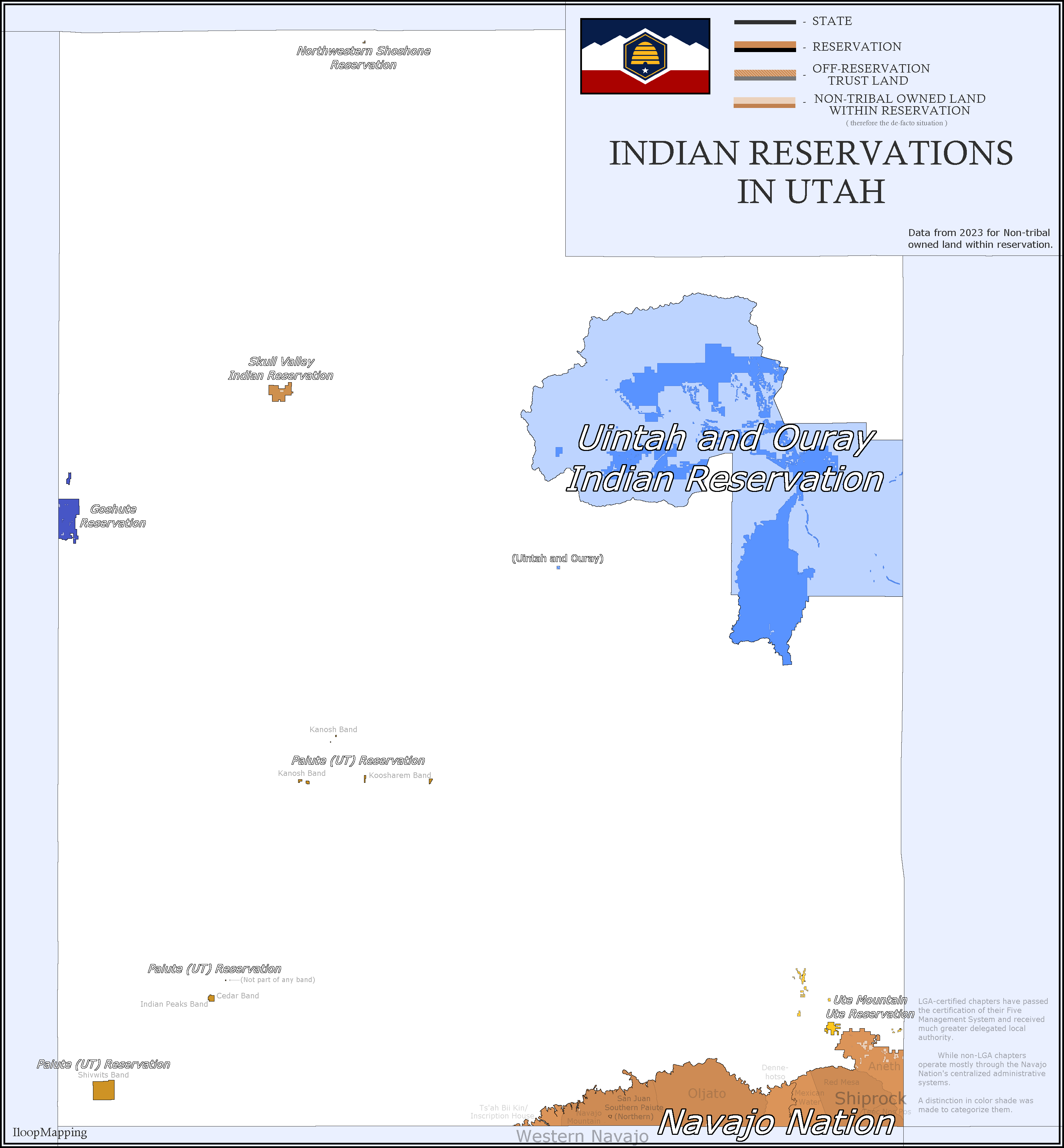
Map of the Skull Valley Reservation and neighboring reservations (In orange).

== History ==
Archeological evidence indicates various groups inhabited the land in and around the Skull Valley reservation from about 11,000 years before present at the earliest. Ancestors of the later Goshute, Shoshone, Paiute and Ute peoples are believed to have occupied the area by roughly 1200-1300 CE.

The tribe's first contact with Europeans was Spanish missionaries beginning in 1776 (the Dominguez-Escalante expedition, followed by fur trappers and explorers such as Jedediah Smith. Spanish slave traders began abducting Indigenous women in the 1830s, but regular contact didn't occur until Mormon settlers arrived in 1847. The white settlers called them "diggers" and described as "the most miserable looking set human beings ... ever beheld". Mark Twain remembered them as "the wretchedest type of mankind ... a people whose only shelter is a rag cast on a bush to keep off a portion of the snow, and yet who inhabit one of the most rocky, wintry, repulsive wastes that our country or any other can exhibit." Mormons brought smallpox and measles, and by 1849 Mormons entered the Tooele Valley, establishing a settlement. Young requested the US government relocate all Native Americans in the Utah Territory to a reservation "where white men do not dwell." The city of Tooele had more than 600 people by 1853. The Mormons encroached on the most valuable Goshute land near streams and canyons, forcing them into even more desolate places. Goshute raids and Mormon reprisals resulted in deaths.

In 1860 the Pony Express cut through Goshute land, placing at least 20 stations on it. Goshutes raided, stole supplies, and occasionally killed European-Americans during this era. U.S. military was called to defend the Pony Express, and the Goshute war lasted from 1860 to 1863, killing at least 100 Goshutes and 16 White settlers. On October 12, 1863, the Goshute band first signed a treaty with the U.S. federal government but did not surrender their territory. The US government again tried to relocate the tribe to the Uintah-Ouray Reservation, but the Goshutes refused. US leadership tried yet again, sending John Wesley Powell and George W. Ingalls to "induce" Goshutes into moving to a reservation. They refused. Instead, they were simply ignored and neglected, and were in fact listed as living on the reservation even though that wasn't the case. Their population numbers simply disappeared after an 1895 report.

President William Taft signed Executive Order 1539 in 1912, to establish an 80 acres (32 ha) reservation in Skull Valley, which Woodrow Wilson expanded to approximately 18,000 acres (7,300 ha) in 1917 (Executive Order 2699) and 1918 (executive order 2809). Still, BIA (Bureau of Indian Affairs) attempted to move the Skull Valley band to the Deep Creek reservation in efforts from 1936 to 1942.

=== Bear administrations ===
The tribal chairman was Lawrence Bear until 1995, and his nephew, Leon D. Bear, served as secretary for some time in the early 1990s. Leon Bear was elected as chair in November 1995 and again in November 2000. The tribe's leadership (and secondary leadership through a soft coup) was indicted with various fraud charges, primarily stemming from Leon Bear's cronyism misappropriation of Private Fuel Storage funds. Leon Bear pleaded guilty to lesser charges and was required to pay $31,000 to the tribe account and $13,000 in federal taxes, and was given three years' probation. Lawrence Bear was again the tribal chairman in 2007.

Sammy Blackbear, an attorney, and two other tribe members were charged with similar counts of theft after a soft coup in 2001 where they withdrew over $45,000 in tribal funds and transferred over $400,000 in funds to the falsified new tribal organization (with authorization from the Henry Clayton, the non-recognized Nato Indian nation's self-described "residing judge of the First Federal District Court"), attempted to get $250,000 at a second branch, and attempted to withdraw $385,000 from another bank. In 2005, Sammy Blackbear pleaded guilty to the misuse of $1000 in tribal funds.

After the Private Fuel Storage cancellation and criminal indictments, the Salt Lake Tribune described the tribe as being "in meltdown" by late 2006, with their Salt Lake development office locked and mail piling up. Vice Chairman Lori Bear, Lawrence Bear's daughter, resigned in August stating she was "tired of working with a 'king' and forced to sign blank checks", and the tribe voted to shut down the executive committee. The band failed to reach a quorum, which meant Leon Bear was still the leader, and he described himself as "chief for life at this point" to Reuters. Noting the lack of government, the BIA said they may step in.

Lawrence Bear died in June 2010 while the chairman; in 2011 his daughter, Lori Bear Skiby, was elected the chairwoman. Lori Bear established a formal federal court system in March 2013.

Leon Bear's father, Richard Bear, served as chairman at some point previous to 2002.

=== Spent nuclear fuel storage ===
As part of the Nuclear Waste Policy Act of 1982 and the 1987 amendment, the Skull Valley band applied for grants that were funded by 1990 and on. The first round of grants, approximately $100,000, funded the band executive committee's travel to Sacramento, California's Rancho Seco nuclear plant, Washington state's Hanford Site, Florida Power & Light nuclear facilities, and Virginia's Surry Nuclear Power Plant. The second phase of grants, approximately $200,000, sent the committee to Japan's Fugen nuclear plant and Tōkai reprocessing facility, France's La Hague reprocessing facility, UK's Sellafield power/reprocessing/storage facility, and Sweden's Clab storage facility.

== Environmental issues ==
There were records of a flood in 1878, and tribe members recalled large flood events in the 1930s, 1950s, and 1970s. In Fall 2013, a few weeks after the Patch Springs Fire, an intense rainstorm hit the area, causing flooding and mudflows estimated at 3,000 cubic feet (85 m^{3}). The BIA's Burned Area Emergency Response worked on emergency stabilization efforts with Jersey barriers and sandbags. Several flood events occurred almost a year later precipitation around 2 inches (51 mm) per hour, with flows estimated as high as 15,000 cubic feet (420 m^{3}). The Jersey barriers were overtopped by the mudflow and the potable water system was damaged. Further stabilization took place, and grass was seeded on 6,500 acres (2,600 ha) of BLM land above the flood site.

=== Proximity issues ===
With the exception of the west side of the reservation, the immediately surrounding areas have been used as a hazardous waste landfill, a nerve gas storage facility that treats some of the most hazardous man-made chemicals, two incinerators for hazardous waste, a magnesium plant that contributes significant amounts of chlorine gas, and the Intermountain Power Project that releases airborne toxic chemicals. Additionally, the U.S. government has tested biological weapons adjacent to Skull Valley.

While acknowledging that nuclear waste sites, incinerators, and other toxic landfills have provided economic benefits to the area, scholar Randel D. Hanson asserts that this industrial use of land in proximity to the reservation amounts to environmental racism, arguing that the proximity are especially concerning because children make up more than 30% of the tribe. Hanson connects the industrial uses in the region to a broader history of environmental justice issues have plagued the Goshute Band dating back to at least the 1840s when Mormon settlers would expel lepers to the area in which they lived.

The Tekoi balefill was approved in 2004.

=== Dugway Proving Ground ===
The United States Army tests the extremely toxic VX nerve agent at their Dugway Proving Ground facility located in the area immediately surrounding the Skull Valley Indian Reservation. The April 12, 1968 Dugway sheep incident, in which 6,000 sheep belonging to Skull Valley Goshute died after exposure to the deadly VX agent being tested at the Proving Ground, occurred on the Reservation. The VX agent operates by inhibiting the body's use of the enzyme cholinesterase, an important controller of nerve function, which in turn prevents the affected person or animal from controlling their bodies leading quickly to death by asphyxiation.

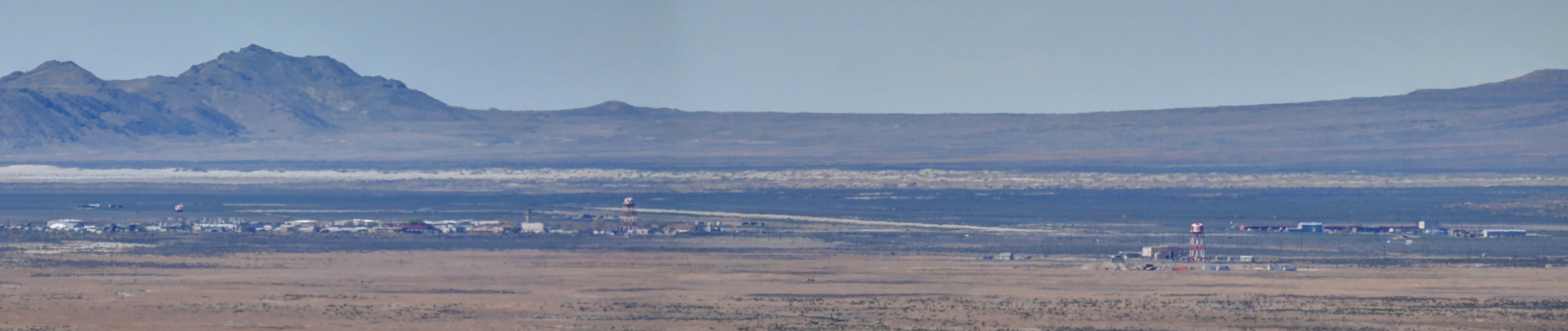
A panoramic view of the nearby Dugway Proving Ground where VX1 gas and other dangerous chemicals are tested by the U.S. Military, April 2015.

The event occurred during a routine test of a spraying system attached to an F-4 Jet. After successfully hitting the targets at low elevation with 80% of the loaded agent, the plane climbed up to 1,500 feet (460 m) as the remaining agent leaked out of the tanks. It began to rain and snow shortly afterwards, and it is assumed that the precipitation contained the agent, and that when sheep licked up the water and snow they began to show the symptoms of VX poisoning.

The Army has never admitted fault in this incident, though a 1970 report by researchers from the Edgewood Arsenal indicates that the evidence of nerve gas was incontrovertible. Due to the presence of thousands of sheep carcasses contaminated with the toxic agent, residents of the reservation have been unable to maintain stock on the land since, negatively effecting the economic viability of the reservation's rangeland. It is possible that this has contributed to the tribe's tendency to turn to waste disposal, nuclear storage and other potentially toxic activities as a means for economic development. Dugway and Skull Valley have also been featured in Rage, The Andromeda Strain, Outbreak and Species.

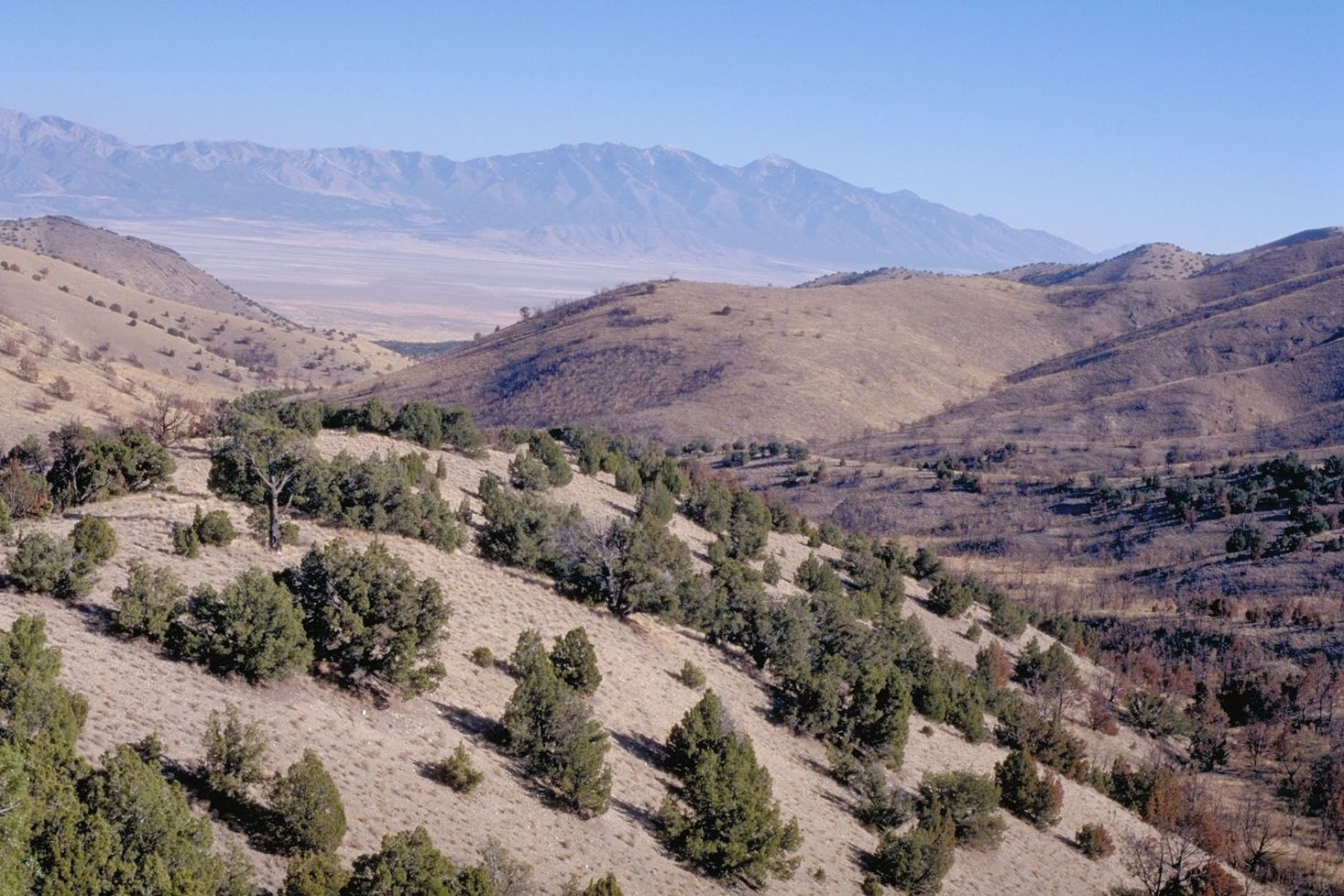
A view of Skull Valley from the nearby Cedar Mountain Wilderness.

Additionally, the Dugway Proving Ground's experiments with viruses 14 miles (23 km) from the reservation; since the materials produced at this military experiment center are not well known, the future health risks to the residents of the reservation cannot be determined.

=== Nuclear waste storage debate ===
The question of the storage of nuclear waste on the reservation is one that divided the tribe for many years.

In 1987, the United States Congress created the Office of Nuclear Waste Negotiator in order to facilitate land deals with states, counties, and Native American tribes. In 1991, the first negotiator, David H. Leroy, sent out letters with offers up to millions of dollars to every federally recognized tribe in the country, offering millions of dollars in exchange for contracts permitting the storage of high-level nuclear waste on native land. The Skull Valley Band of Goshutes received a Phase I study grant in 1992 and a Phase II-A grant in 1993; by the later date, the tribe was one of just four tribes that remained interested. Congress eliminated the Office of Nuclear Waste Negotiator in 1994, but a private consortium of utility companies continued to negotiate over nuclear-waste storage deals with the Skull Valley Band and the Mescalero Apaches. In December 1996, Skull Valley Goshute Tribe chairman Leon Bear, signed a preliminary lease on behalf of the tribe with the consortium, providing for the storage of 40,000 tons of nuclear waste at the reservation. The utility companies stated that storage of nuclear waste would be an interim measure until the opening of the planned Yucca Mountain nuclear waste repository in Nevada. However, the Yucca Mountain project was killed due to political opposition, heightening the need for a high-level nuclear waste repository.

The nuclear-waste agreement was a politically controversial issue. Some tribal members supported the $3 billion project for its economic benefits while others (some of whom were members of Ohngo Gaudadeh Devia (OGD), a group of tribal members) were strongly opposed, with some calling it environmental racism. Utah's congressional delegation and three successive Utah governors also objected to a nuclear-waste facility in the area, Other opponents included group of 71 Indian tribes from across the country; a number of environmentalist groups, including the Southern Utah Wilderness Alliance, the Sierra Club, and National Environmental Coalition of Native Americans; the anti-nuclear Nuclear Information and Resource Service; and individual activists.

The Bureau of Indian Affairs (BIA) approved the lease in March 1997, but the agreement was not in effect as of 2006 "amid a mountain of lawsuits, regulatory hurdles and bitter opposition." In 2006, legislation sponsored by Utah congressman Rob Bishop was signed into law by President George W. Bush, declaring 100,000 acres in the region as wilderness area, thereby cutting off "the only practical route for a rail spur delivering heavy steel casks of spent fuel rods to the Goshute reservation." The legislation was supported by the Secretary of the Air Force; the U.S. Air Force uses Skull Valley as a flight path to the Utah Test and Training Range, and objections were raised to the risks of locating a nuclear-waste site at a location in which an aircraft crash could result in the accidental release of radiation.

On safety, the DEIS stated that leakage from casks is highly unlikely, that shipping nuclear waste cargo is no more dangerous than shipping any other cargo, and that the Goshute people of Skull Valley will not be affected disproportionally by the cask container storage facility. However, OGD believes that there could be cumulative impacts from many toxic activities on and near the reservation that could potentially affect the Goshute people.

In 2006, following ten years of review, the Nuclear Regulatory Commission (NRC) issued a license for the Private Fuel Storage (PFS) project, which the State of Utah challenged in federal court. Subsequently, further development was administratively blocked, but the U.S. Court of Appeals for the Tenth Circuit overturned these obstacles, giving the project a chance at viability. However, the BIA refused to approve lease agreement between the PFS and the Goshute tribune, and U.S. Bureau of Land Management denied an application of a right-of-way that would have been necessary "for offloading the waste and hauling it to the reservation." In December 2012, however, following these renewed obstacles, the project was finally killed as Private Fuel Storage requested the termination of its NRC license.

== See also ==
- List of Indian reservations in the United States
- Utah State Route 196
- Environmental Justice
