= Burmester, Utah =

Unincorporated community in the state of Utah, United States

- Unincorporated community
- Location within Utah Location within the United States
- Coordinates: 40°41′28″N 112°27′08″W
- Country: United States
- State: Utah
- County: Tooele
- Founded: Before 1906
- Named for: Frank T. Burmester
- Elevation: 4,219 ft (1,286 m)
- Time zone: UTC-7 (Mountain (MST))
  - Summer (DST): UTC-6 (MDT)
- Area code: 435
- GNIS feature ID: 1437515

Burmester is a ghost town in northeastern Tooele County, Utah, United States.

Historical population
Census	Pop.	Note	%±
1920	159		—
1930	164		3.1%
1940	28		−82.9%
Source: U.S. Census Bureau

== Description ==
Burmester is located along Interstate 80 on the north end of the Tooele Valley, near the southwestern edge of the Great Salt Lake, 7 miles (11 km) north of Grantsville.

Burmester was originally settled as a railroad community under the name of Grants Station; in 1906 it was renamed for landowner Frank T. Burmester. The community severely declined during the Great Depression.
