= Onaqui Mountains =

Mountain range in Tooele County, Utah, United States

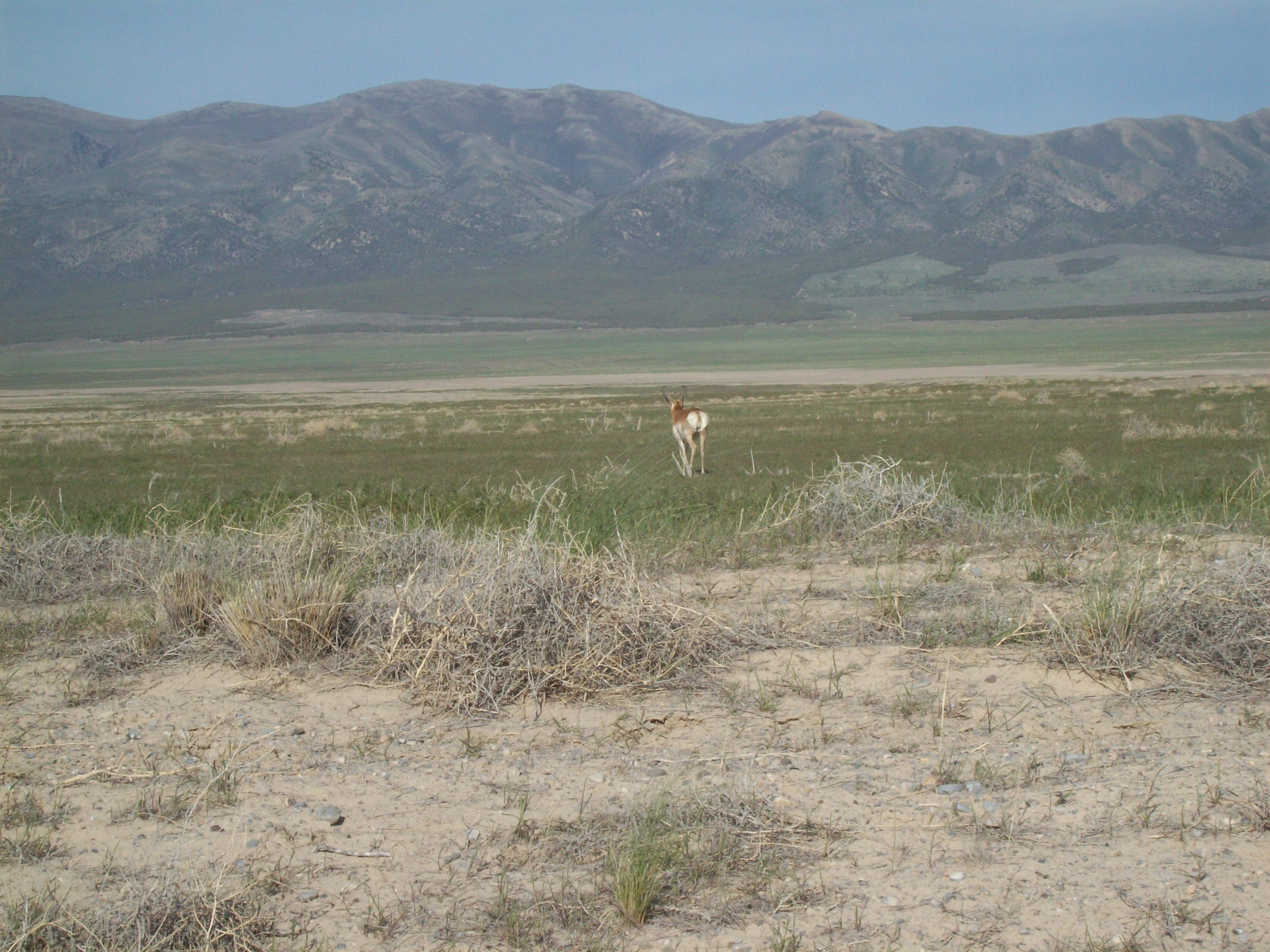
- Looking southeast toward the Onaqui Mountains, May 2009

Highest point
- Peak: Stookey Benchmark
- Elevation: 2,749 m (9,019 ft)
- Coordinates: 40°14′55″N 112°32′37″W

Geography
- Location within Utah
- Country: United States
- State: Utah
- County: Tooele County
- Range coordinates: 40°12′35.7977″N 112°33′37.848″W

The Onaqui Mountains are a mountain range in southeastern Tooele County, Utah United States.

== Description ==
The range is part of a continuous range with the Stansbury Mountains and Sheeprock Mountains. The highest point is Stookey Benchmark, which reaches 9,020 feet. Rush Valley is on the east side of the range and Skull Valley is to the west.

The Bureau of Land Management administers the Onaqui Mountains Herd Management Area, a 205,394 acres (83,120 ha) home to 450 wild horses. Horses have been in the area since the late 1800s, mostly from local ranch stock. There was concern that genetic variability of the herd was critically low, so horses from other HMAs were added to the herd. The goal was to improve adoptability by selecting for size, color and improved conformation.

== See also ==
- List of mountain ranges of Utah
