= Skull Valley (Utah) =

Valley in northwestern Utah, United States

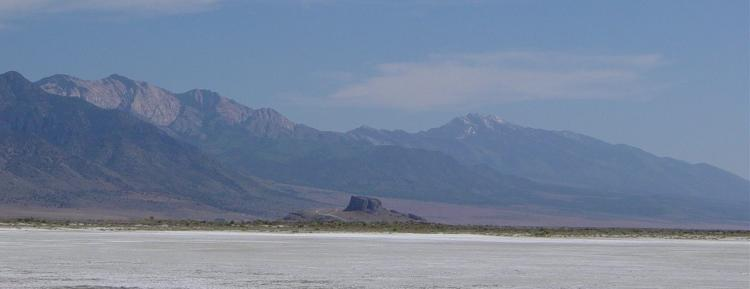
- View south-southeast, from Timpie area (northeast valley at Stansbury Mountains from Great Salt Lake (saltflats))

- Location within Utah
- Length: 40 mi (64 km)
- Width: 12 mi (19 km)

Geography
- Location: Tooele County, Utah, United States
- Communities: List: Iosepa; Terra; Dugway; Delle; Timpie
- Borders on: List: Cedar Mountains; Lakeside Mountains; Stansbury Bay (Great Salt Lake); Stansbury Mountains; Onaqui Mountains; Dugway; Great Salt Lake Desert
- Coordinates: 40°32′14″N 112°44′40″W
- Interactive map of Skull Valley

Skull Valley is a 40-mile (64 km) long valley located in east Tooele County, Utah, United States at the southwest of the Great Salt Lake. The valley trends north–south, but turns slightly northeast to meet Stansbury Bay, (adjacent Stansbury Island).

Skull Valley's south and southwest borders the southeast Great Salt Lake Desert at Dugway and at a ridgeline southeast from the Cedar Mountains.

The Skull Valley Indian Reservation is located in the valley's south at the southwest foothills of the Stansbury Mountains; adjacent southeast, the valley narrows between the Stansbury Mountains and the Cedar Mountains at the west, a region of creeks from the Stansburys and valley springs, Willow Patch Springs and Scribner Spring. Creeks and springs from the northwest Onaqui Mountains also feed the southeast valley region.

== Description ==
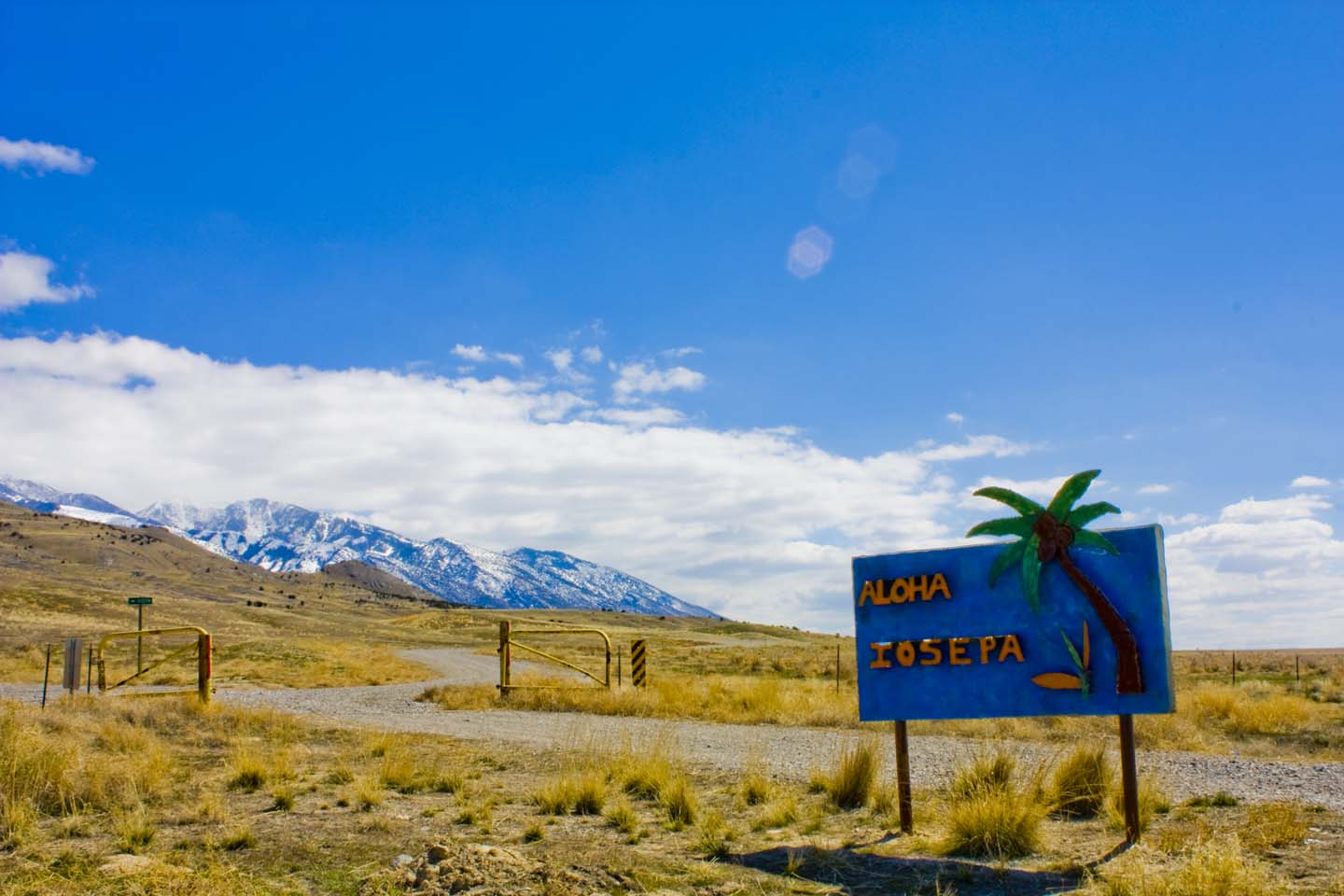
View south from Iosepa, Stansbury Mountains east

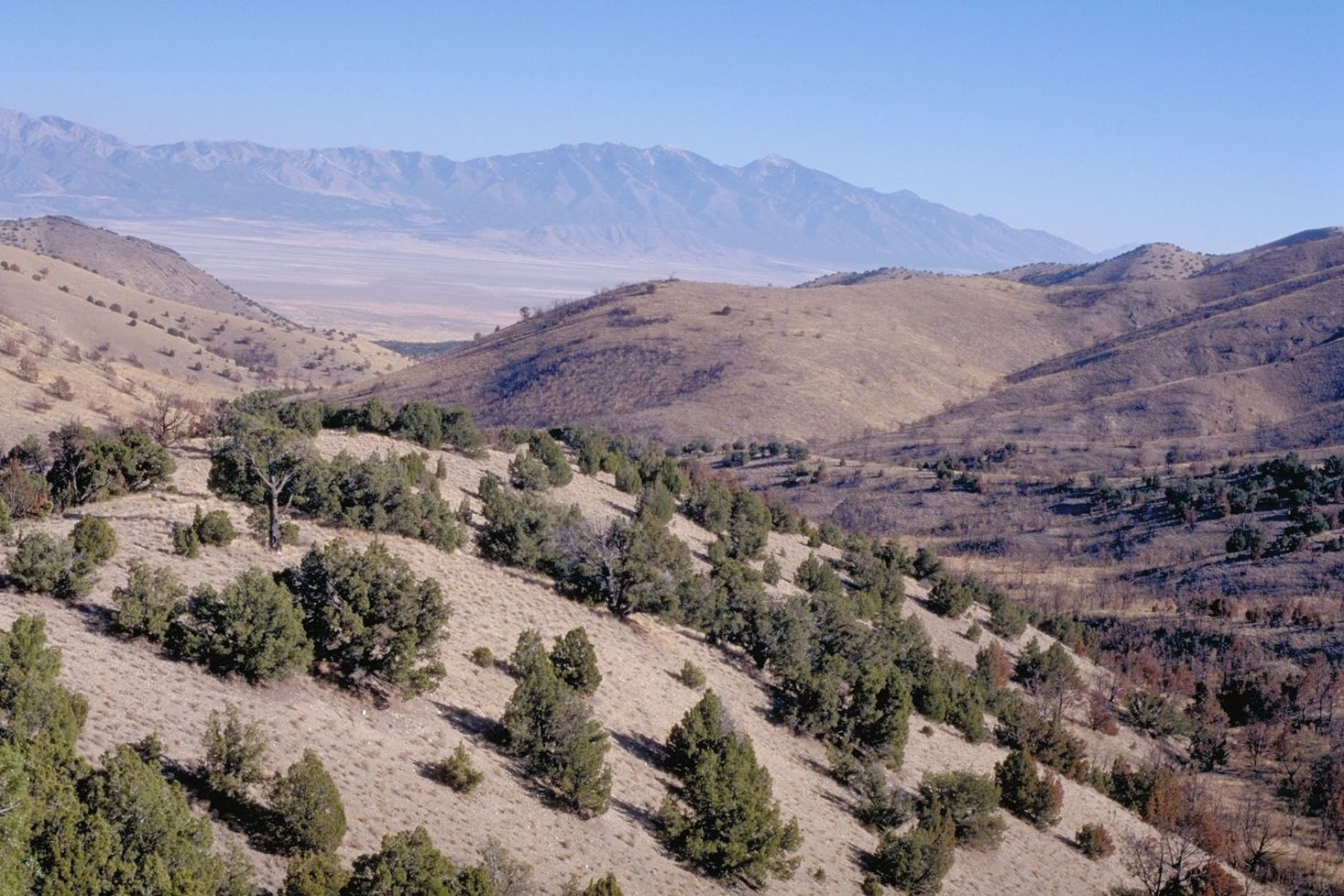
Southeast view of west Stansburys (over central Skull Valley), from Cedar Mountain Wilderness, in the Cedar Mountains

Skull Valley trends north-south but narrows slightly northeast towards Stansbury Bay; the Lakeside Mountains at Delle, and the northwest Stansbury Mountains at Timpie from the narrowing of the valley; Skull Valley and sections of the mountain ranges form the Great Salt Lake's southwest border.

Skull Valley narrows southeastwards at the springs, as described. Bordering southwest here, is a southeast trending 16 mi long ridgeline from the west perimeter Cedar Mountains, which separates the Dugway Proving Grounds and the Great Salt Lake Desert region from the southwest Skull Valley.

The valley's center is adjacent west of Iosepa. A dissected region of sinks and flood land from neighboring washes and creeks form this valley center; this dissected flood land area is about four miles wide at its widest southwest of Iosepa, and extends seven miles northwards towards the beginning of areas of salt flats, associated with the Great Salt Lake.

== See also ==
- List of valleys of Utah
- Davis Knolls – Desert hills in Skull Valley, Utah
- Dugway sheep incident – 1968 mass killing of sheep in Utah, U.S.
