= Terra, Utah =

Unincorporated community in the state of Utah, United States

- Unincorporated community
- Location within Utah Location within the United States
- Coordinates: 40°19′14″N 112°37′32″W
- Country: United States
- State: Utah
- County: Tooele
- Elevation: 5,217 ft (1,590 m)
- Time zone: UTC-7 (Mountain (MST))
  - Summer (DST): UTC-6 (MDT)
- Area code: 435
- GNIS feature ID: 1450526

Terra is an unincorporated community in Tooele County, Utah, United States. The community is on Utah State Route 199 9.7 miles (15.6 km) west-southwest of Rush Valley.
