= Iosepa, Utah =

- Ghost town
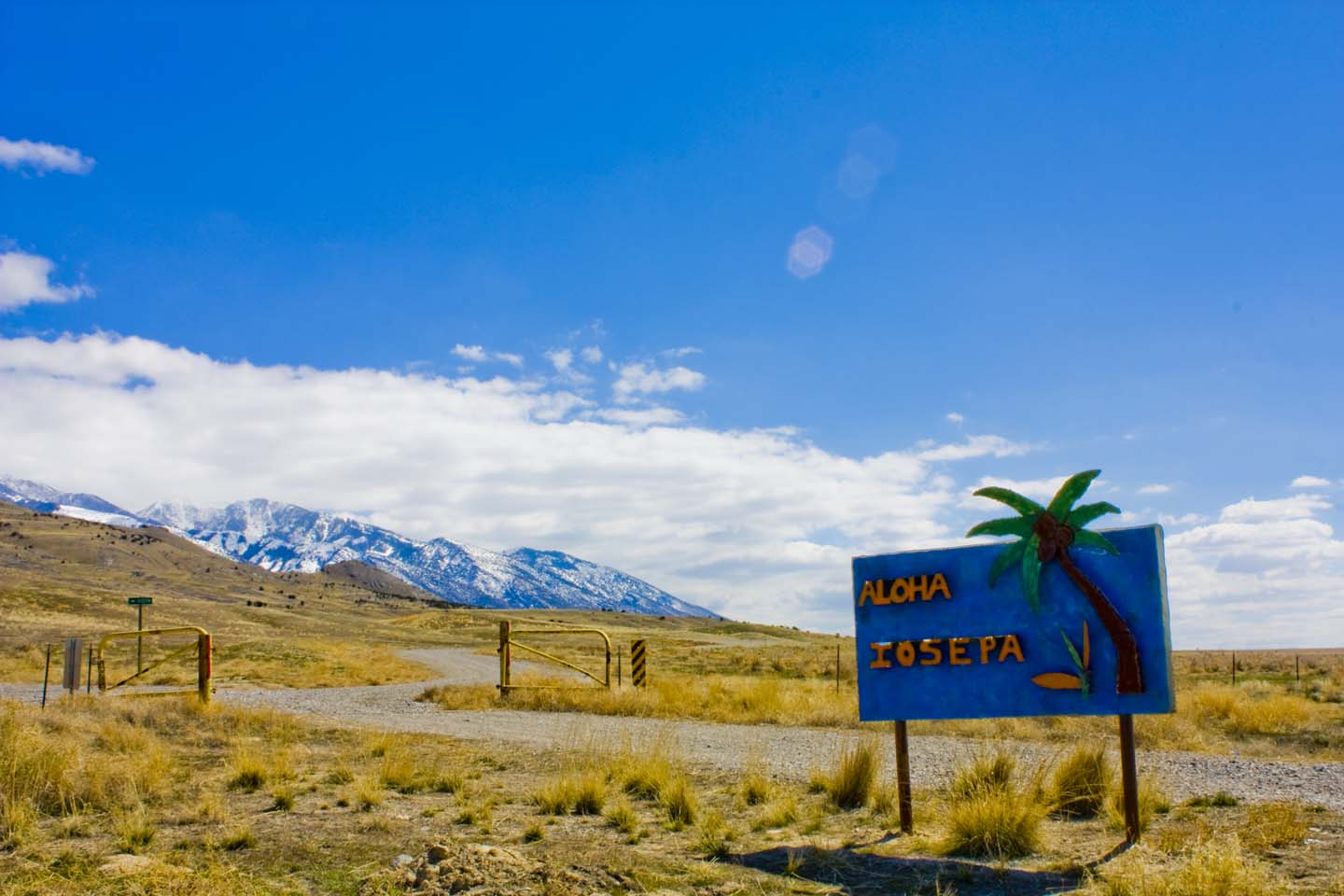
- Welcome sign at entrance to Iosepa historic site, April 2009

- Location within Utah Location within the United States
- Coordinates: 40°32′31″N 112°44′02″W
- Country: United States
- State: Utah
- County: Tooele
- Established: 1889
- Abandoned: 1917
- Named for: Joseph F. Smith
- Elevation: 4,400 ft (1,341 m)
- GNIS feature ID: 1455148
- Iosepa Settlement Cemetery
- U.S. National Register of Historic Places
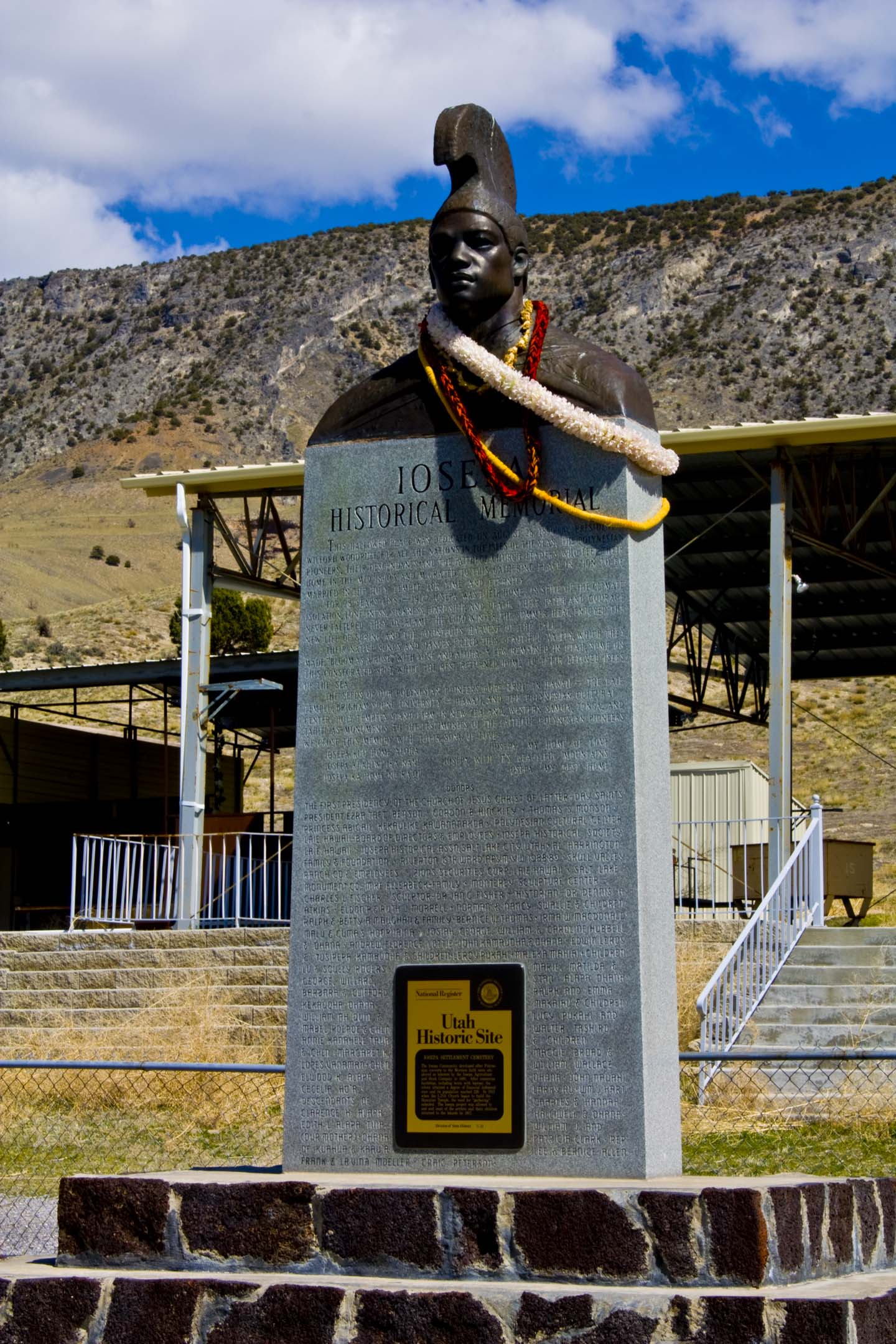
- Monument overlooking the Iosepa Settlement Cemetery
- Location: Iosepa, Skull Valley
- NRHP reference No.: 71000856
- Added to NRHP: August 12, 1971

Iosepa (/joʊˈsɛpə/ or /joʊˈsiːpə/, with the I pronounced like a double E in English) is a ghost town in the Skull Valley, located approximately 75 miles (120 km) southwest of Salt Lake City in Tooele County, Utah, United States. Once home to over 200 Polynesian members of The Church of Jesus Christ of Latter-day Saints (LDS Church), Iosepa was inhabited during the period 1889–1917. Today, it is the site of an annual Memorial Day gathering that draws islanders and others from all over the Western United States.

== History ==
=== Foundation ===
Mormon missionaries were sent to Polynesia starting in the 1850s. Many of their converts wanted to emigrate or "gather" to Utah with the main body of the Church, but were restricted by law, particularly in Hawaii. In the 1870s the Hawaiian government began to allow emigration, and by 1889 some 75 Native Hawaiians had gathered in the northern Salt Lake City neighborhood near Warm Springs Park. Despite their common faith, the immigrants experienced significant culture shock, as well as mistreatment by the white majority. The Polynesians were barred from staying in white-owned hotels and were refused service at restaurants in Salt Lake City. Church leaders began searching for a location to set aside as a Hawaiian enclave, but four decades of settlement had occupied most of the desirable land in the Salt Lake area.

In 1889, a group of three Hawaiian converts and three returned missionaries was assigned to choose a location. After considering possibilities in Cache, Weber, and Utah counties, they selected a 1,920-acre (777 ha) site in Skull Valley, known as the Quincy Ranch or the Rich Ranch, as a gathering place for the South Sea Islanders. The colony was organized as a joint stock company, the Iosepa Agriculture and Stock Company, owned by the LDS Church. The first 46 settlers arrived at the new townsite on August 28, 1889 and drew lots for land. August 28 was later designated as Hawaiian Pioneer Day.

The name Iosepa, a Hawaiian form of Joseph, was chosen in honor of Joseph F. Smith (1838–1918), one of the first missionaries from the Church to serve the Hawaiian people, and also in honor of his uncle, Joseph Smith (1805–1844), founder of the Latter Day Saint movement. The Iosepans' main reason for coming to Utah was to be near the Salt Lake Temple. After it opened in 1893, they traveled there as frequently as possible to participate in religious ceremonies.

=== Development and growth ===
Iosepa was an inhospitable location for any group of people. Most of the colonists were from Hawaii, though others were from different parts of Polynesia, and Skull Valley is desert, quite unlike the islands they had left. The Iosepans worked hard to improve their new home and eke out a living. The company purchased a sawmill and built homes, a church, school, and store. They also developed an extensive irrigation system to bring water from the Stansbury Mountains, allowing fields, lawns, and flowerbeds to be watered in the middle of the desert. The people planted crops, raised pigs, and even constructed ponds for raising carp and trout. They did their best to adapt or replace traditional foodstuffs not native to Utah, substituting on a mixture of flour and cornstarch for poi and experimenting with growing their own seaweed and other island products. Cattle and sheep were raised under the church-managed Iosepa Agricultural and Stock Company. They also built a small reservoir, called Kanaka Lake, where they could swim and have lakeside picnics. In 1899, residents of other parts of the state converged on Iosepa for an Arbor Day celebration in which they planted 300 walnut trees, 300 fruit trees, and 100 ornamental trees. The town became known for its neat streets lined with yellow roses, and in 1911 even won the state prize for the "best kept and most progressive city in the state of Utah."

=== Challenges ===
The settlement was well-planned, but is considered an unsuccessful attempt at colonization. Iosepa never managed to become self-sufficient; Latter-day Saint leaders had to allocate church funds to pay the town's expenses. The harsh environment was hard on Iosepans' health. Infectious disease took a heavy toll, including deaths from pneumonia, smallpox, and diphtheria. In 1896 there were even three cases of leprosy, and a pest house was built outside of town to isolate the lepers. Sensationalized newspaper reports of the outbreak alienated Iosepa even further from mainstream Utah society. Times became harder after several crop failures, and many of the men sought work as miners in the nearby gold and silver mines. Iosepa continued to grow despite all these challenges. The population increased from around 80 in 1901 to 228 at its peak in 1915. Most residents were Hawaiians, but there were also Samoans, Māori, Portuguese, Scots, and English.

=== Desertion ===
In 1915, Joseph F. Smith, then President of the LDS Church, announced plans for the construction of a temple at Lā'ie, Hawai'i. The first such temple to be built outside of continental North America, the Laie Hawaii Temple brought Iosepa to an end. Although Mormon leaders did not advise the Iosepans to emigrate to Hawaii, the Church did offer to pay the passage of any who wished to move but could not afford it. Most of Iosepa's residents chose to return to Hawaii. By January 1917, Iosepa was a ghost town, and the land was sold to the Deseret Livestock Company. Little remains of the original town other than the cemetery and a fire hydrant.

== Legacy ==
In 1971, the Iosepa cemetery was placed on the National Register of Historic Places. For many years Iosepa has been known for the rows of evenly spaced fire hydrants poking out through the sagebrush. As of 2004, all that remains are a few building foundations and the markers in the town's graveyard, which is surrounded by a chain-link fence. An historical marker gives a brief history of the settlement, which can easily be reached by automobile.

In 1980, a Memorial Day activity was organized at Iosepa, where a few Utah Polynesian families, some descended from Iosepans, repaired the fence and beautified the graveyard area. This marked the beginning of an annual tradition that continues to grow. In the mid-1980s, the Iosepa Historical Association was incorporated to foster appreciation of Utah's Polynesian heritage and history. The association works to preserve the townsite and organize the festival. On August 28, 1989, Iosepa's centennial, President Gordon B. Hinckley of the First Presidency of The Church of Jesus Christ of Latter-day Saints dedicated a monument at the cemetery, featuring a bronze bust of a Polynesian warrior. That year the Memorial Day celebration was transformed from a one-day work activity to an elaborate three-day weekend luau. Every Memorial Day weekend hundreds of Polynesians and those interested in Polynesian history—about 1000 people in 2007—gather at the site for the celebration. Restrooms and a large concrete pavilion were added for the 1999 festival, and the association has plans for further improvements to welcome the growing crowds. Camping is encouraged, and visitors are always welcome.

== See also ==
- List of ghost towns in Utah
- National Register of Historic Places listings in Tooele County, Utah
