= Cedar Mountain Wilderness =

Mountain of United States

- IUCN category Ib (wilderness area)
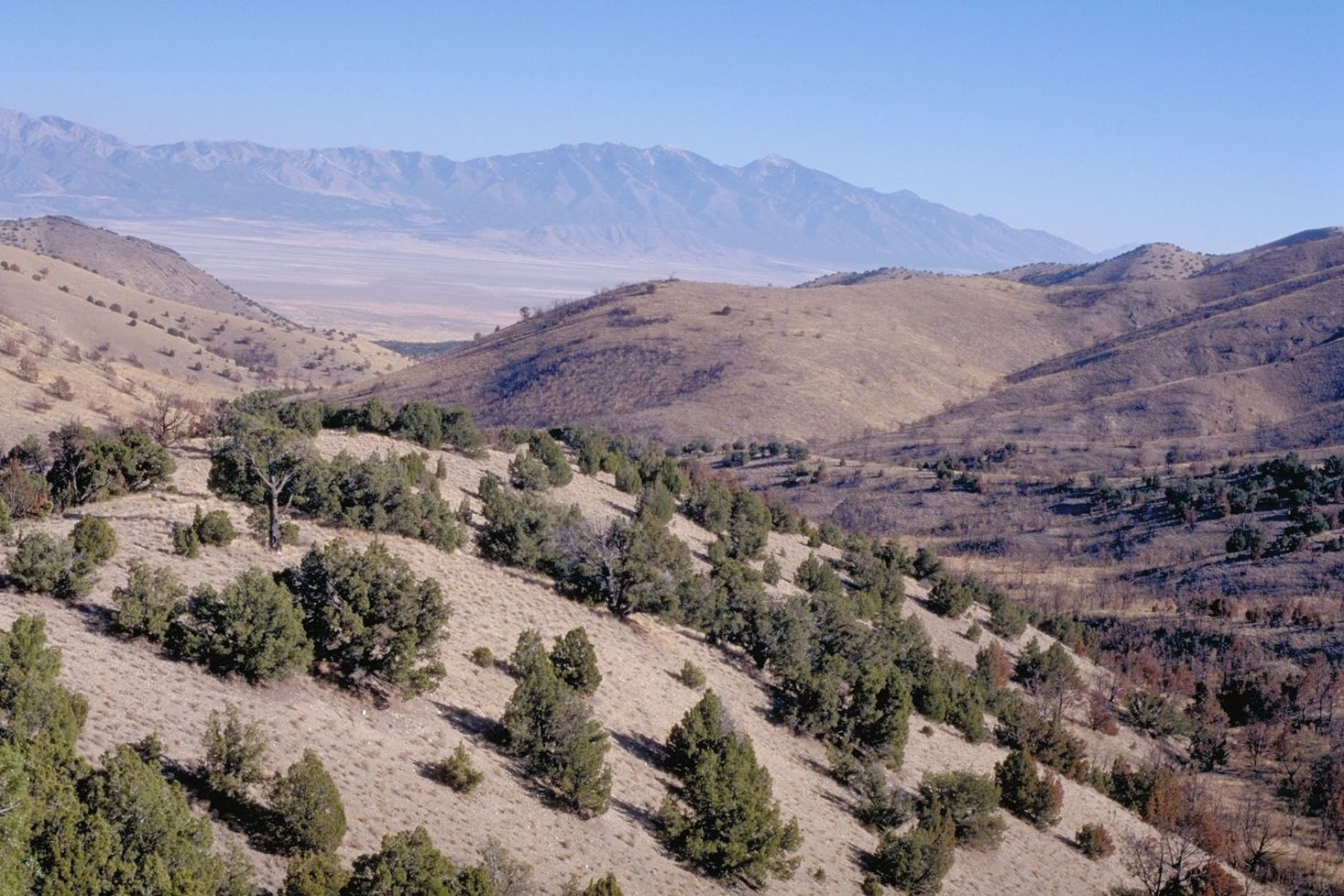

- Location within the United States Location within Utah
- Location: Tooele County, Utah; United States
- Nearest city: Tooele, Utah
- Coordinates: 40.590794°N 112.949742°W
- Area: 104,585 acres (423.24 km^{2})
- Established: January 6, 2006
- Governing body: U.S. Bureau of Land Management

The Cedar Mountain Wilderness is located in northwestern Utah, United States, just south of Interstate 80. The vegetation on the upper elevations of the Cedar Mountains is dominated by junipers (referred to as "cedars" by early pioneers). The foothill and valley regions include mixed desert shrubs. Cheatgrass is prevalent over large areas burned by range fires. The remains of an aragonite mining camp can also be found in the foothills.

The Cedar Mountain Wilderness includes more than half of the 180,000 acres (730 km^{2}) Cedar Mountain Herd Management Area, where feral horses have grazed since they were introduced in the late 19th century. A survey conducted in December 1991 counted 444 horses, and parts of the herd can often be seen on the wilderness. The Bureau of Land Management fills watering troughs for the horses when springs dry up in the summer. This artificial water supply benefits other wildlife species such as pronghorn antelope.

The U.S. Congress designated the Cedar Mountain Wilderness, in an effort sponsored by Utah representative Rob Bishop and the Utah governor, to block rail access to a proposed high-level nuclear waste storage facility on the nearby Skull Valley Indian Reservation. The project was sponsored by a consortium of nuclear power companies known as Private Fuel Storage. The project was killed in 2012 amid legal obstacles and substantial local opposition.

== See also ==
- Dugway Proving Grounds
- List of U.S. Wilderness Areas
- National Wilderness Preservation System
- Wilderness Act
