= Sheeprock Mountains =

Mountain in the American state of Utah

- Location within Utah

Highest point
- Peak: Black Crook Peak
- Elevation: 9,274 ft (2,827 m)
- Coordinates: 39°59′04″N 112°32′24″W

Dimensions
- Length: 24 mi (39 km) NW x SE
- Width: 9 mi (14 km) (+ a very narrow north stretch to the Onaqui Mountains)

Geography
- Country: United States
- State: Utah
- Regions: Great Basin Desert and Sevier Desert
- Counties: Tooele and Juab
- Communities: Vernon, Lofgreen and Jericho Junction
- Borders on: Dugway, Dugway Proving Ground, Onaqui Mountains, Rush Valley, West Tintic Mountains, Sevier Desert and Simpson Mountains

The Sheeprock Mountains are a 24-mile (39 km) long mountain range located in extreme southeast Tooele County, Utah, and part of northeast Juab County. The range trends southeasterly and forms a section of the northeast perimeter of the large Sevier Desert, which lies southwest of the Sheeprock Mountains.

The Sheeprock Mountains also lie adjacent to two other region perimeters. About 15-mi northwest is Dugway and the entrance to the Dugway Proving Ground, on the southeast perimeter of the Great Salt Lake Desert. The northeast flank of the range forms the southwest border of endorheic Rush Valley; Rush Valley, and endorheic Cedar Valley adjacent east, are west of Utah Lake (and Valley), with all three valleys being just south of the Great Salt Lake perimeter region.

== Description ==
The center of the Sheeprock Mountains contains a southeast-trending ridgeline about 10-mi long. Just northwest of center is the range highpoint, Black Crook Peak, at 9,274 feet (2,827 m). Black Peak, 8,906 feet (2,715 m), and Dutch Peak, 8,964 feet (2,732 m) anchor the southeast section of the ridgeline.

The southeast of the range merges north into mountains/hills that extend into Rush Valley, forming a small valley west, against the Sheeprock northeast flank. The mountainous area is from both the south Sheeprocks and the north of the West Tintic Mountains. Red Skin Knolls, 7,084 feet (2,159 m), of the Sheeprocks lies between, at the south of Rush Valley.

At the Sheeprock Mountains northwest terminus, a narrow stretch of hills/ or mountains extend due-north to connect to the south of the Onaqui's; Lookout Pass separates Little Mountain, (a standalone mountain peak, at 6,696 feet (2,041 m)), from Red Pine Mountain in the north terminus region of the Sheeprocks, (at 8,516 feet (2,596 m)).

== Access ==
The major access to the Sheeprock Mountains is to its northeast section at the south of Rush Valley, by way of Utah State Route 36, and Vernon. The route transits due-south to Vernon, but then goes southeast to Lofgreen, (at the north-northeast of the West Tintic Mountains), and the East Tintics. South from Vernon, is farmland routes, but numerous creeks, and canyons descend northeasterly from the Sheeprocks, containing unimproved roads.

The northwest of the range has to be accessed from Dugway, (Dugway Proving Ground)-(southeast perimeter region of the Great Salt Lake Desert), by way of unimproved roads. Utah 199 and Utah 196 access Dugway.

The south of the range has to be accessed from unimproved roads from the Sevier Desert; the south of the range lies adjacent west, of the West Tintic Mountains, southern terminus. The desert can be accessed from Jericho Junction by way of U.S. Route 6.

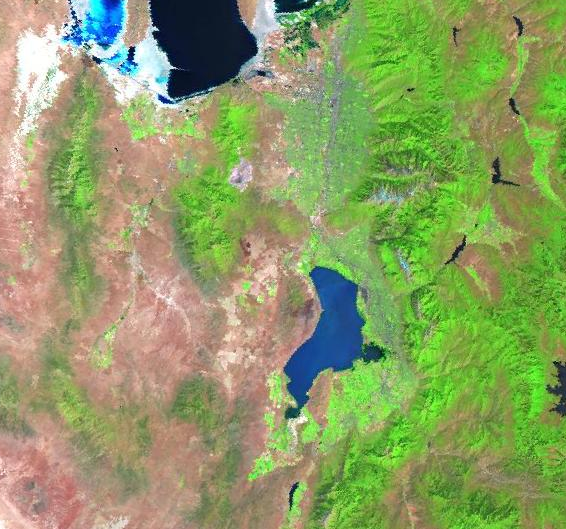
False color Landsat photo, Sheeprock Mtns at southwest of Rush Valley
(see text, description of endorheic Rush Valley and Cedar Valley)
