= Rush Valley =

Valley in Tooele County, Utah, US

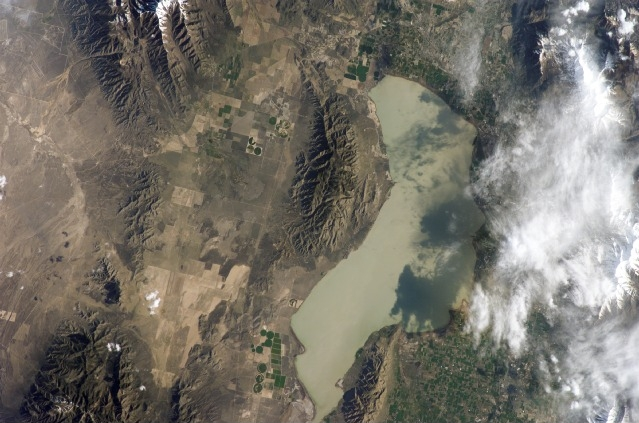
- (east & southeast)-Rush Valley (at photo left)

- Location within Utah

Geography
- Location: United States, Utah, Tooele County
- Coordinates: 40°11′03″N 112°23′31″W
- Interactive map of Rush Valley

Rush Valley is a 30-mile (48 km) long north-trending valley in the southeast of Tooele County, Utah. It lies adjacent to and attached to the south of Tooele Valley; the separation point is the low point of the valley at Rush Lake, and lies at the southeast of the small mountain massif causing the separation, South Mountain at 6,541 feet (1,994 m). The region of Rush Lake is a marsh region, fed by various streams from the mountain regions east and west.

A southern section of the Tooele Army Depot lies in the valley's center-northeast, at the southwest foothills of the Oquirrh Mountains.

== Valley description ==
Rush Valley narrows to about 7 miles (11 km) wide in the north, between the Stansbury Mountains west, and the Oquirrh Mountains east. The valley widens in the south, making two sections, a due-south section, and a region to the southeast. The southern section contains the communities of Vernon and Faust, with Faust north, closer to the valley's center-south. Vernon is in flatlands fed by the Sheeprock Mountains or foothills, southwest, south, and southeast.

The southeast valley section is 16 miles (26 km) long from the Rush Valley center and lies at the northwest of the East Tintic Mountains. A ridge north separates Rush Valley from Cedar Valley to the east. Lofgreen is in mountain foothills southwest, and Pehrson with Topliff are in lower elevation regions.

The two southern sections cover a width of about 15 miles (24 km), south of the valley center. The Rush Valley Centerpoint is north of Faust, and the small James Walter Fitzgerald Wildlife Management Area.

== Access ==
Utah State Route 36 (SR-36) transects the center of the valley, starting from a section at the northeast, from Tooele and Stockton. It turns and leaves the valley's southeast to meet the region of Eureka and Silver City in the East Tintic Mountains.

Utah State Route 73 (SR-73) joins SR-36 at the valley's center after traversing the south of the Oquirrh Mountains in the valley's southeast (the north perimeter of the southeast section).

From the West, Utah State Route 199 (SR-199) enters the valley center from Dugway, and its canyon route through the western mountains is the dividing line between the Stansbury Mountains north, and the Onaqui Mountains south.

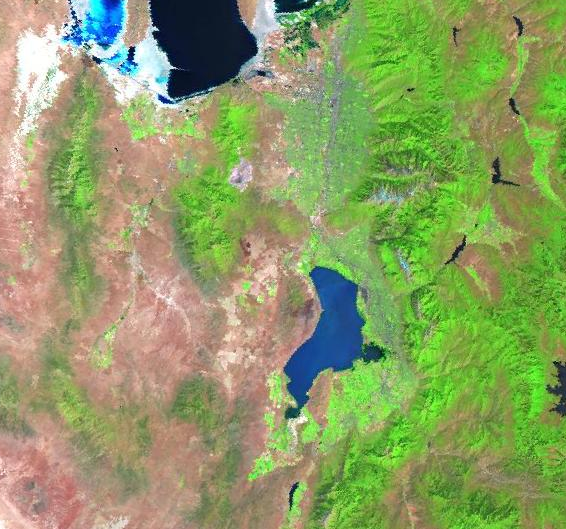
3 valley sequences (west-to-east) —
Skull Valley, Tooele Valley-north & Rush Valley-south, Cedar Valley-(southeast, and smallest valley, at Lake Mountains, west border of Utah Lake)

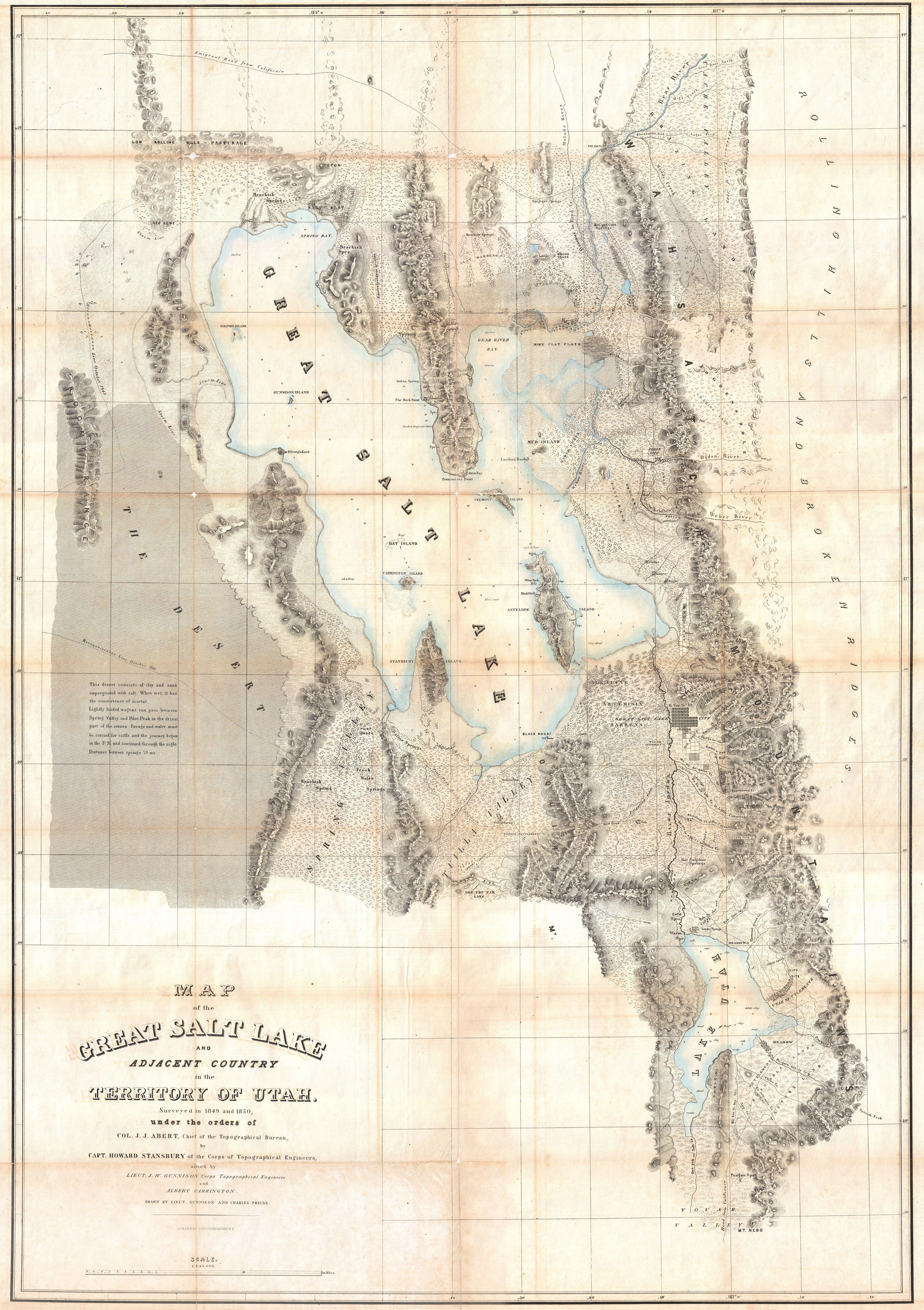
1852 Stansbury Map
