= Ajax, Utah =

Ajax
- Ghost town
- Location within Utah Location within the United States
- Coordinates: 40°13′33″N 112°23′32″W
- Country: United States
- State: Utah
- County: Tooele
- Established: 1869
- Abandoned: 1900
- Named for: William Ajax

Ajax is a ghost town located in the Rush Valley area of southeastern Tooele County, Utah, United States. The town grew up around a unique department store started in 1869 by a Welsh immigrant named William Ajax. He operated the Ajax Underground Store until his death in 1899, and the settlement came to an end as the other residents left by 1900. All that remains today is a hole in the ground, with a historical marker standing nearby.

== History ==
The area was first settled in 1863 by a group of Welsh farmers, who called their little settlement Centre (or Center) for its location in the middle of the valley between Stockton and Vernon. As numerous mines were being developed in eastern Tooele County in the 1860s, small towns began to dot the region.

In 1869, William Ajax, whose department store business in Salt Lake City was failing, moved his family to a dugout in the Centre area. He had learned of the emerging market and started growing hay to sell to the mines. He built a two-room adobe house as a permanent shelter close to his hay fields. More accustomed to keeping a shop than raising a crop, Ajax soon began stocking the kitchen shelf with dry goods and supplies to sell to passing travelers. Business boomed; by 1870 a post office was set up in his store, which had outgrown the Ajax home and needed its own location.

=== Underground department store ===
Having lived in an underground home, William Ajax chose to construct an underground store. He began digging into the desert soil and lining the hole with cedar timbers. When he had a chamber around 1800 square feet (160 m^{2}) in area and 10–15 feet (3–4.5 m) deep, he added roof beams and an earthen roof, with a south-facing skylight. The Ajax Underground Store was open for business.

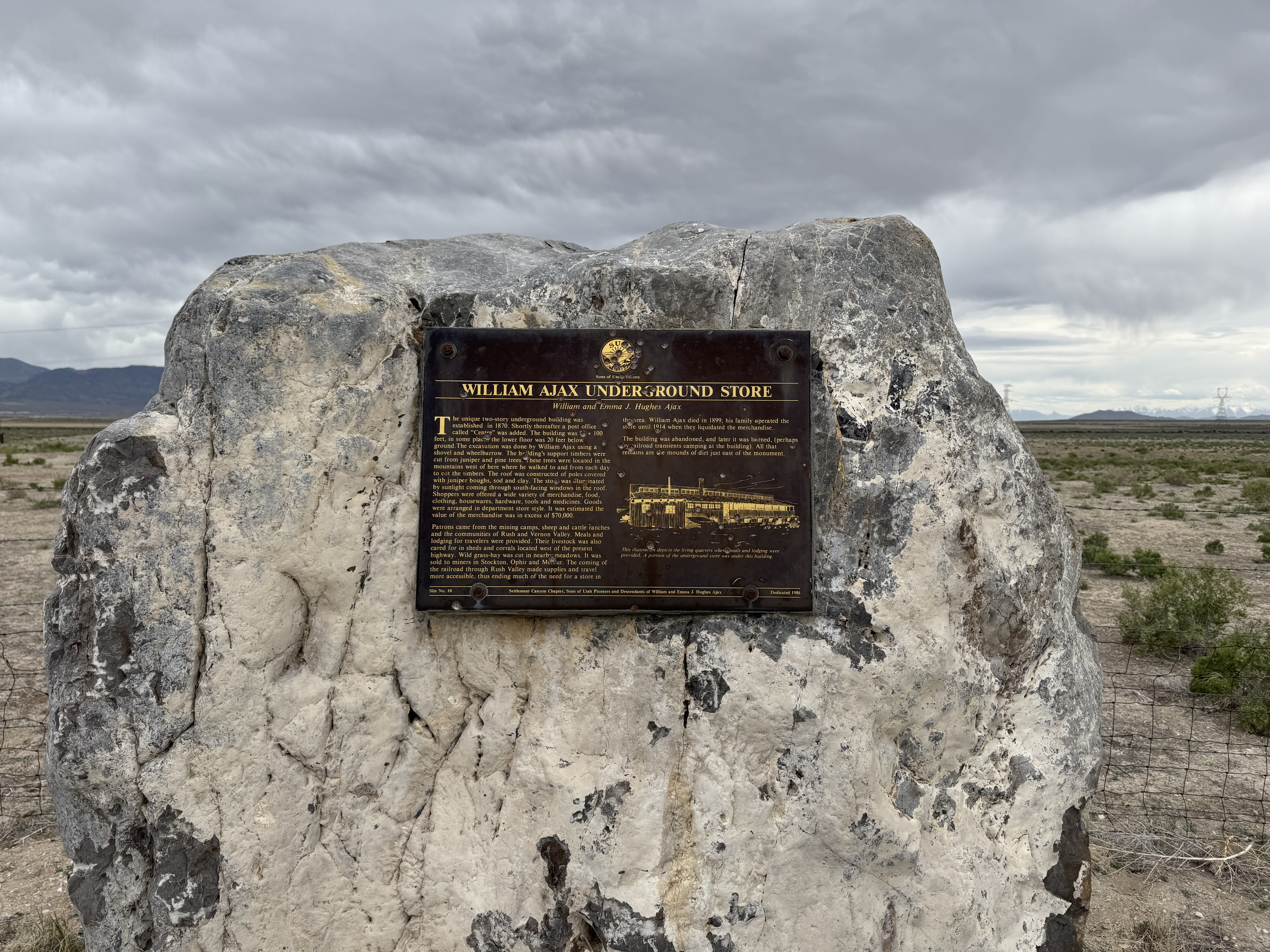
William Ajax underground store historical marker

From the beginning the store operated as much more than a mere general store, offering expensive textiles and fine imported tableware in addition to the necessities of frontier life. Local miners and ranchers could buy supplies to last through the winter, while their wives browsed through elegant cut crystal glassware and ornate figurines in comfort, protected from the harsh elements of the desert. The store became a gathering place for residents of such nearby communities as Mercur, Stockton, and Ophir, and an important stopping point for overland travelers. An above-ground hotel was soon added, with stables and corrals that could hold 100 horses, 300 cattle, and 6,000 sheep. As it began to grow into a town in its own right, the settlement was named Puckerville, but the name didn't stick. Although the post office kept the name of Centre, people called the place Ajax.

William soon found need for further expansion; he kept digging until the store's main room stretched 80 feet (24 m) long and 100 feet (30 m) wide. Additional branching rooms eventually brought the Ajax Underground Store to a total area of 11,000 square feet (1000 m^{2}), with over $75,000 worth of merchandise in stock. It was reported that the "Big Store", as locals called it, did more business than any similar Salt Lake City emporium.

=== Decline ===
The store began to lose business when the railroad was built nearby and people could easily travel to Salt Lake for a variety of errands. When William Ajax died in 1899 he left the store to his sons, but the town of Ajax quickly dissolved. By 1900 only the Ajax family remained, continuing to run the store in the face of increasing competition. The rise of mail order catalogs was especially bad for business. The closure of Mercur in 1913 was the final blow; the Ajax Underground Store was finally forced to close in 1914. Most of the above-ground buildings were moved to other locations, but the underground store had to stay in place. In the 1920s it became a popular refuge for passing hoboes, but one of their fires burned it completely, leaving only a depression in the ground to mark the site of Ajax.
