= 1924 United States presidential election in Utah =

- November 4, 1924

Nominee	Calvin Coolidge	John W. Davis	Robert M. La Follette
Party	Republican	Democratic	Independent Progressive
Home state	Massachusetts	West Virginia	Wisconsin
Running mate	Charles G. Dawes	Charles W. Bryan	Burton K. Wheeler
Electoral vote	4	0	0
Popular vote	77,327	47,001	32,662
Percentage	49.26%	29.94%	20.81%
County results
Coolidge
30–40%
40–50%
50–60%
60–70%
70–80%
80–90%
President before election
Calvin Coolidge
Republican
Elected President
Calvin Coolidge
Republican

The 1924 United States presidential election in Utah took place on November 4, 1924, as part of the 1924 United States presidential election. All contemporary forty-eight states took part, and state voters selected four voters to the Electoral College, who voted for president and vice president.

Rapid recovery of the economy from a sharp recession following World War I transformed the 1920s into a strongly Republican decade. Even the problematic issue of a farm depression had eased by the time of the election as prices recovered. It was also widely thought that the Teapot Dome scandal could do nothing to revive the Democrats as they were well known to have equally severe problems therewith via the fact that recently deceased Woodrow Wilson had paid one hundred and fifty thousand dollars in legal fees to nomination frontrunner William McAdoo.

Consequently, Utah voters strongly supported incumbent president Calvin Coolidge, who had come to power after Harding's death in 1923. As Harding had done four years earlier, Coolidge won all twenty-nine counties in Utah, a feat to be repeated by later Republican candidates in 1956, 1972, 1980, 1984, 2000, 2004 and 2012. The conservatism of Coolidge and Democratic nominee John W. Davis – the only ever major party presidential nominee from West Virginia and the first from an antebellum slave state (including border states) since the Civil War – led more liberal supporters of both parties to support Progressive Robert M. La Follette. Utah's conservative Mormonism meant that La Follette was not as popular as in other western states, and he finished third well behind Davis. La Follette nonetheless did outpoll Davis in the Wasatch Front counties of Salt Lake and Weber, as well as the eastern, ethnically more diverse Carbon County.

For this election, Utah essentially voted as the nation did, with the state on a two-party basis coming out as 5.90 percent more Democratic than the nation at-large, although the total Davis vote was within one percent of the national average, and the La Follette vote three percent higher than the country at-large, though lower than any state to the north or west. Utah was along with Arizona and New Mexico the only Mountain state where La Follette did not carry any county.

== Results ==
General Election Results
Party	Pledged to	Elector	Votes
Republican Party	Calvin Coolidge	Lyman Skeen	77,327
Republican Party	Calvin Coolidge	Rose H. Hamblin	77,176
Republican Party	Calvin Coolidge	Thomas F. Kearns	77,149
Republican Party	Calvin Coolidge	Mrs. Henry Taggart	76,933
Democratic Party	John W. Davis	Inez Knight Allen	47,001
Democratic Party	John W. Davis	Neil M. Madsen	46,937
Democratic Party	John W. Davis	J. P. Showalter	46,908
Democratic Party	John W. Davis	Mrs. H. J. Hayward	46,872
Independent-Progressive	Robert M. La Follette	F. C. Bobo	32,662
Independent-Progressive	Robert M. La Follette	Vina Holdaway	32,554
Independent-Progressive	Robert M. La Follette	John W. Aird	32,553
Independent-Progressive	Robert M. La Follette	W. J. Toy	32,298
Votes cast (Note: Based on highest elector on each ticket)			156,990

=== Results by county ===
County	Calvin Coolidge Republican		John W. Davis Democratic		Robert M. La Follette Progressive		Margin		Total votes cast
County	#	%	#	%	#	%	#	%	Total votes cast
Beaver	989	53.34%	578	31.18%	287	15.48%	411	22.17%	1,854
Box Elder	3,086	56.18%	1,841	33.52%	566	10.30%	1,245	22.67%	5,493
Cache	4,973	52.01%	3,915	40.94%	674	7.05%	1,058	11.06%	9,562
Carbon	1,878	37.59%	1,528	30.58%	1,590	31.83%	288 (Note: In this county where Davis ran third behind Coolidge and La Follette, margin given is Coolidge vote minus La Follette vote and percentage margin Coolidge percentage minus La Follette percentage.)	5.76%	4,996
Daggett	97	74.05%	26	19.85%	8	6.11%	71	54.20%	131
Davis	2,265	55.51%	1,507	36.94%	308	7.55%	758	18.58%	4,080
Duchesne	1,277	57.60%	731	32.97%	209	9.43%	546	24.63%	2,217
Emery	979	42.98%	916	40.21%	383	16.81%	63	2.77%	2,278
Garfield	823	69.57%	308	26.04%	52	4.40%	515	43.53%	1,183
Grand	278	47.93%	243	41.90%	59	10.17%	35	6.03%	580
Iron	1,429	66.47%	485	22.56%	236	10.98%	944	43.91%	2,150
Juab	1,325	43.57%	1,241	40.81%	475	15.62%	84	2.76%	3,041
Kane	515	80.22%	117	18.22%	10	1.56%	398	61.99%	642
Millard	1,917	55.74%	1,025	29.81%	497	14.45%	892	25.94%	3,439
Morgan	482	54.10%	360	40.40%	49	5.50%	122	13.69%	891
Piute	398	61.42%	208	32.10%	42	6.48%	190	29.32%	648
Rich	403	62.48%	211	32.71%	31	4.81%	192	29.77%	645
Salt Lake	27,215	46.44%	14,853	25.35%	16,534	28.21%	10,681	18.23%	58,602
San Juan	380	56.89%	232	34.73%	56	8.38%	148	22.16%	668
Sanpete	3,374	56.39%	2,228	37.24%	381	6.37%	1,146	19.15%	5,983
Sevier	2,111	56.44%	1,201	32.11%	428	11.44%	910	24.33%	3,740
Summit	1,597	57.16%	825	29.53%	372	13.31%	772	27.63%	2,794
Tooele	1,295	52.47%	674	27.31%	499	20.22%	621	25.16%	2,468
Uintah	1,296	60.90%	716	33.65%	116	5.45%	580	27.26%	2,128
Utah	6,946	46.28%	5,226	34.82%	2,838	18.91%	1,720	11.46%	15,010
Wasatch	1,105	52.39%	727	34.47%	277	13.13%	378	17.92%	2,109
Washington	1,181	54.96%	868	40.39%	100	4.65%	313	14.56%	2,149
Wayne	331	57.27%	241	41.70%	6	1.04%	90	15.57%	578
Weber	7,382	43.60%	3,970	23.45%	5,579	32.95%	1,803	10.65%	16,931
Totals	77,327	49.26%	47,001	29.94%	32,662	20.81%	30,326	19.32%	156,990

== See also ==
- United States presidential elections in Utah
