= 1928 United States presidential election in Utah =

- November 6, 1928

| Nominee | Herbert Hoover | Al Smith |
| Party | Republican | Democratic |
| Home state | California | New York |
| Running mate | Charles Curtis | Joseph T. Robinson |
| Electoral vote | 4 | 0 |
| Popular vote | 94,618 | 80,985 |
| Percentage | 53.58% | 45.86% |
County results
Hoover
40–50%
50–60%
60–70%
70–80%
Smith
50–60%
President before election
Calvin Coolidge
Republican
Elected President
Herbert Hoover
Republican

The 1928 United States presidential election in Utah took place on November 6, 1928, as part of the 1928 United States presidential election. All contemporary forty-eight states took part, and state voters selected four voters to the Electoral College, who voted for president and vice president.

Utah voted for Republican nominee Herbert Hoover, formerly Secretary of Commerce, over the Democratic nominee, four-time New York governor Al Smith. Mormon Utah was much less affected by anti-Catholic passion against Smith and his faith than either the Protestant Upper South or the secular Pacific Northwest: indeed the LDS hierarchy endorsed Smith when he won the Democratic nomination. In fact, in the days before the election it was thought by pollsters that Smith would carry the state, although neither Cox nor Davis nor La Follette had won a single county during the previous two elections. However, late swings gave the state to Hoover by a margin whose size increased in late counting.

Nonetheless, the LDS endorsement did cause Utah to prove Smith's eleventh-strongest state – and his strongest outside the urban Northeast or the "Solid South" – voting 9.70 percent more Democratic than the nation at-large. Smith divided the sizable 1924 La Follette vote with Hoover, and carried the ethnically diverse mining-based Carbon County by fourteen, and also won a five-point majority in Juab County in the state's west for the first Republican losses in any Utah county since 1916 when anti-war sentiment shifted the state to Woodrow Wilson.

== Results ==
General Election Results
| Party | Pledged to | Elector | Votes |
|---|---|---|---|
| Republican Party | Herbert Hoover | Albert E. Miller | 94,618 |
| Republican Party | Herbert Hoover | Dan B. Berry | 94,613 |
| Republican Party | Herbert Hoover | Winslow F. Smith | 94,485 |
| Republican Party | Herbert Hoover | Clara Randolph | 94,275 |
| Democratic Party | Al Smith | William Scoweroit | 80,985 |
| Democratic Party | Al Smith | Abel John Evans | 80,880 |
| Democratic Party | Al Smith | J. Frank Tolton | 80,842 |
| Democratic Party | Al Smith | Mrs. J. J. Galligan | 80,780 |
| Socialist Party | Norman Thomas | Albert F. Gower | 954 |
| Socialist Party | Norman Thomas | William E. Tinnaman Sr. | 949 |
| Socialist Party | Norman Thomas | William Black | 948 |
| Socialist Party | Norman Thomas | James Monroe | 948 |
| Workers Party | William Z. Foster | J. E. Sherren | 47 |
| Workers Party | William Z. Foster | D. Conta | 39 |
| Workers Party | William Z. Foster | George Kottas | 38 |
| Workers Party | William Z. Foster | Elda Shippee | 38 |
| Votes cast (Note: Based on highest elector on each ticket) | | | 176,603 |

=== Results by county ===
| County | Herbert Hoover Republican | | Al Smith Democratic | | Norman Thomas Socialist | | William Z. Foster Workers | | Margin | | Total votes cast |
| County | # | % | # | % | # | % | # | % | # | % | Total votes cast |
|---|---|---|---|---|---|---|---|---|---|---|---|
| Beaver | 1,149 | 54.98% | 936 | 44.78% | 5 | 0.24% | 0 | 0.00% | 213 | 10.20% | 2,090 |
| Box Elder | 3,317 | 56.94% | 2,488 | 42.71% | 20 | 0.34% | 0 | 0.00% | 829 | 14.23% | 5,825 |
| Cache | 5,297 | 52.60% | 4,748 | 47.15% | 26 | 0.26% | 0 | 0.00% | 549 | 5.45% | 10,071 |
| Carbon | 2,184 | 42.10% | 2,954 | 56.94% | 47 | 0.96% | 3 | 0.06% | -770 | -14.84% | 5,188 |
| Daggett | 107 | 77.54% | 31 | 22.46% | 0 | 0.00% | 0 | 0.00% | 76 | 55.08% | 138 |
| Davis | 2,508 | 52.05% | 2,296 | 47.65% | 14 | 0.29% | 0 | 0.00% | 212 | 4.40% | 4,818 |
| Duchesne | 1,585 | 63.48% | 899 | 36.00% | 13 | 0.52% | 0 | 0.00% | 686 | 27.48% | 2,497 |
| Emery | 1,317 | 57.06% | 965 | 41.81% | 26 | 1.13% | 0 | 0.00% | 352 | 15.25% | 2,308 |
| Garfield | 1,024 | 75.63% | 325 | 24.00% | 5 | 0.37% | 0 | 0.00% | 699 | 51.63% | 1,354 |
| Grand | 347 | 52.58% | 310 | 46.97% | 3 | 0.45% | 0 | 0.00% | 37 | 5.61% | 660 |
| Iron | 1,823 | 72.11% | 682 | 26.98% | 23 | 0.91% | 0 | 0.00% | 1,141 | 45.13% | 2,528 |
| Juab | 1,557 | 47.48% | 1,714 | 52.27% | 8 | 0.24% | 0 | 0.00% | -157 | -4.79% | 3,279 |
| Kane | 566 | 79.94% | 141 | 19.92% | 1 | 0.14% | 0 | 0.00% | 425 | 60.02% | 708 |
| Millard | 2,263 | 60.83% | 1,440 | 38.71% | 16 | 0.46% | 1 | 0.03% | 823 | 22.12% | 3,720 |
| Morgan | 513 | 53.00% | 454 | 46.90% | 1 | 0.10% | 0 | 0.00% | 59 | 6.10% | 968 |
| Piute | 434 | 64.20% | 237 | 35.06% | 5 | 0.74% | 0 | 0.00% | 197 | 29.14% | 676 |
| Rich | 470 | 67.72% | 224 | 32.28% | 0 | 0.00% | 0 | 0.00% | 246 | 35.44% | 694 |
| Salt Lake | 34,393 | 49.89% | 34,127 | 49.50% | 392 | 0.61% | 28 | 0.04% | 266 | 0.39% | 68,940 |
| San Juan | 449 | 65.55% | 231 | 33.72% | 5 | 0.73% | 0 | 0.00% | 218 | 31.83% | 685 |
| Sanpete | 3,694 | 59.63% | 2,482 | 40.06% | 19 | 0.31% | 0 | 0.00% | 1,212 | 19.57% | 6,195 |
| Sevier | 2,424 | 63.13% | 1,399 | 36.43% | 16 | 0.44% | 1 | 0.03% | 1,025 | 26.70% | 3,840 |
| Summit | 1,748 | 57.65% | 1,260 | 41.56% | 21 | 0.79% | 3 | 0.10% | 488 | 16.09% | 3,032 |
| Tooele | 1,707 | 54.22% | 1,421 | 45.14% | 18 | 0.64% | 2 | 0.06% | 286 | 9.08% | 3,148 |
| Uintah | 1,589 | 64.00% | 880 | 35.44% | 14 | 0.56% | 0 | 0.00% | 709 | 28.56% | 2,483 |
| Utah | 8,771 | 52.19% | 7,955 | 47.33% | 79 | 0.48% | 2 | 0.01% | 816 | 4.86% | 16,807 |
| Wasatch | 1,340 | 57.83% | 973 | 41.99% | 4 | 0.17% | 0 | 0.00% | 367 | 15.84% | 2,317 |
| Washington | 1,686 | 66.20% | 857 | 33.65% | 3 | 0.16% | 1 | 0.04% | 829 | 32.55% | 2,547 |
| Wayne | 422 | 68.17% | 195 | 31.50% | 2 | 0.32% | 0 | 0.00% | 227 | 36.67% | 619 |
| Weber | 9,934 | 53.79% | 8,361 | 45.27% | 168 | 0.94% | 5 | 0.03% | 1,573 | 8.52% | 18,468 |
| Totals | 94,618 | 53.58% | 80,985 | 45.86% | 954 | 0.54% | 46 | 0.03% | 13,633 | 7.72% | 176,603 |

==== Counties that flipped from Republican to Democratic ====
- Carbon
- Juab

== See also ==
- United States presidential elections in Utah
