= Salt Lake City metropolitan area =

Metropolitan area in Utah, United States

Coordinates: 40.7608°N 111.8910°W

Salt Lake City–Provo–Orem, UT–ID Combined Statistical Area
- Combined Statistical Area
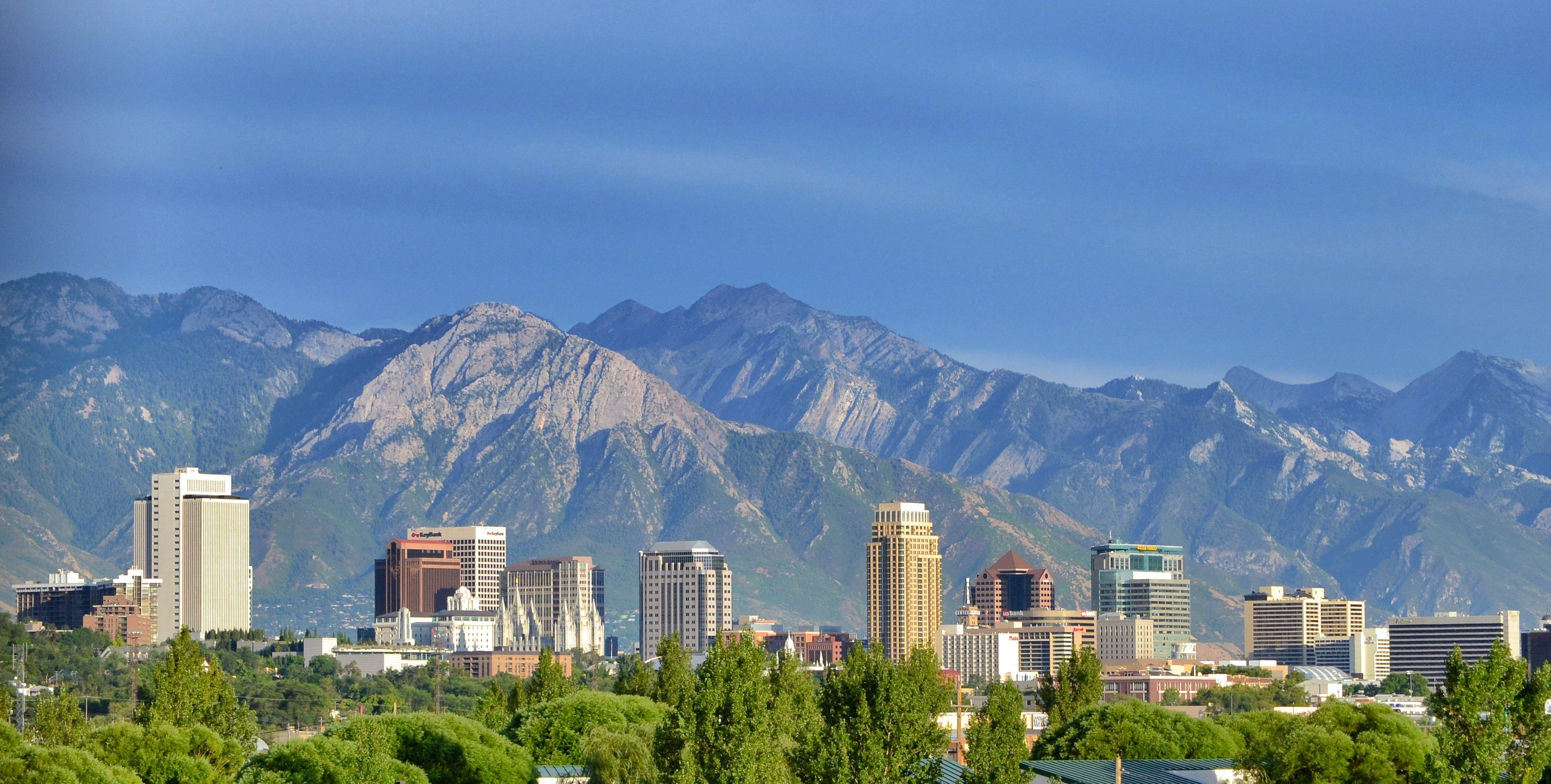
- Skyline of Downtown Salt Lake City
Map of Salt Lake City–Provo–Orem, UT–ID CSA
Salt Lake City–Murray, UT MSA
Provo–Orem–Lehi, UT MSA
Ogden, UT MSA
Heber, UT μSA
Brigham City, UT-ID μSA
- Country: United States
- State: Utah; Idaho
- Largest city: Salt Lake City
- Other principal cities: - West Valley City; - West Jordan; - Provo; - Orem; - Sandy; - Ogden; - Layton; - South Jordan; - Lehi; - Murray; - Clearfield; - Brigham City; - Heber City; - Park City

Area
  - Total: 9,980 sq mi (25,800 km^{2})

Population (2020 census)
  - Total: ▲1,257,936
  - Estimate (2026): 1,336,924 ▲
  - Density: 126/sq mi (49/km^{2})

GDP
  - Total: $215.338 billion (2022)
- Time zone: UTC−7 (MST)
  - Summer (DST): UTC−6 (MDT)

The Salt Lake City metropolitan area is the metropolitan area centered on the city of Salt Lake City, Utah. The Office of Management and Budget and the United States Census Bureau currently define the Salt Lake City, Utah Metropolitan Statistical Area (MSA) as comprising two counties: Salt Lake and Tooele. As of the 2020 census, the MSA had a population of 1,257,936. The Salt Lake City Metropolitan Area and the Ogden-Clearfield Metropolitan Area were a single metropolitan area known as the Salt Lake City-Ogden Metropolitan Area until being separated in 2005.

The metropolitan area is part of the Salt Lake City–Provo–Ogden, UT Combined Statistical Area (CSA), which also includes the Ogden–Clearfield metropolitan area, the Provo–Orem metropolitan area, the Heber City, Utah micropolitan area, and the Brigham City, Utah micropolitan area. As of the 2020 census, this CSA had a population of 2,701,129, comprising 82.6 percent of Utah's then 3,271,616 residents.

== Counties ==
- Salt Lake
- Tooele

== Communities ==
=== Incorporated places ===
- Alta
- Bluffdale (partial)
- Cottonwood Heights
- Draper (partial)
- Emigration Canyon
- Erda
- Grantsville
- Herriman
- Holladay
- Kearns
- Magna
- Midvale
- Millcreek
- Murray
- Ophir
- Riverton
- Rush Valley
- Salt Lake City
- Sandy
- South Jordan
- South Salt Lake
- Stockton
- Taylorsville
- Tooele
- Vernon
- Wendover
- West Jordan
- West Valley City
- White City

=== Unincorporated places ===
- Copperton (township)
- Dugway (census-designated place)
- Granite (census-designated place)
- Pine Canyon
- Snowbird
- Stansbury Park (census-designated place)

== Demographics ==
Historical population
Census	Pop.	Note	%±
1900	77,725		—
1910	131,426		69.1%
1920	159,282		21.2%
1930	194,102		21.9%
1940	211,625		9.0%
1950	274,895		29.9%
1960	406,576		47.9%
1970	486,031		19.5%
1980	655,297		34.8%
1990	768,075		17.2%
2000	968,858		26.1%
2010	1,124,197		16.0%
2020	1,257,936		11.9%
U.S. Decennial Census

As of the census of 2000, there were 968,858 people, 318,150 households, and 231,606 families residing within the MSA. The racial makeup of the MSA was 86.63% White, 1.04% African American, 0.90% Native American, 2.43% Asian, 1.15% Pacific Islander, 5.33% from other races, and 2.53% from two or more races. Hispanic or Latino of any race were 11.71% of the population.

The median income for a household in the MSA was $53,036, and the median income for a family was $59,139. Males had a median income of $40,683 versus $26,302 for females. The per capita income for the MSA was $23,426.

County	Seat	2025 estimate	2020 Census	Change	Area	Density
Salt Lake	Salt Lake City	1,220,916	1,185,238	+3.01%	807 sq mi (2,090 km^{2})	1,513/sq mi (584/km^{2})
Tooele	Tooele	87,461	72,698	+20.31%	7,286 sq mi (18,870 km^{2})	12/sq mi (5/km^{2})
Total		1,308,377	1,257,936	+4.01%	8,093 sq mi (20,960 km^{2})	162/sq mi (62/km^{2})

== Combined Statistical Area ==
The Salt Lake City–Provo–Orem Combined Statistical Area is made up of ten counties in northern Utah and one county in southern Idaho. The statistical area includes three metropolitan areas and two micropolitan areas.

- Metropolitan Statistical Areas (MSAs)
  - Salt Lake City MSA (Salt Lake and Tooele counties)
  - Ogden MSA (Davis, Morgan, and Weber counties)
  - Provo–Orem–Lehi MSA (Juab and Utah counties)
- Micropolitan Statistical Areas (μSAs)
  - Heber µSA (Summit and Wasatch counties)
  - Brigham City µSA (Box Elder County, Utah, and Oneida County, Idaho)

Statistical Area	2025 estimate	2020 Census	Change	Area	Density
Salt Lake City–Murray, UT Metropolitan Statistical Area	1,308,377	1,257,936	+4.01%	8,093 sq mi (20,960 km^{2})	162/sq mi (62/km^{2})
Provo–Orem–Lehi, UT Metropolitan Statistical Area	773,426	671,185	+15.23%	5,550 sq mi (14,400 km^{2})	139/sq mi (54/km^{2})
Ogden, UT Metropolitan Statistical Area	672,784	637,197	+5.58%	1,904 sq mi (4,930 km^{2})	353/sq mi (136/km^{2})
Heber, UT Micropolitan Statistical Area	81,655	77,145	+5.85%	3,088 sq mi (8,000 km^{2})	26/sq mi (10/km^{2})
Brigham City, UT-ID Micropolitan Statistical Area	70,405	62,230	+13.14%	7,931 sq mi (20,540 km^{2})	9/sq mi (3/km^{2})
Total	2,906,647	2,705,693	+7.43%	26,566 sq mi (68,810 km^{2})	109/sq mi (42/km^{2})

== See also ==
- Utah census statistical areas
- Salt Lake Valley
- Wasatch Front
