= Utah State Route 73 =

State highway in Utah, United States

State Route 73
- SR-73 highlighted in red

Route information
- Maintained by UDOT
- Length: 36.147 mi (58.173 km)
- Existed: 1933–present

Major junctions
- West end: SR-36 near Rush Valley
- SR-145 in Saratoga Springs; I-15 in Lehi
- East end: US 89 in Lehi

Location
- Country: United States
- State: Utah

Highway system
- Utah State Highway System; Interstate; US; State; Minor; Scenic
← SR-72	→ SR-74

State Route 73 (SR-73) is a 36.147-mile-long (58.173 km) state highway in the U.S. state of Utah, connecting the Rush, Cedar, and Utah Valleys. It is a discontinuous route in two segments; one long segment connecting SR-36 to Saratoga Springs, and one short segment within the city of Lehi.

== Route description ==
=== Western segment ===
SR-73 begins at an intersection with SR-36 in the Rush Valley, northeast of the town of the same name. It heads southeasterly, climbing slightly to the edge of the Oquirrh Mountains, and then curving between the south end of the range and the Deseret Chemical Depot. When the highway reaches Fivemile Pass, a wind gap between the Oquirrh Mountains and Thorpe Hills, it curves northeast, joining the historic Central Overland Trail (Pony Express route) through the pass and descending into the Cedar Valley. At Fairfield, SR-73 curves north, while the old trail continues its northeasterly path as Lehi-Fairfield Road. The route again curves northeast at Cedar Fort, crossing the valley and passing between the Lake Mountains and Traverse Mountains. The route begins descending into the Utah Valley, curving into Pioneer Crossing. The eastern terminus of the western segment occurs at the intersection of Pioneer Crossing and Mountain View Corridor, which is also the western terminus of SR-145 and the southern terminus of SR-85.

=== Eastern segment ===
The eastern segment begins in Lehi, at the intersection of 850 East and Main Street. The route proceeds east on Main Street, crossing Interstate 15 before coming to its eastern terminus at US-89.

== History ==
The state legislature defined State Route 73 in 1933, running from SR-68 (created in 1931) west of Lehi southwest via Cedar Fort, Fairfield and Topliff to SR-36. Up until Fivemile Pass, beyond Fairfield, this followed the present route of SR-73, but at Fivemile Pass the route curved southwesterly, generally following the former Fairfield Branch of the Union Pacific Railroad. Two years later, the portion west of Fairfield was dropped, in favor of a routing south from Fairfield to SR-26 (now US-6) near Eureka. State Route 180 was also created in 1935, beginning at SR-36 south of Stockton and heading east through Ophir Canyon to Ophir and southeast through the Oquirrh Mountains to Mercur. State Route 202 was defined in 1939 as an eastern approach to Mercur, splitting off SR-73 north of Fairfield and climbing Manning Canyon, and in 1941 the portion of SR-180 between Ophir and Mercur was removed from the state highway system, with an extension of SR-202 west down Mercur Canyon to SR-180 replacing it.

SR-73 was realigned again in 1945, turning southwest between Cedar Fort and Fairfield, absorbing the beginning of SR-202, and continuing southwest to a point between Fairfield and Fivemile Pass. The remainder of the route followed its present alignment to SR-36, replacing the portions of SR-202 and SR-180 that lay outside the canyons in the Rush Valley. The part of former SR-73 from Fairfield north to the junction south of Cedar Fort became State Route 191, while the part south of Fairfield was given to the county. SR-202 was cut back to only the portion in Mercur Canyon, with the Manning Canyon piece dropped. Finally, a connection from the Deseret Chemical Depot north to SR-73 near its west end, constructed with federal aid in 1942, was numbered State Route 198. In short, SR-73 now connected SR-36 to SR-68, with four spurs from west to east: SR-198 to the chemical depot, SR-180 to Ophir, SR-202 to Mercur, and SR-191 to Fairfield.

Over the next two decades, all four spurs disappeared. The first two to go were SR-191 and SR-202, both eliminated in 1953. This completely removed Mercur from the state highway system, but Fairfield was kept by moving SR-73 to its current alignment through that community. SR-180 was eliminated in 1961, and SR-198 was deleted in 1969. Due to a southerly extension of SR-68 in 1960, splitting at the SR-73 intersection, the portion of SR-68 into Lehi was renumbered as an extension of SR-73, which gained its current length at that time.

In 2011, in conjunction with the building of the Pioneer Crossing (SR-145) extension, the segment on Crossroads Boulevard between SR-68 and 850 East in Lehi was removed from the state highway system, which made SR-73 a discontinuous route. The route was further relinquished in 2015, with the segment between SR-68 and SR-145 turned back to the city of Saratoga Springs.

== Major intersections ==
County	Location	mi	km	Destinations	Notes
Tooele		0.000	0.000	SR-36	Western terminus
Tooele		3.422	5.507	Stark Road	Former SR-198
Tooele		4.607	7.414	Ophir Canyon Road	Former SR-180
Tooele		15.647	25.181	Railroad Bed Road	Former SR-73
Utah	Fairfield	20.497	32.987	18150 West	Former SR-73
Utah	Saratoga Springs	35.419	57.001	SR-85 north (Mountain View Corridor)	Eastern terminus of western segment
Utah	Saratoga Springs	Gap in route			
Utah	Lehi	35.419	57.001	850 East	Western terminus of eastern segment
Utah	Lehi	35.713– 35.821	57.475– 57.648	I-15 – Salt Lake, Las Vegas	Interchange
Utah	Lehi	36.102	58.101	US 89 (State Street)	Eastern terminus
Utah	1.000 mi = 1.609 km; 1.000 km = 0.621 mi				
