= Rowley industrial area =

Industrial area in the state of Utah, United States

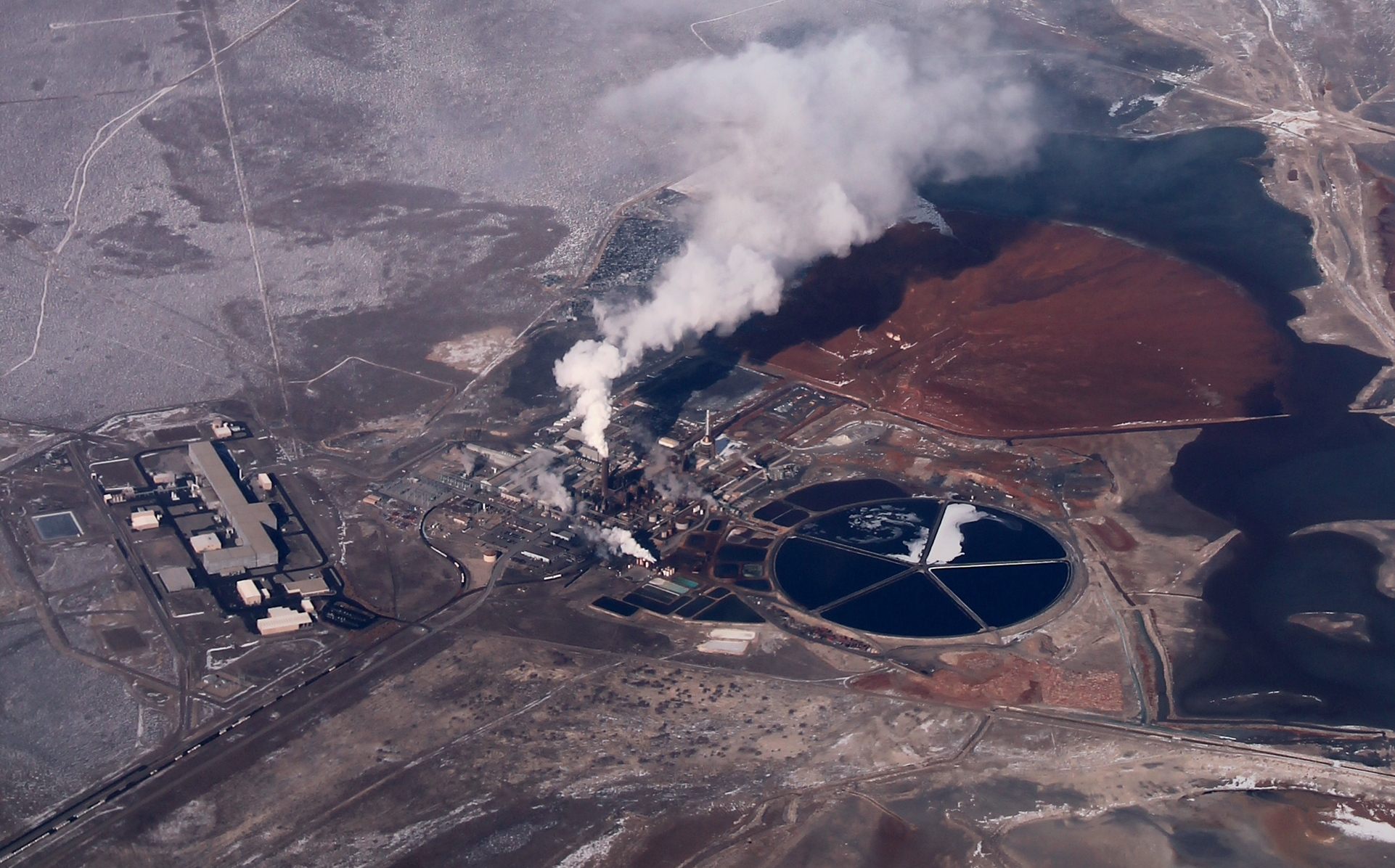
- Aerial view of the US Magnesium plant in Rowley
- Coordinates: 40°54′10″N 112°46′27″W

Rowley is an industrial area in Tooele County, Utah, United States. Rowley sits on the western shore of the Great Salt Lake, approximately 15 miles (by road) north of I-80, Exit 77, serving Timpie/Rowley Junction.

Rowley was created in 1970 as the site of a large magnesium processing plant. The location was named after Jeff Rowley who was the CEO of National Lead Industries during the construction of the plant. In the mid-70s, National Lead Industries changed its name to NL Industries and in 1980 sold the plant to AMAX. In 1989, the facility was sold to the Renco Group, and the facility renamed Magnesium Corporation of America a.k.a. Magcorp.

This facility was identified by the EPA as a major air polluter in the 1990s and has been identified as a significant emitter of chlorine and bromine in the atmosphere. In 2001, Magcorp went bankrupt and the Renco group purchased the assets and formed US Magnesium. In 2005, the facility was investigated by the CDC for worker health hazards.

In 2006, Allegheny Technologies announced plans to build a titanium smelter at Rowley, budgeted at $325 million. The smelter was built adjacent to the US Magnesium plant. The plant came online in 2012 and cost $460 million. By September 2016, the smelter was idled because the metal could be procured on the market at a cost lower than the production cost at ATI.
