= 1956 United States presidential election in Utah =

- November 6, 1956

Nominee	Dwight D. Eisenhower	Adlai Stevenson
Party	Republican	Democratic
Home state	Pennsylvania (Note: Although he was born in Texas and grew up in Kansas before his military career, at the time of the 1952 election Eisenhower was president of Columbia University and was, officially, a resident of New York. During his first term as president, he moved his private residence to Gettysburg, Pennsylvania, and officially changed his residency to Pennsylvania.)	Illinois
Running mate	Richard Nixon	Estes Kefauver
Electoral vote	4	0
Popular vote	215,631	118,364
Percentage	64.56%	35.44%
County results
Eisenhower
50–60%
60–70%
70–80%
90–100%
President before election
Dwight D. Eisenhower
Republican
Elected President
Dwight D. Eisenhower
Republican

The 1956 United States presidential election in Utah took place on November 6, 1956, as part of the 1956 United States presidential election. State voters chose four representatives, or electors, to the Electoral College, who voted for president and vice president.

Utah was won by incumbent President Dwight D. Eisenhower (R–Pennsylvania), running with Vice President Richard Nixon, with 64.56 percent of the popular vote, against Adlai Stevenson (D–Illinois), running with Senator Estes Kefauver, with 35.44 percent of the popular vote. Utah swung over 11 points toward Eisenhower compared to 1952. This was by far the largest Republican swing of any state in the western half of the country.

== Results ==
1956 United States presidential election in Utah
Party	Candidate	Votes	%
Republican	Dwight D. Eisenhower (inc.)	215,631	64.56%
Democratic	Adlai Stevenson	118,364	35.44%
Total votes		333,995	100.00%

=== Results by county ===
County	Dwight D. Eisenhower Republican		Adlai Stevenson Democratic		Margin		Total votes cast
County	#	%	#	%	#	%	Total votes cast
Beaver	1,190	53.60%	1,030	46.40%	160	7.20%	2,220
Box Elder	5,804	68.34%	2,689	31.66%	3,115	36.68%	8,493
Cache	10,349	73.82%	3,671	26.18%	6,678	47.64%	14,020
Carbon	4,507	50.26%	4,460	49.74%	47	0.52%	8,967
Daggett	102	53.13%	90	46.88%	12	6.25%	192
Davis	12,122	66.71%	6,050	33.29%	6,072	33.42%	18,172
Duchesne	1,856	67.99%	874	32.01%	982	35.98%	2,730
Emery	1,679	64.04%	943	35.96%	736	28.08%	2,622
Garfield	1,115	75.95%	353	24.05%	762	51.90%	1,468
Grand	1,044	76.09%	328	23.91%	716	52.18%	1,372
Iron	3,321	71.70%	1,311	28.30%	2,010	43.40%	4,632
Juab	1,512	59.60%	1,025	40.40%	487	19.20%	2,537
Kane	939	90.20%	102	9.80%	837	80.40%	1,041
Millard	2,667	69.09%	1,193	30.91%	1,474	38.18%	3,860
Morgan	905	67.39%	438	32.61%	467	34.78%	1,343
Piute	548	75.27%	180	24.73%	368	50.54%	728
Rich	561	68.92%	253	31.08%	308	37.84%	814
Salt Lake	95,179	64.22%	53,038	35.78%	42,141	28.44%	148,217
San Juan	1,119	72.47%	425	27.53%	694	44.94%	1,544
Sanpete	3,883	68.59%	1,778	31.41%	2,105	37.18%	5,661
Sevier	3,646	74.74%	1,232	25.26%	2,414	49.48%	4,878
Summit	2,031	69.77%	880	30.23%	1,151	39.54%	2,911
Tooele	3,390	55.82%	2,683	44.18%	707	11.64%	6,073
Uintah	2,840	77.60%	820	22.40%	2,020	55.20%	3,660
Utah	25,371	66.56%	12,747	33.44%	12,624	33.12%	38,118
Wasatch	1,738	66.79%	864	33.21%	874	33.58%	2,602
Washington	3,172	78.34%	877	21.66%	2,295	56.68%	4,049
Wayne	499	63.81%	283	36.19%	216	27.62%	782
Weber	22,542	55.95%	17,747	44.05%	4,795	11.90%	40,289
Totals	215,631	64.56%	118,364	35.44%	97,267	29.12%	333,995

==== Counties that flipped from Democratic to Republican ====
- Carbon
- Tooele

== See also ==
- United States presidential elections in Utah
