= Clive Disposal Site =

Unincorporated community in Utah, US

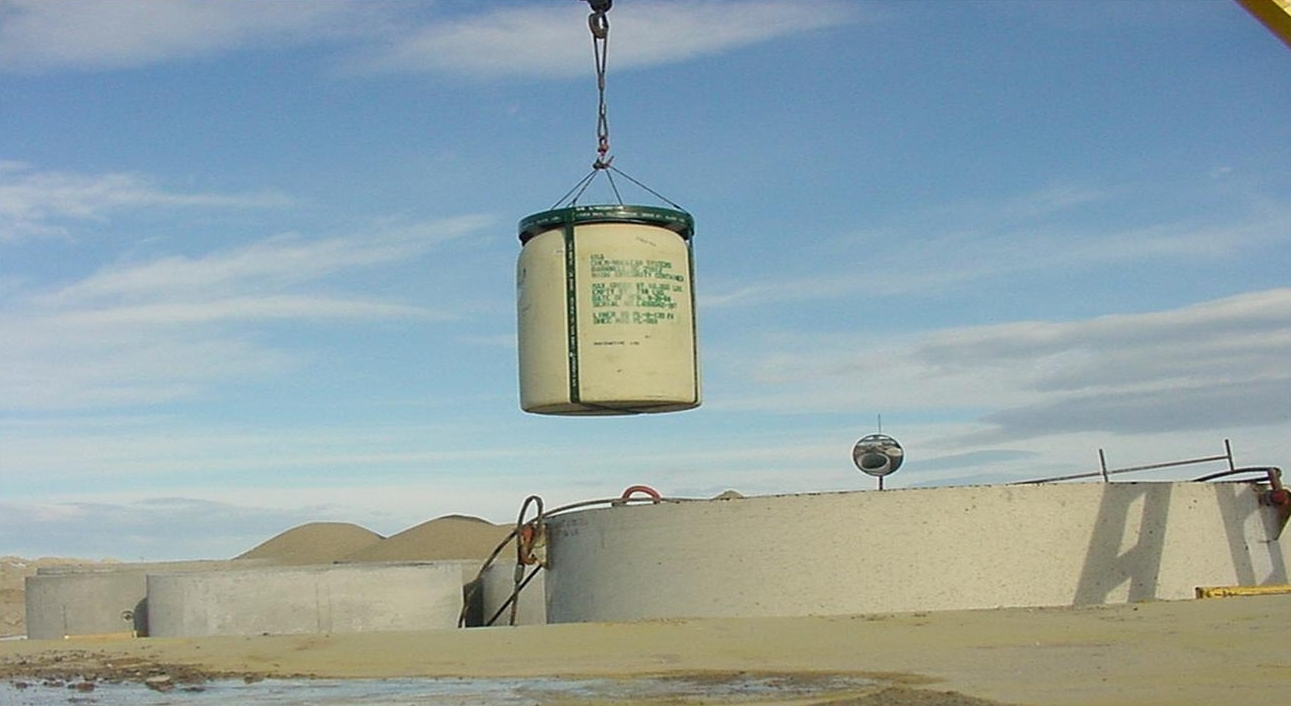
- Class A Radioactive Waste disposal at Clive Disposal Site
- Coordinates: 40°42′31″N 113°07′03″W

The Clive Disposal Site is the site of a radioactive waste storage facility currently operated by EnergySolutions in Clive, Utah, an unincorporated community of Tooele County. It is located in the western portion of the state, close to the Dugway Proving Grounds. The site accepts depleted uranium, a material that takes millions of years to decay, and therefore requires special precautions and regulations.

== History ==
The facility was built and operated by Envirocare from 1988 until its merger into EnergySolutions in 2007. Most of the radioactive waste from the decommissioning of the San Onofre Nuclear Generating Station is going to the Energy Solutions facility in Clive, Utah, and is being transported by rail.

In 2020, major pieces of the San Onofre plant were transferred from rail to be moved by platform trailer trucks along 400 miles of highway. The 670-ton load was the heaviest ever hauled by road in the state of Nevada.

== Operation ==
EnergySolutions sought permission in 2011 from the State of Utah for its "Semprasafe" process to blend, or dilute, the currently allowed Class A low-level radioactive waste with more radioactive Class B and Class C wastes until it just meets the Class A waste levels its license allows per container at its Clive disposal site. Some estimates projected that this could increase Energy Solutions' Utah site total of 7,450 curies of radiation per annum (2010), to an additional 19,184 to 28,470 curies each year. The Division of Radiation Control of Utah considered, but rejected blending to allow Class B and Class C waste into Utah. This would have made Utah, after Texas, the second state in the US to allow the importation of Class B and C radioactive wastes.

In 2015, the State of Utah started making plans to bring the site closer to taking 250,000 tons of radioactive waste. A compromise bill was reached that allowed depleted uranium to be accepted into the state as a Class A material, despite it eventually growing in radioactivity to exceed Class C standards. In 2019, despite some calls for a veto, it was passed by Utah Governor Gary Herbert.
