= Rush Lake (Tooele County, Utah) =

Lake in the state of Utah, United States

- Rush Reservoir
- Location within Utah Location within the United States
- Location: Tooele County, Utah
- Coordinates: 40°26′28″N 112°23′04″W
- Type: Endorheic
- Primary outflows: None
- Basin countries: United States (Rush-Tooele Valleys Watershed)
- Surface area: 5 mi^{2} (13 km^{2})
- Max. depth: 20 feet (6.1 m)
- Surface elevation: 4,951 ft (1,509 m)
- Frozen: never
- Islands: Depends on lake level
- Settlements: Stockton, Tooele, Rush Valley

Rush Lake (also known as Rush Reservoir) is a shallow saline lake in Tooele County in the U.S. state of Utah. It is a remnant of Lake Bonneville, an ancient postglacial inland sea that covered much of the western United States during the Ice Ages. The lake is a natural impoundment of a stream that drains into the Great Salt Lake. Rush Lake varies in size, evaporating at about 2 feet (0.61 m) per year, although occasional floods refill the lake. The average surface elevation is 4,951 feet (1,509 m).

== Geography ==
The lake is located in a broad valley named Rush Valley near the town of Stockton and several miles south of Tooele, and is fed by snowmelt from six mountain ranges. These are the Sheeprock Mountains in the south, the East Tintic Mountains to the southeast, the Oquirrh Mountains to the east, South Mountain to the north, the Stansbury Mountains to the northwest and west, and the Onaqui Mountains to the southwest. The runoff from these mountain regions create only intermittent surface flow to the lake, but does reach it via groundwater seepage. The highest point in the watershed is Lowe Peak, at 10,590 feet (3,230 m). The outflow mostly consists of evaporation, and a very small amount seeps through the sandspit that impounds it from the main Great Salt Lake valley.

The lake was isolated from Lake Bonneville approximately 15,000-17,000 years ago after evaporation lowered the lake level to below the natural Stockton Bar barrier between Rush Valley and Tooele Valley. During the ice ages, Rush Valley was merely one of many arms of Lake Bonneville. After Bonneville dried up, Rush Valley contained several pluvial lakes – Shambip, Smelter, and Rush – of which only Rush Lake remains today.

== Climate and ecology ==
Two major vegetation communities inhabit the Rush Lake watershed. These are sagebrush-grass and pinyon-juniper. The former is found in lower elevations and the valley floor, and the latter is found at higher elevations on the mountains along with other forms of alpine vegetation. The average annual precipitation is 10 to 40 inches (250 to 1,020 mm), and the annual frost-free season surrounding the lake ranges from 100 to 140 days. Cattle and sheep rangelands take up most of the catchment area.

The lake is inhabited by several different species of fish. These include, in order of abundance, Utah chub, carp, green sunfish, bluegill, largemouth bass, channel catfish, yellow perch, black crappie, and black bullhead. The lake has not been stocked with fish since 1988, when 71,000 largemouth bass fry were released in the lake.
