= Rush Valley, Utah =

Town in the state of Utah, United States

- Town
- Location in Tooele County and the state of Utah

- Location of Utah in the United States
- Coordinates: 40°22′45″N 112°26′50″W
- Country: United States
- State: Utah
- County: Tooele
- District: UT-2
- Settled: 1856
- Incorporated (Onaqui): 1934
- Incorporated (Rush Valley): February 22, 1972
- Named for: Rush Lake

Area
  - Total: 18.08 sq mi (46.83 km^{2})
  - Land: 18.08 sq mi (46.83 km^{2})
  - Water: 0 sq mi (0.00 km^{2})
- Elevation: 5,046 ft (1,538 m)

Population (2020)
  - Total: 431
  - Density: 23.8/sq mi (9.20/km^{2})
- Time zone: UTC-7 (Mountain (MST))
  - Summer (DST): UTC-6 (MDT)
- ZIP code: 84069
- Area code: 435
- FIPS code: 49-65240
- GNIS feature ID: 2412585
- Website: rushvalley.utah.gov

Rush Valley is a town in Tooele County, Utah, United States, located in the northwest of Rush Valley. It is part of the Salt Lake City, Utah Metropolitan Statistical Area. As of the 2020 census, Rush Valley had a population of 431.

== Geography ==
According to the United States Census Bureau, the town has a total area of 18.3 square miles (47.5 km^{2}), all land.

=== Climate ===
According to the Köppen Climate Classification system, Rush Valley has a semi-arid climate, abbreviated "BSk" on climate maps.

== History ==
This area was first settled beginning in 1856. In 1934, a large area of some 33 square miles (85 km^{2}), comprising the settlements of Clover, St. John, and Vernon, was incorporated into a town called Onaqui. The incorporation was essentially a bureaucratic tactic to secure federal aid for development of municipal infrastructure, including from the Rural Electrification Administration. When the people of Vernon were granted a petition to incorporate separately on February 22, 1972, the remaining town was renamed Rush Valley.

== Demographics ==
Historical population
Census	Pop.	Note	%±
1940	374		—
1950	333		−11.0%
1960	511		53.5%
1970	541		5.9%
1980	356		−34.2%
1990	339		−4.8%
2000	453		33.6%
2010	447		−1.3%
2020	431		−3.6%
U.S. Decennial Census

As of the census of 2000, there were 453 people, 149 households, and 123 families residing in the town. The population density was 24.7 people per square mile (9.5/km^{2}). There were 169 housing units at an average density of 9.2 per square mile (3.6/km^{2}). The racial makeup of the town was 98.01% White, 0.22% Native American, 0.22% Pacific Islander, 0.66% from other races, and 0.88% from two or more races. Hispanic or Latino of any race were 1.10% of the population.

There were 149 households, out of which 34.9% had children under the age of 18 living with them, 71.8% were married couples living together, 7.4% had a female householder with no husband present, and 16.8% were non-families. 12.8% of all households were made up of individuals, and 4.7% had someone living alone who was 65 years of age or older. The average household size was 3.04 and the average family size was 3.34.

In the town, the population was spread out, with 26.9% under the age of 18, 10.8% from 18 to 24, 24.5% from 25 to 44, 24.9% from 45 to 64, and 12.8% who were 65 years of age or older. The median age was 38 years. For every 100 females, there were 102.2 males. For every 100 females age 18 and over, there were 106.9 males.

The median income for a household in the town was $46,875, and the median income for a family was $48,036. Males had a median income of $41,136 versus $22,813 for females. The per capita income for the town was $14,661. About 7.1% of families and 10.4% of the population were below the poverty line, including 15.4% of those under age 18 and 8.3% of those age 65 or over.
