= Lofgreen, Utah =

Unincorporated community in the state of Utah, United States

Lofgreen
- Unincorporated community
- Location in Utah
- Coordinates: 40°01′27″N 112°18′38″W
- Country: United States
- State: Utah
- County: Tooele
- Named for: Herman Lofgren
- Elevation: 5,794 ft (1,766 m)
- GNIS feature ID: 1442837

Lofgreen is an unincorporated community in Tooele County, Utah, United States.

== History ==
Lofgreen was settled in 1898, named for its first settler and inhabitant, Herman Lofgren. Lofgreen was settled alongside the Union Pacific Railroad track heading south from Lake Point. Early residents built a small schoolhouse. Many residents worked as section hands for the railroad. The discovery of creosote led Lofgreen's population to plummet, as the new discovery greatly reduced the demand for section hands.

In July 2020, Lofgreen was the site of the murder of a horse, part of a larger statewide trend of livestock shootings.

== Geography ==
Lofgreen is located 5,790 feet (1,760 meters) above sea level. The town lies within the Mountain Time Zone and uses the (435) area code. Nearby communities include Vernon, Faust, Tintic Junction, Eureka, Mammoth, and Fairfield.
