= 1952 United States presidential election in Utah =

- November 4, 1952

Nominee	Dwight D. Eisenhower	Adlai Stevenson
Party	Republican	Democratic
Home state	New York	Illinois
Running mate	Richard Nixon	John Sparkman
Electoral vote	4	0
Popular vote	194,190	135,364
Percentage	58.93%	41.07%
County results
Eisenhower
50–60%
60–70%
70–80%
80–90%
Stevenson
50–60%
60–70%
President before election
Harry S. Truman
Democratic
Elected President
Dwight D. Eisenhower
Republican

The 1952 United States presidential election in Utah took place on November 4, 1952, as part of the 1952 United States presidential election. State voters chose four representatives, or electors, to the Electoral College, who voted for President and Vice-president.

Utah was won by Columbia University President Dwight D. Eisenhower (R–New York), running with Senator Richard Nixon, with 58.93 percent of the popular vote, against Adlai Stevenson (D–Illinois), running with Senator John Sparkman, with 41.07 percent of the popular vote. This was the first time since 1928 that Utah backed a Republican in a presidential election.

== Results ==
1952 United States presidential election in Utah
Party	Candidate	Votes	%
Republican	Dwight D. Eisenhower	194,190	58.93%
Democratic	Adlai Stevenson	135,364	41.07%
Total votes		329,554	100.00%

=== Results by county ===
County	Dwight D. Eisenhower Republican		Adlai Stevenson Democratic		Margin		Total votes cast
County	#	%	#	%	#	%	Total votes cast
Beaver	1,277	55.16%	1,038	44.84%	239	10.32%	2,315
Box Elder	5,850	66.22%	2,984	33.78%	2,866	32.44%	8,834
Cache	10,167	70.56%	4,242	29.44%	5,925	41.12%	14,409
Carbon	3,770	39.44%	5,790	60.56%	-2,020	-21.12%	9,560
Daggett	90	51.14%	86	48.86%	4	2.28%	176
Davis	9,067	60.34%	5,960	39.66%	3,107	20.68%	15,027
Duchesne	1,969	61.32%	1,242	38.68%	727	22.64%	3,211
Emery	1,552	56.79%	1,181	43.21%	371	13.58%	2,733
Garfield	1,065	69.07%	477	30.93%	588	38.14%	1,542
Grand	675	72.27%	259	27.73%	416	44.54%	934
Iron	3,175	66.55%	1,596	33.45%	1,579	33.10%	4,771
Juab	1,711	58.72%	1,203	41.28%	508	17.44%	2,914
Kane	943	85.19%	164	14.81%	779	70.38%	1,107
Millard	2,994	69.74%	1,299	30.26%	1,695	39.48%	4,293
Morgan	862	64.86%	467	35.14%	395	29.72%	1,329
Piute	531	71.95%	207	28.05%	324	43.90%	738
Rich	569	69.39%	251	30.61%	318	38.78%	820
Salt Lake	84,176	58.60%	59,470	41.40%	24,706	17.20%	143,646
San Juan	876	67.54%	421	32.46%	455	35.08%	1,297
Sanpete	4,146	65.12%	2,221	34.88%	1,925	30.24%	6,367
Sevier	3,996	73.44%	1,445	26.56%	2,551	46.88%	5,441
Summit	1,955	60.75%	1,263	39.25%	692	21.50%	3,218
Tooele	3,209	47.68%	3,521	52.32%	-312	-4.64%	6,730
Uintah	2,806	71.18%	1,136	28.82%	1,670	42.36%	3,942
Utah	20,913	57.71%	15,327	42.29%	5,586	15.42%	36,240
Wasatch	1,677	63.40%	968	36.60%	709	26.80%	2,645
Washington	2,941	73.21%	1,076	26.79%	1,865	46.42%	4,017
Wayne	536	66.09%	275	33.91%	261	32.18%	811
Weber	20,692	51.11%	19,795	48.89%	897	2.22%	40,487
Totals	194,190	58.93%	135,364	41.07%	58,826	17.86%	329,554

==== Counties that flipped from Democratic to Republican ====
- Beaver
- Daggett
- Davis
- Duchesne
- Emery
- Juab
- Morgan
- Salt Lake
- Uintah
- Utah
- Wayne
- Wasatch
- Weber

== See also ==
- United States presidential elections in Utah
