= Pine Canyon, Utah =

Unincorporated community in the state of Utah, United States

Pine Canyon Lincoln
- Township
- Location within Utah Location within the United States
- Coordinates: 40.56282°N 112.25666°W
- Country: United States
- State: Utah
- County: Tooele
- Founded: 1876
- Named for: Pine Canyon
- Elevation: 4,917 ft (1,499 m)
- Time zone: UTC-7 (Mountain (MST))
  - Summer (DST): UTC-6 (MDT)
- ZIP code: 84074
- Area code: 435

Pine Canyon, also known as Lincoln, is a township in Tooele County, Utah, United States. It was established in 1876 at the mouth of Pine Canyon, which is what gave the community its name. A post office was formerly present but, has since been turned into a house bakery.
