= Utah State Route 36 =

State highway in Utah, United States

State Route 36

Route information
- Maintained by UDOT
- Length: 66.406 mi (106.870 km)
- Existed: 1910 as a state highway; 1927 as SR-36–present

Major junctions
- South end: US 6 near Eureka
- SR-199 near Rush Valley; SR-73 near Stockton; SR-112 in Tooele
- North end: I-80 at Lake Point

Location
- Country: United States
- State: Utah

Highway system
- Utah State Highway System; Interstate; US; State; Minor; Scenic
| ← SR-35 | → SR-37 |

State Route 36 (SR-36) is a highway in northern Utah connecting US-6 in northern Juab County to I-80 in northern Tooele County.

== Route description ==
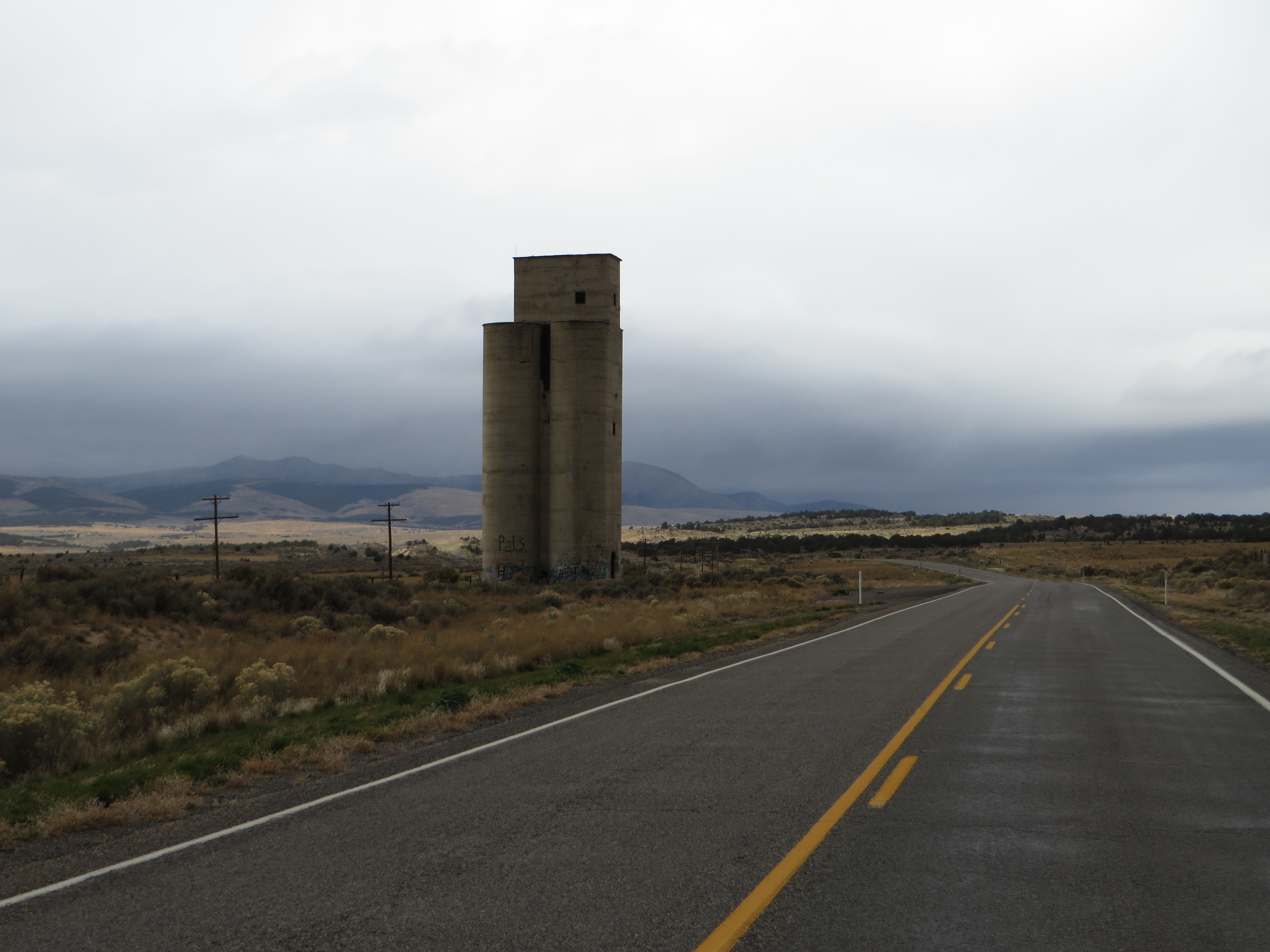
SR-36 between Eureka and Vernon

From its southern terminus west of Eureka, SR-36 heads northwest until Vernon, where it turns north. It continues this general direction, eventually heading more to the northeast, until the northern terminus at Lake Point, where it intersects Interstate 80.

From the junction with SR-73 north to the terminus at I-80, SR-36 is included as part of the National Highway System.

== History ==
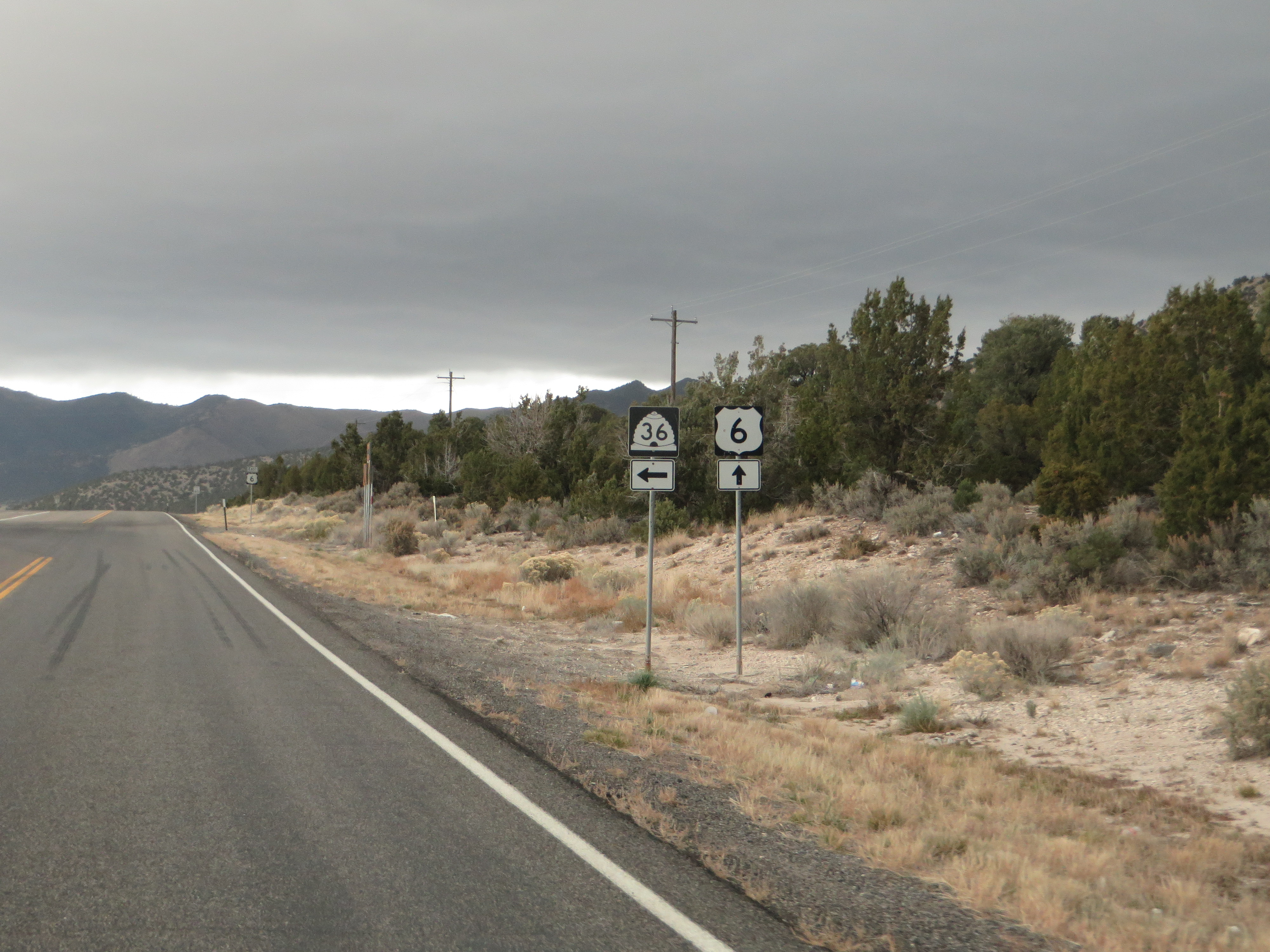
US-6 approaching junction with SR-36

The road from SR-4 (by 1926 US-40, now SR-138) at Mills Junction south to Clover, forming part of the Lincoln Highway, was added to the state highway system in 1910 (Mills Junction to Tooele) and 1912 (Tooele to Clover). A 1925 law extended it south from Saint John Station (northeast of Clover) to Tintic Junction, and in 1927 the state legislature assigned the SR-36 designation to the route from Mills Junction to Tooele Junction, as well as the spur to Clover until 1931, when it became SR-58. Coinciding with the eventual construction of I-80 through the area, SR-36 was extended north from its northern terminus at US-40 to its eventual interchange with I-80 at Lake Point in 1965. The south leg of the triangular intersection at Tintic Junction was designated State Route 67 by the legislature in 1975, only to be changed back to a spur of SR-36 in 1991 because of motorist confusion.

== Major intersections ==
| County | Location | mi | km | Destinations | Notes |
|---|---|---|---|---|---|
| Juab | Eureka | 0.036 | 0.058 | US 6 – Delta, Santaquin | Southern terminus |
| Tooele | Rush Valley | 38.763 | 62.383 | SR-199 west – Dugway | Eastern terminus of SR-199 |
| Tooele | Rush Valley | 42.557 | 68.489 | SR-73 east – Lehi | Western Terminus of SR-73 |
| Tooele | Tooele | 54.610 | 87.886 | SR-112 west (1000 North Street) – Grantsville | Eastern Terminus of SR-112 |
| Tooele | Lake Point | 65.914– 66.406 | 106.078– 106.870 | I-80 – Wendover, Salt Lake City | Northern terminus; I-80 exit 99 |
| Tooele | 1.000 mi = 1.609 km; 1.000 km = 0.621 mi | | | | |
