= 1972 United States presidential election in Utah =

- November 7, 1972

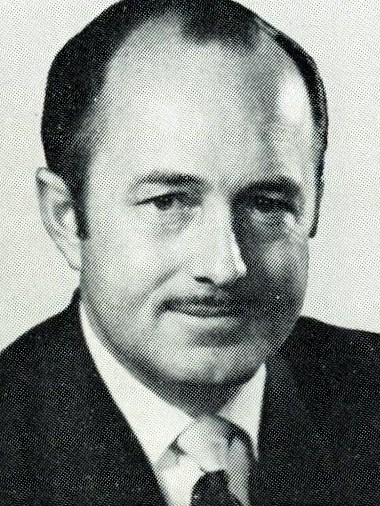
Nominee	Richard Nixon	George McGovern	John G. Schmitz
Party	Republican	Democratic	American Independent
Home state	California	South Dakota	California
Running mate	Spiro Agnew	Sargent Shriver	Thomas J. Anderson
Electoral vote	4	0	0
Popular vote	323,643	126,284	28,549
Percentage	67.64%	26.39%	5.97%
County results
Nixon
50–60%
60–70%
70–80%
80–90%
President before election
Richard Nixon
Republican
Elected President
Richard Nixon
Republican

The 1972 United States presidential election in Utah took place on November 7, 1972, as part of the 1972 United States presidential election. Voters chose four representatives, or electors to the Electoral College, who voted for president and vice president.

Utah overwhelmingly voted for incumbent President Richard Nixon (R-California) with over 67 percent of the popular vote, beating Democratic South Dakota Senator George McGovern with a margin of over forty percent, carrying every county in the state. Nixon carried every county with over sixty percent of the vote except for Carbon County, which had typically been the most Democratic area of the state. This occurred even as incumbent Democratic Governor Cal Rampton won reelection with nearly 70% of the vote on the same ballot. U.S. Representative John G. Schmitz (R-California) of the American Independent Party received 5.97 percent of the popular vote, and his results in Utah proved to be his third strongest state in the 1972 election after Idaho and Alaska.

== Results ==
1972 United States presidential election in Utah
Party	Candidate	Votes	%
Republican	Richard Nixon (inc.)	323,643	67.64%
Democratic	George McGovern	126,284	26.39%
American Independent	John G. Schmitz	28,549	5.97%
Total votes		478,476	100.00%

=== Results by county ===
County	Richard Nixon Republican		George McGovern Democratic		John G. Schmitz American Independent		Margin		Total votes cast
County	#	%	#	%	#	%	#	%	Total votes cast
Beaver	1,332	64.88%	682	33.22%	39	1.90%	650	31.66%	2,053
Box Elder	9,880	77.22%	2,134	16.68%	780	6.10%	7,746	60.54%	12,794
Cache	16,538	76.83%	4,018	18.67%	969	4.50%	12,520	58.16%	21,525
Carbon	3,956	53.19%	3,335	44.84%	147	1.98%	621	8.35%	7,438
Daggett	204	72.86%	50	17.86%	26	9.29%	154	55.00%	280
Davis	29,706	72.61%	7,954	19.44%	3,251	7.95%	21,752	53.17%	40,911
Duchesne	2,183	70.49%	629	20.31%	285	9.20%	1,554	50.18%	3,097
Emery	1,666	65.33%	769	30.16%	115	4.51%	897	35.17%	2,550
Garfield	1,290	80.47%	242	15.10%	71	4.43%	1,048	65.37%	1,603
Grand	1,837	72.15%	560	22.00%	149	5.85%	1,277	50.15%	2,546
Iron	5,085	76.49%	1,098	16.52%	465	6.99%	3,987	59.97%	6,648
Juab	1,629	67.06%	691	28.45%	109	4.49%	938	38.61%	2,429
Kane	1,146	78.82%	218	14.99%	90	6.19%	928	63.83%	1,454
Millard	2,689	70.48%	777	20.37%	349	9.15%	1,912	50.11%	3,815
Morgan	1,456	71.51%	363	17.83%	217	10.66%	1,093	53.68%	2,036
Piute	475	78.77%	102	16.92%	26	4.31%	373	61.85%	603
Rich	604	79.58%	120	15.81%	35	4.61%	484	63.77%	759
Salt Lake	132,066	62.99%	68,489	32.67%	9,111	4.35%	63,577	30.32%	209,666
San Juan	1,893	68.27%	677	24.41%	203	7.32%	1,216	43.86%	2,773
Sanpete	3,995	70.68%	1,220	21.59%	437	7.73%	2,775	49.09%	5,652
Sevier	3,700	72.96%	820	16.17%	551	10.87%	2,880	56.79%	5,071
Summit	2,209	69.95%	836	26.47%	113	3.58%	1,373	43.48%	3,158
Tooele	5,641	66.02%	2,621	30.67%	283	3.31%	3,020	35.35%	8,545
Uintah	4,712	80.30%	716	12.20%	440	7.50%	3,996	68.10%	5,868
Utah	42,179	70.94%	10,828	18.21%	6,453	10.85%	31,351	52.73%	59,460
Wasatch	2,046	70.21%	693	23.78%	175	6.01%	1,353	46.43%	2,914
Washington	5,176	77.69%	956	14.35%	530	7.96%	4,220	63.34%	6,662
Wayne	597	71.75%	183	22.00%	52	6.25%	414	49.75%	832
Weber	37,753	68.23%	14,503	26.21%	3,078	5.56%	23,250	42.02%	55,334
Totals	323,643	67.64%	126,284	26.39%	28,549	5.97%	197,359	41.25%	478,476

==== Counties that flipped from Democratic to Republican ====
- Carbon
- Tooele

== See also ==
- United States presidential elections in Utah
