= 1920 United States presidential election in Utah =

- November 2, 1920
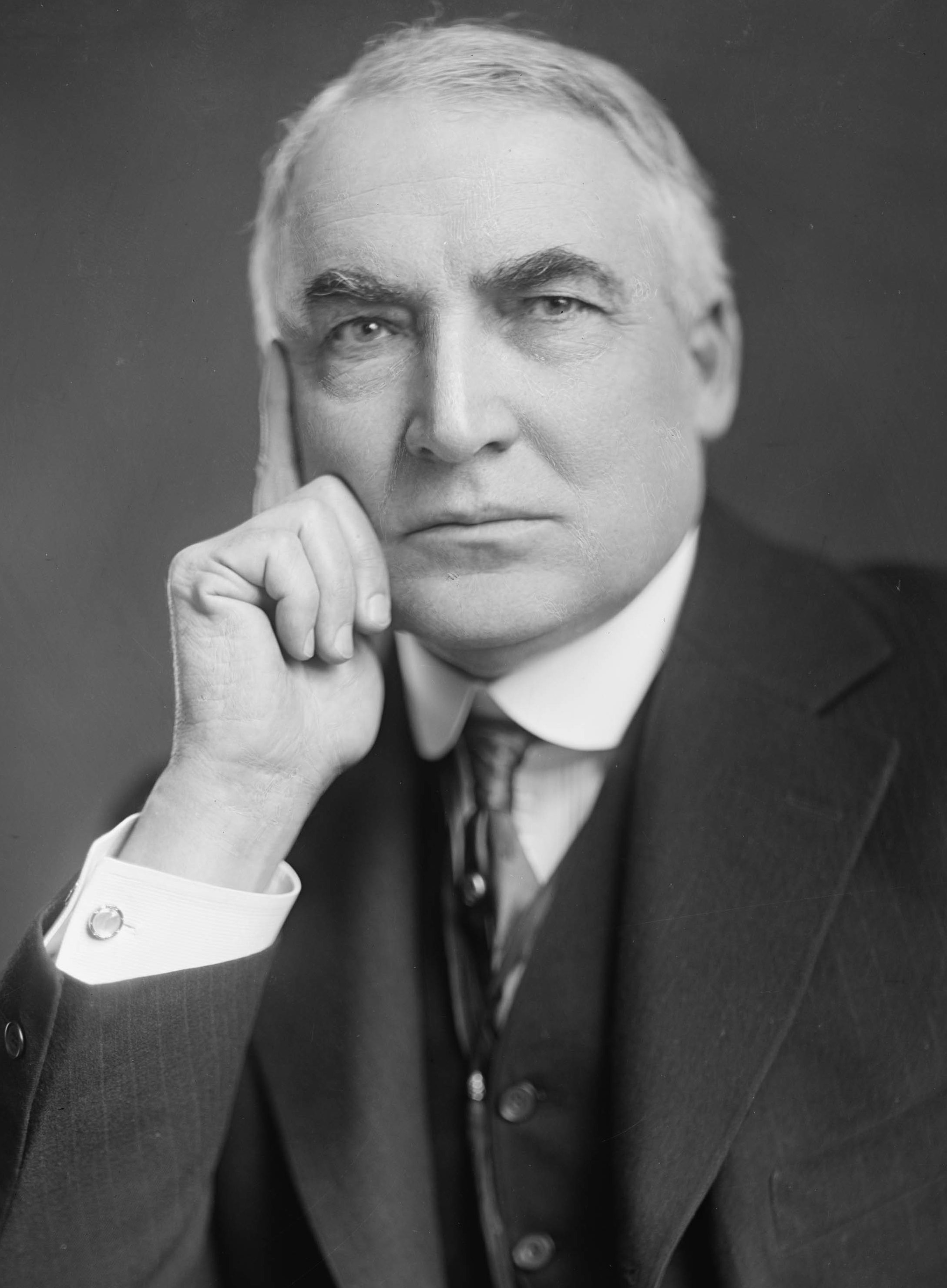

Nominee	Warren G. Harding	James M. Cox
Party	Republican	Democratic
Home state	Ohio	Ohio
Running mate	Calvin Coolidge	Franklin D. Roosevelt
Electoral vote	4	0
Popular vote	81,555	56,639
Percentage	55.93%	38.84%
County results
Harding
40–50%
50–60%
60–70%
70–80%
President before election
Woodrow Wilson
Democratic
Elected President
Warren G. Harding
Republican

The 1920 United States presidential election in Utah took place on November 2, 1920. All contemporary forty-eight states took part as part of the 1920 United States presidential election, and the state voters selected four electors to the Electoral College, who voted for president and vice president. This was the first presidential election to feature as a distinct voting unit Daggett County, the newest and least populous of Utah's current twenty-nine counties.

In 1916, Utah had turned strongly Democratic as a result of a powerful "peace vote" for incumbent President Woodrow Wilson; however, by the beginning of 1920 skyrocketing inflation and Wilson's focus upon his proposed League of Nations at the expense of domestic policy had helped make the incumbent president very unpopular – besides which Wilson also had major health problems that had left First Lady Edith effectively running the nation. Political unrest seen in the Palmer Raids and the "Red Scare" further added to the unpopularity of the Democratic Party, since this global political turmoil produced considerable fear of alien revolutionaries invading the country. Demand in the West for exclusion of Asian immigrants became even stronger than it had been before.

All these factors combined to produce a national landslide, with a swing of almost twenty-nine percentage points to the Republicans vis-à-vis the election of 1916. Utah followed the national trend closely: whereas Wilson had won the state by twenty percentage points in 1916 and had clean-swept the twenty-eight extant counties, in 1920 Harding by campaigning on a "return to normalcy" carried every county in Utah with a swing of thirty-seven percentage points. This was the first time Washington County had ever been carried by the Republican nominee. Despite this large swing, Utah in 1920 still voted 9.08 percentage points more Democratic than the nation at-large.

On the ballot in Utah in 1920 in addition to the two major party candidates were Utah native Parley P. Christensen of the "Farmer-Labor" Party, and imprisoned Socialist candidate Eugene Debs in his fifth and final run for president. Christensen was supported by some unionists and veterans of Theodore Roosevelt's 1912 presidential campaign. Despite the endorsement of Herbert Croly, Christensen received only one percent of the nationwide vote, and although he finished ahead of Cox in numerous counties in Washington State and South Dakota, Parley could only obtain three percent in his home state, whilst Debs accomplished even less.

== Results ==
General Election Results
Party	Pledged to	Elector	Votes
Republican Party	Warren G. Harding	J. Howard Garrett	81,555
Republican Party	Warren G. Harding	Warren L. Watts	81,363
Republican Party	Warren G. Harding	Margaret Lewis Judd	81,343
Republican Party	Warren G. Harding	James A. Melville Jr.	81,325
Democratic Party	James M. Cox	Daisy Allen	56,639
Democratic Party	James M. Cox	Martha E. Barnes	56,601
Democratic Party	James M. Cox	William Edwards	56,548
Democratic Party	James M. Cox	E. E. Hoffman	56,435
Farmer-Labor Party	Parley P. Christensen	W. H. Schock	4,475
Farmer-Labor Party	Parley P. Christensen	Robert J. Dixon	4,443
Farmer-Labor Party	Parley P. Christensen	Elizabeth A. Donohue	4,437
Farmer-Labor Party	Parley P. Christensen	C. T. Martain	4,437
Socialist Party	Eugene V. Debs	Ole Arilson	3,159
Socialist Party	Eugene V. Debs	Lois N. Parsons	3,145
Socialist Party	Eugene V. Debs	Stanley Torsak	3,145
Socialist Party	Eugene V. Debs	Mary Shelton	3,143
Votes cast (Note: Based on highest elector on each ticket)			145,828

=== Results by county ===
County	Warren G. Harding Republican		James M. Cox Democratic		Parley P. Christensen Farmer-Labor		Eugene V. Debs Socialist		Margin		Total votes cast
County	#	%	#	%	#	%	#	%	#	%	Total votes cast
Beaver	1,056	57.49%	741	40.34%	15	0.82%	25	1.36%	315	17.15%	1,837
Box Elder	3,421	58.86%	2,330	40.09%	26	0.45%	35	0.60%	1,091	18.77%	5,812
Cache	5,063	53.88%	4,239	45.11%	42	0.45%	53	0.56%	824	8.77%	9,397
Carbon	1,675	47.05%	1,559	43.79%	224	6.29%	102	2.87%	116	3.26%	3,560
Daggett	94	73.44%	32	25.00%	0	0.00%	2	1.56%	62	48.44%	128
Davis	2,463	59.75%	1,632	39.59%	8	0.19%	19	0.46%	831	20.16%	4,122
Duchesne	1,523	61.76%	822	33.33%	73	2.96%	48	1.95%	701	28.43%	2,466
Emery	1,285	53.59%	1,029	42.91%	16	0.67%	68	2.84%	256	10.68%	2,398
Garfield	1,023	71.49%	393	27.46%	6	0.42%	9	0.63%	630	44.03%	1,431
Grand	306	51.17%	278	46.49%	6	1.00%	8	1.34%	28	4.68%	598
Iron	1,399	69.60%	561	27.91%	2	0.10%	48	2.39%	838	41.69%	2,010
Juab	1,692	53.12%	1,308	41.07%	40	1.26%	145	4.55%	384	12.05%	3,185
Kane	501	72.61%	186	26.96%	1	0.14%	2	0.29%	315	45.65%	690
Millard	2,199	62.56%	1,167	33.20%	23	0.65%	126	3.58%	1,032	29.36%	3,515
Morgan	544	57.57%	397	42.01%	2	0.21%	2	0.21%	147	15.56%	945
Piute	538	63.82%	283	33.57%	9	1.07%	13	1.54%	255	30.25%	843
Rich	449	66.92%	222	33.08%	0	0.00%	0	0.00%	227	33.84%	671
Salt Lake	27,841	54.73%	19,249	37.84%	2,300	4.52%	1,483	2.92%	8,592	16.89%	50,873
San Juan	523	64.81%	260	32.22%	1	0.12%	23	2.85%	263	32.59%	807
Sanpete	3,741	60.15%	2,406	38.69%	11	0.18%	61	0.98%	1,335	21.46%	6,219
Sevier	2,506	62.84%	1,425	35.73%	22	0.55%	35	0.88%	1,081	27.11%	3,988
Summit	1,503	59.79%	874	34.77%	68	2.70%	69	2.74%	629	25.02%	2,514
Tooele	1,387	56.15%	916	37.09%	108	4.37%	59	2.39%	471	19.06%	2,470
Uintah	1,354	60.47%	817	36.49%	6	0.27%	62	2.77%	537	23.98%	2,239
Utah	7,752	53.34%	6,377	43.88%	131	0.90%	272	1.87%	1,375	9.46%	14,532
Wasatch	1,061	61.05%	665	38.26%	2	0.12%	10	0.58%	396	22.79%	1,738
Washington	1,138	52.78%	1,008	46.75%	3	0.14%	7	0.32%	130	6.03%	2,156
Wayne	396	61.97%	224	35.05%	5	0.78%	14	2.19%	172	26.92%	639
Weber	7,122	50.71%	5,239	37.30%	1,325	9.43%	359	2.56%	1,883	13.41%	14,045
Totals	81,555	55.93%	56,639	38.84%	4,475	3.07%	3,159	2.17%	24,916	17.09%	145,828

==== Counties that flipped from Democratic to Republican ====
- Beaver
- Box Elder
- Cache
- Carbon
- Davis
- Duchesne
- Emery
- Garfield
- Grand
- Iron
- Juab
- Kane
- Millard
- Morgan
- Piute
- Rich
- Salt Lake
- San Juan
- Sanpete
- Sevier
- Summit
- Tooele
- Uintah
- Utah
- Wasatch
- Washington
- Wayne
- Weber

== See also ==
- United States presidential elections in Utah
