= Faust, Utah =

Unincorporated community in the state of Utah, United States

Coordinates: 40°11′03″N 112°23′31″W

Faust is a settlement located in central Tooele County, Utah, United States.

== Description ==
The community was founded by Henry J. Faust (born Heinrich Jacob Faust), a Mormon immigrant from Germany. In 1860 he managed Faust Station on the Pony Express trail. He later bought the property for his ranch. In 1870 Henry Faust and his wife moved to Salt Lake City. Faust has been used by the Union Pacific Railroad to house workers on the site. The area is popular with campers, mountain bikers, off-road vehicle enthusiasts, and hikers during the summer months. Henry J. Faust was an ancestor of James E. Faust.
