= Tooele County, Utah =

County in Utah, United States

Tooele County
- County
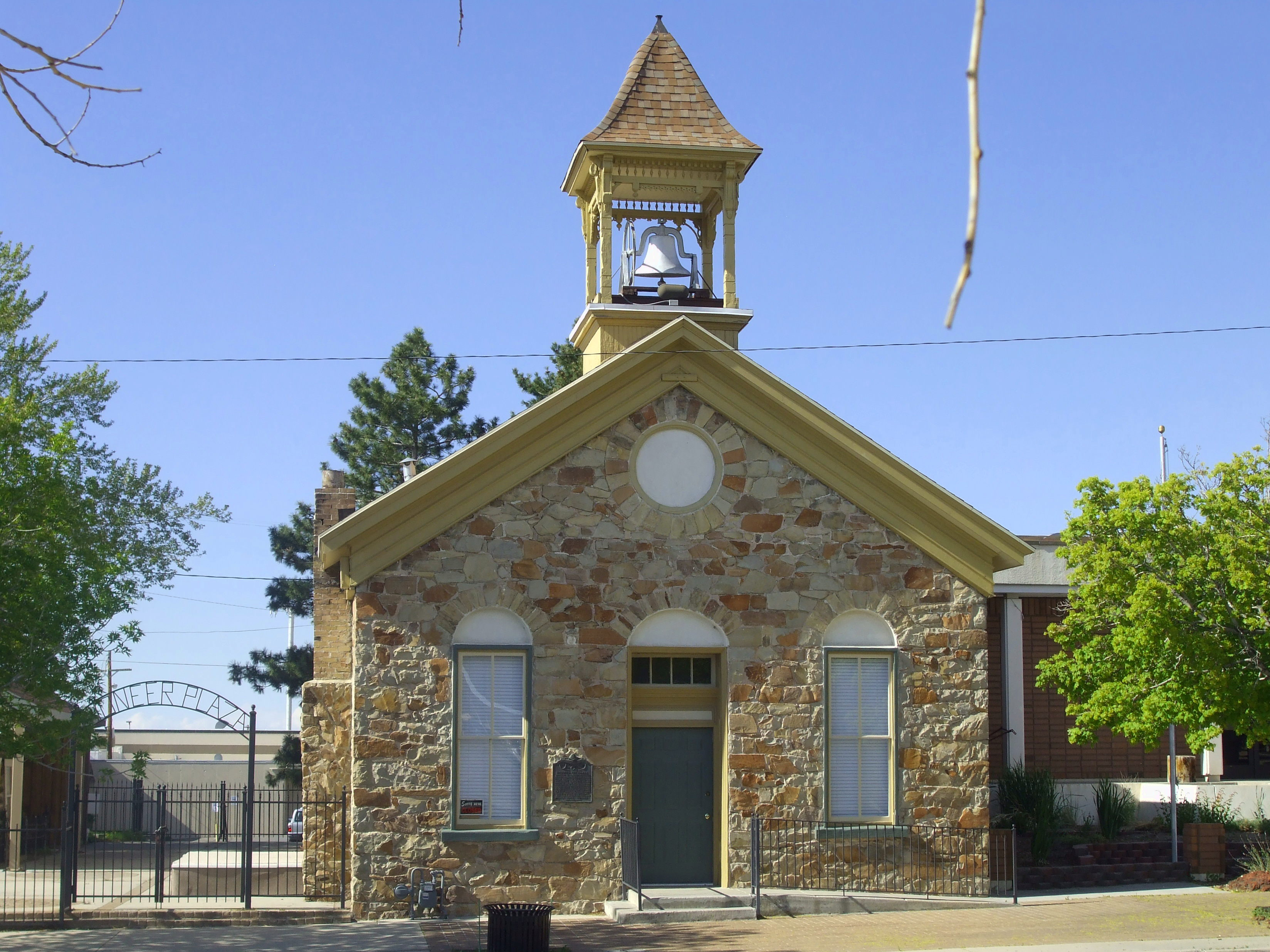
- Tooele County Courthouse and City Hall in Tooele, Utah.
- USGS 2001 County Boundary Interactive map of Tooele County
- Location in Utah
- Coordinates: 40.45°N 113.18°W
- Country: United States
- State: Utah
- Founded: January 31, 1850
- Organized: June 10, 1851
- Seat: Tooele
- Largest city: Tooele

Government
  - Type: County Commission
  - Body: Tooele County; Commissioner

Area
  - Total: 7,286 sq mi (18,870 km^{2})
  - Land: 6,941 sq mi (17,980 km^{2})
  - Water: 345 sq mi (890 km^{2})
- Elevation: 4,278 ft (1,304 m)

Population (2020)
  - Total: 72,698
  - Estimate (2026): 90,094 ▲
  - Density: 10.47/sq mi (4.044/km^{2})

GDP
  - Total: $2,884,830 (2023)
- Time zone: UTC-7 (Mountain Time Zone)
  - Summer (DST): UTC-6 (Mountain Daylight Time)
- Postal code: 84074
- Area codes: Area code 435
- FIPS code: 49-045
- GNIS feature ID: 1448036
- Congressional districts: Utah's 2nd congressional district
- Website: www.tooeleco.gov

Tooele County (/tuːˈwɪlə/ too-WIL-ə) is a county in the U.S. state of Utah. As of the 2020 United States census, the population was 72,698. Its county seat and largest city is Tooele. The county was created in 1850 and organized the following year. Tooele County is part of the Salt Lake City, UT Metropolitan Statistical Area.

The western half is mostly covered by the Great Salt Lake Desert and includes the city of Wendover (the immediate neighbor of West Wendover, Nevada) and Ibapah. Within the central section lies Skull Valley, between the Cedar and the Stansbury Mountains. It contains a few small towns as well as the Dugway Proving Ground. The population centers are on the eastern edge in the Tooele Valley, between the Stansbury and Oquirrh Mountains. This area contains the cities of Tooele, Grantsville, Erda, and Lake Point as well as the unincorporated community of Stansbury Park. Tooele Army Depot is located on the southern edge of the valley. The Stockton Bar geologic feature separates Tooele Valley and Rush Valley, in which the towns of Stockton, Vernon, Faust, and Rush Valley are located. Additional small towns, Ophir and Mercur, are located in two canyons on the south western side of the Oquirrh Mountains.

Tooele is home to two statewide regional campuses of Utah State University (located in the cities of Tooele and Wendover).

== History ==
Evidence of several indigenous Native American groups has been found in Tooele County, but only the western Shoshone-speaking Goshute tribe claim the desolate lands as their ancestral home. The Goshute's traditional territory includes most of modern Tooele County.

The Great Salt Lake Desert, which comprises much of the northern portion of the county, provided a major stumbling block for the ill-fated Donner-Reed Party in 1846. Its crusty sand slowed the group's wagons to such an extent that the group spent six days crossing its 80-mile length, severely sapping the group's resources and leading to their eventual disaster.

In 1847, Mormon pioneers settled in the neighboring Salt Lake Valley. Initially, Tooele Valley was used as a major grazing ground for Mormon cattle owners from Salt Lake and Utah Valleys. In 1849 the first white settlers established permanent roots in the Tooele Valley. Building a saw mill, the settlement was called E.T. City after LDS leader E.T. Benson. The territorial legislature first designated Tooele County—initially called "Tuilla"—on January 31, 1850, with significantly different boundaries. Its government was not organized at that time, and the area was attached to Salt Lake County for judicial and administrative purposes. It is speculated the name derives from a Native American chief, but controversy exists about whether such a chief lived. Alternate explanations hypothesize that the name comes from "tu-wanda", the Goshute word for "bear", or from "tule", a Spanish word of Aztec origins meaning "bulrush".

The Goshutes did not accept Mormon encroachment on their traditional homeland. The Mormons occupied the best camping sites near reliable springs, hunted in Goshute hunting grounds, and overgrazed the meadowland, leaving it unfit for sustaining the animals and plants used by the Goshutes. Mormons believed that Utah was a promised land given to them by God, and did not recognize any Goshute claim to the land. Goshutes began confiscating Mormon cattle that trespassed onto their property. In response, the Mormons ordered their armies to kill the Goshutes. In 1850, they ambushed a Goshute village, but the Goshutes were able to defend themselves without casualties. Later that year, a contingent of at least 50 men attacked the Goshute camp, killing nine and suffering no casualties. In 1851, General Daniel H. Wells took 30 people prisoners. After they tried to escape, Wells executed them. Similar attacks occurred throughout the 1850s with Goshutes typically being on the losing side.

By June 10, 1851, the county government was organized. On that date the county attachment to Salt Lake County was terminated. By 1852, Grantsville, Batesville, and Pine Canyon (later named Lincoln) were settled.

In 1855 the town of Richville was designated county seat, but it soon became clear that Tooele was much larger. In 1861 the territorial legislature allowed the county to select a new seat, and Tooele was selected.

In 1859 Robert B. Jarvis, a U.S. Bureau of Indian Affairs representative, convinced some of the nomadic bands to congregate at a farm reservation called Deep Creek. The results looked promising, but Jarvis' resignation in 1860 led support to disappear and the farm to be abandoned. Jarvis' replacement, Benjamin Davies, noted the Goshutes had lost faith in the federal government, and recommended limiting further encroachments on Goshute land, but his suggestions were largely ignored.

Twenty-two overland stagecoach outposts were built in Goshute territory, often on the sites of rare natural springs. Goshute attacks on mail outposts escalated in 1860, resulting in dozens of deaths in alternating waves of raids. At the outbreak of the American Civil War, federal troops left the area leaving defense in the hands of the Nauvoo Legion until General Patrick E. Connor arrived in Salt Lake City from California in 1862.

Connor acted ruthlessly toward the natives. He killed over 300 Shoshone in southern Idaho in 1863. Connor's men attacked Native American camps, sometimes indiscriminately, but through 1863 stage coach companies had lost 16 men and over 150 horses to depredations. A peace treaty was signed in 1863 which included an annuity of goods and US$1000 in compensation of killed game in exchange for an end to the hostilities, and use of routes through the natives' territories. The treaty did not cede Goshute control of land, but a follow-up agreement made in June 1865 did.

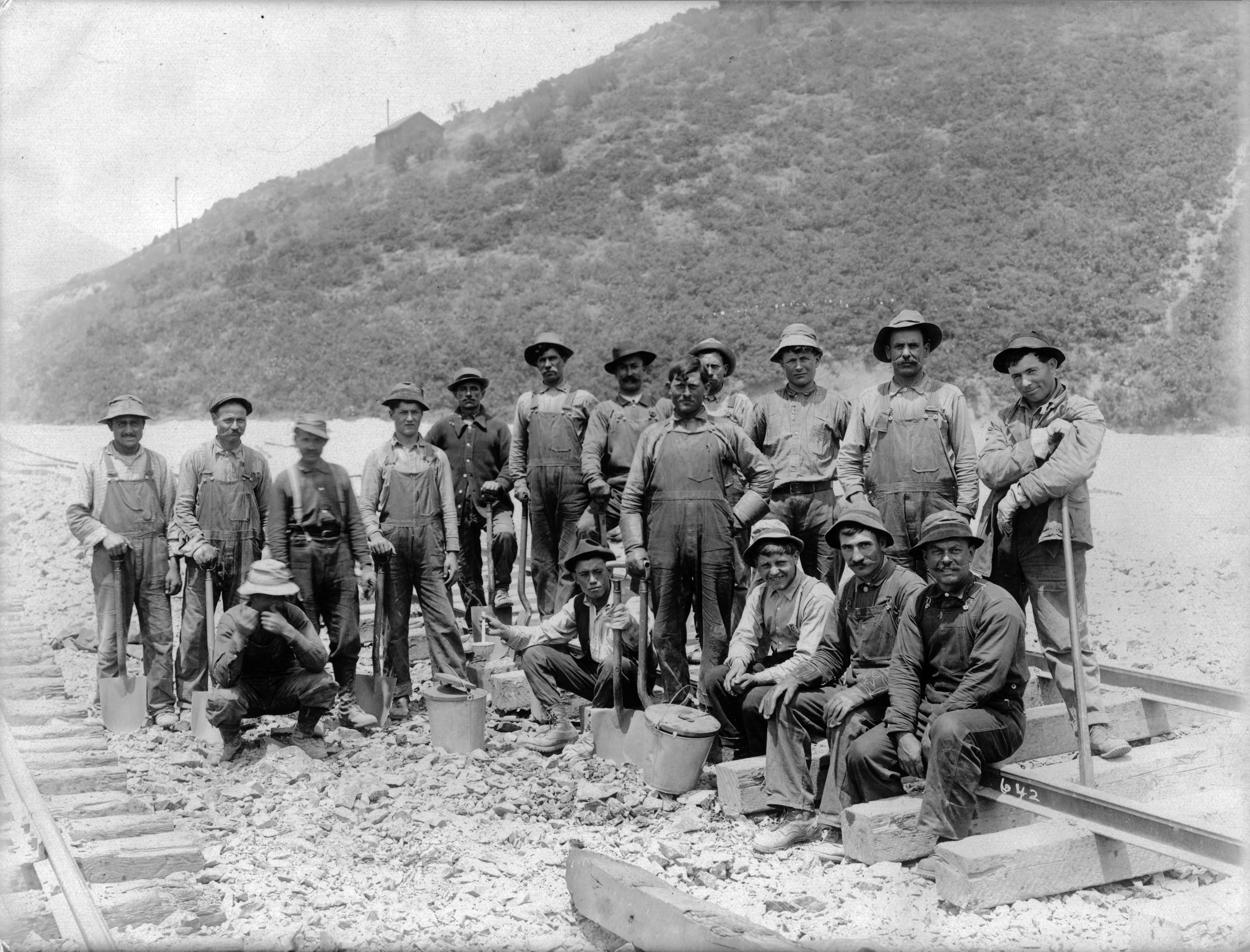
Minerals discovered in Tooele County led to a population boom.

General Connor, who was anti-Mormon, also encouraged his troops to prospect for minerals. Connor believed that mining would bring non-Mormons to Utah Territory. After his men discovered gold, silver, lead, and zinc deposits in Tooele County in 1864 he was proven right. The Rush Valley Mining District was established by soldiers in the western Oquirrh Mountains and more than 100 claims were staked in the first year. Two new mining towns, Ophir and Lewiston ballooned to over 6,000 people each in the 1870s, exceeding the population of Tooele and all the Mormon settlements in the area.

Tooele County as originally defined extended into present-day Nevada. The county's borders were adjusted in 1852, in 1854, in 1856, in 1861, and in 1862. When Nevada Territory was created in 1862, the county's borders were impacted, and when the Territory became a state (1864), Tooele County was formally divested of all its Nevada area. Two more boundary adjustments were made in 1870 and 1880, after which it has retained its boundaries to the present.

=== Republic of Tooele ===
From 1874 to 1879, non-Mormon politicians from the Liberal Party of Utah gained control of Tooele County, the first time any non-Mormons had success in Utah politics. Whimsically, they called the county the Republic of Tooele.

The 1874 election marked the first success of the anti-Mormon Liberal Party, which was organized in 1870. The party viewed the large non-Mormon mining population in the county as a natural environment for electoral success and campaigned fiercely in Tooele's mining districts leading up to the June 1874 election. The non-Mormon appointed governor of Utah Territory, George L. Woods, campaigned for the Liberals in Tooele County.

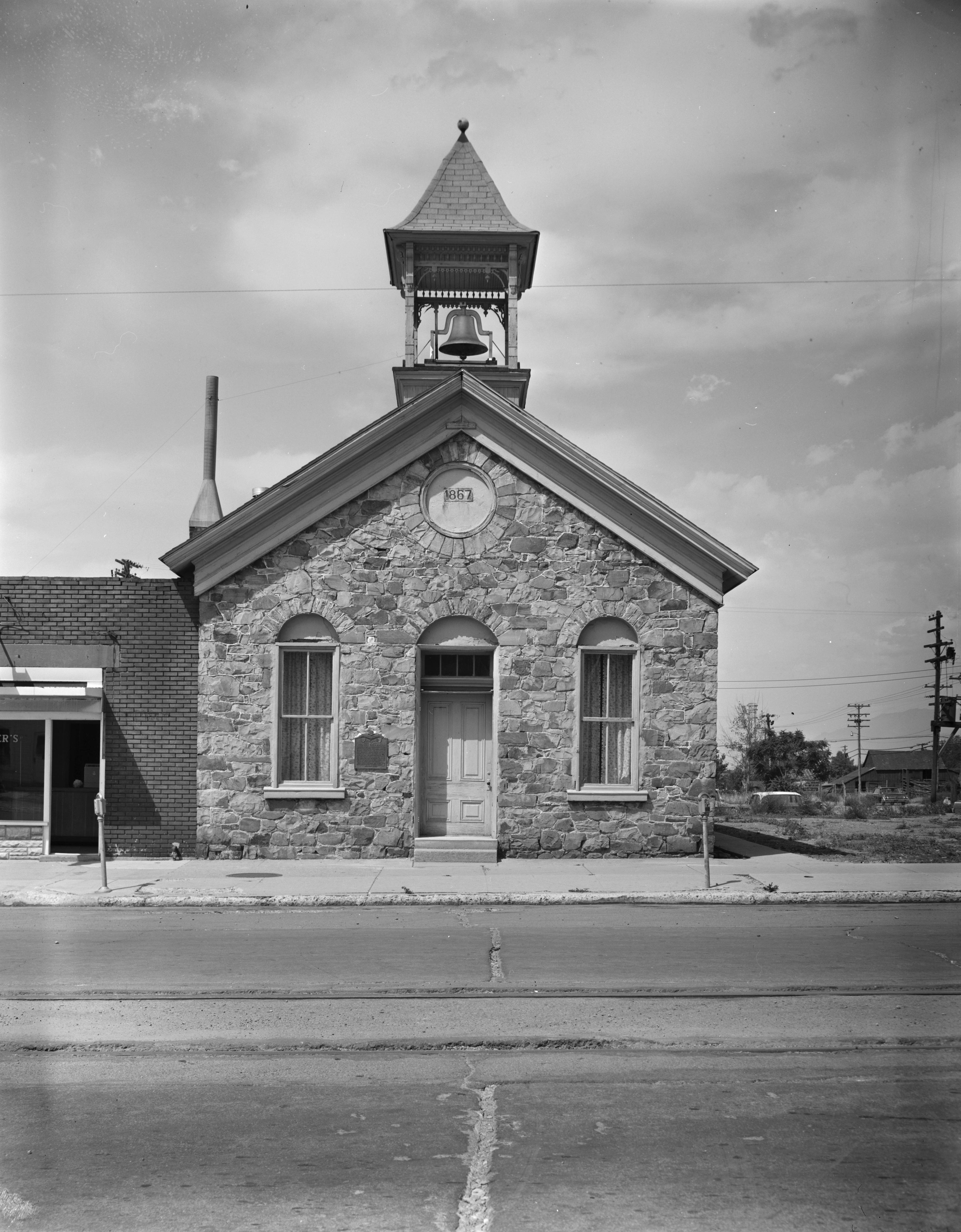
The old Tooele County Courthouse was site of a political power struggle in 1874.

The incumbent Mormon People's Party observed several Tooele polling places on election day and lodged complaints of fraud after the Liberal Party triumphed by about 300 votes out of 2,200. The People's Party alleged Liberal Party supporters had voted more than once, that many had not been residents for the required six months, and they were not taxpayers—according to territorial law, only taxpayers could vote in elections. The People's Party called attention to the 2,200 votes cast in the election although only 1,500 Tooele County property taxpayers were on record. Incumbents refused to yield control of the Tooele County recorder's office and the Tooele County Courthouse because of the alleged fraud.

Governor Woods dismissed the complaints and certified the Liberal victory. Third District Court Judge James B. McKean ruled that no evidence showing illegal activity had been presented. McKean construed poll tax as within the meaning of being a taxpayer. Since no evidence was provided there were over 300 carpetbaggers or repeat votes in the election, McKean sustained the tally and authorized deputy U.S. Marshals to install the Liberal candidates.

The recorder's office was seized when it was momentarily abandoned, but a contingent of People's Party supporters and incumbents held the county courthouse night and day. The marshals and Liberal Party candidates, outnumbered, attempted to negotiate with the armed and barricaded Mormons. Aware that a show of aggression could spark a battle, the parties were nonetheless unable to come to an agreement to hand over power.

McKean issued an even more strongly worded injunction, and Brigham Young advised his followers that they had an obligation to obey the federal courts. The county courthouse was abandoned, thus beginning about five years of Liberal Party rule. However, the Utah territorial legislature, which had the last say on the qualifications of its members, refused to seat the Liberal Party representative from Tooele County.

The Liberals won an unopposed 1876 election.

In 1876, the territorial legislature passed bills requiring voter registration and requiring women's suffrage for local elections—women had been voting in territorial elections since 1870. The Liberal Party, typically supported by male miners casually interested in politics, opposed both measures. In 1878 the Liberal majority in Tooele County disappeared, and the People's Party regained control in 1879 after more than six months of Liberal procedural delays.

The Republic of Tooele era was characterized by subsequent politicians as one of excessive spending. The county was left with about $16,000 in debt, significantly more than it started with.

=== Modern Tooele ===
Mining continued to play an important part in Tooele County into the 20th century, but the county benefited from two major military bases located in the western portion of the county. Wendover Air Force Base, now closed, was the training base of the Enola Gay crew, which dropped the first atomic weapon in 1945. The Tooele Army Depot, built in 1942, formerly housed the largest store of chemical and biological weapons, 45 percent of the nation's, in the United States, at the Deseret Chemical Depot. Starting August 1996, the store was reduced by destruction in a controversial weapons incinerator, at the Tooele Chemical Agent Disposal Facility; the last such weapon was destroyed in January 2012.

Since the 1980s, much of Tooele County's economic prospects have centered around private hazardous waste disposal facilities. Between 1988 and 1993, hazardous waste landfills and incinerators have been installed at Clive and Aragonite. This, coupled with uranium mine tailings from Salt Lake County which were disposed in Tooele County in the 1980s, the presence of the Deseret Chemical Depot, and a high-polluting magnesium facility in Rowley, have contributed to a general perception of Tooele County as a "sacrifice zone" for unwanted wastes.

News coverage for the county is provided by the Tooele Transcript-Bulletin newspaper.

On September 8, 2004, the Genesis spacecraft crashed into the desert floor of the Dugway Proving Ground in Tooele County.

A 2008 CNNMoney.com article identified Tooele as the U.S. county experiencing the greatest job growth since 2000.

The county's western portion is home to the Bonneville Salt Flats, traversed by Interstate 80 and the Wendover Cut-off, the former routing of the Victory Highway.

== Geography ==
Tooele County lies on the west side of Utah. Its west border abuts the east border of the state of Nevada. Its northeast border abuts the Great Salt Lake. Three significant mountain ranges run north–south through the county. Its east boundary line is delineated by the crestline of the Oquirrh Mountains, which separate the Tooele Valley from the Salt Lake Valley. The Stansbury Mountains parallel the Oquirrhs in the eastern part of the county, and the Cedar Mountains also run parallel to the other two through the east-central part of the county. There are also isolated prominences across the county, especially at its SW corner. The county terrain is largely arid and unused for agriculture unless irrigation water is available. The county generally slopes to the north. Its highest elevation is Deseret Peak in the Stansburys, at 11,031 ft (3,362 m) ASL. The county has a total area of 7,286 square miles (18,870 km^{2}), of which 6,941 square miles (17,980 km^{2}) is land and 345 square miles (890 km^{2}) (4.7%) is water.

Covering vast amounts of the Great Salt Lake desert west of Salt Lake Valley, Tooele County is the second largest county in Utah and among the driest. The Skull Valley Indian Reservation lies in Skull Valley, between the Cedar and Stansbury mountain ranges.

=== Major highways ===
- Interstate 80
- Utah State Route 36
- Utah State Route 73
- Utah State Route 112
- Utah State Route 138
- Utah State Route 179
- Utah State Route 196
- Utah State Route 199

=== Adjacent counties ===
- Box Elder County - north
- Weber County - northeast (across Great Salt Lake)
- Davis County - east (across Great Salt Lake)
- Salt Lake County - east
- Utah County - east
- Juab County - south
- White Pine County, Nevada -southwest
- Elko County, Nevada - west

=== Protected areas ===
- Salt Springs Waterfowl Management Area
- Timpie Springs Waterfowl Management Area
- Uinta-Wasatch-Cache National Forest (part)
  - Wasatch National Forest (part)
- Deseret Peak Wilderness Area

=== Lakes ===
- Atherley Reservoir
- Big Spring (near Callao)
- Big Spring (Skull Valley)
- Big Spring (near Timpie Springs)
- Black Spring
- Blue Lake (Salt Springs Waterfowl Management Area)
- Blue Lakes (in and near Grantsville)
- Chadman Spring
- Cold Spring
- Deep Creek Reservoir
- Dry Lake (Dugway Proving Ground)
- Dry Lake (East Tintic Mountains)
- Grantsville Reservoir
- Greasewood Pond
- Great Salt Lake (partially)
- Horseshoe Springs
- Jacobs Hole
- JB Reservoir
- Jenning Springs
- Kanaka Lake
- Last Chance Lakes
- Mill Pond
- Muskrat Spring
- North Table Mountain Reservoir
- North Willow Lake
- Oswald Reservoir
- Redden Springs
- Rock Bottom Pond
- Rocky Spring
- Rush Lake
- Salt Springs
- Scribner Spring
- Settlement Canyon Reservoir
- Simpson Springs
- South Willow Lake
- Staley Reservoir
- Stansbury Lake
- SunTen Lake I
- SunTen Lake II
- Swimming Hole
- Timpie Springs
- Valley Reservoir
- Vernon Reservoir
- Warm Spring (near Rush Valley)
- Warm Springs (near Grantsville)
- Willow Patch Springs
- Wilson Health Springs

== Demographics ==
Historical population
Census	Pop.	Note	%±
1860	1,008		—
1870	2,177		116.0%
1880	4,497		106.6%
1890	3,700		−17.7%
1900	7,361		98.9%
1910	7,924		7.6%
1920	7,965		0.5%
1930	9,413		18.2%
1940	9,133		−3.0%
1950	14,636		60.3%
1960	17,868		22.1%
1970	21,545		20.6%
1980	26,033		20.8%
1990	26,601		2.2%
2000	40,735		53.1%
2010	58,218		42.9%
2020	72,698		24.9%
2025 (est.)	87,461	▲	20.3%
US Decennial Census; 1790–1960 1900–1990; 1990–2000 2010–2020

=== 2020 census ===
According to the 2020 United States census and 2020 American Community Survey, there were 72,698 people in Tooele County with a population density of 10.3 people per square mile (4.0/km^{2}). Among non-Hispanic or Latino people, the racial makeup was 58,199 (80.1%) White, 436 (0.6%) African American, 445 (0.6%) Native American, 511 (0.7%) Asian, 637 (0.9%) Pacific Islander, 282 (0.4%) from other races, and 2,666 (3.7%) from two or more races. 9,522 (13.1%) people were Hispanic or Latino.

Tooele County, Utah – Racial and ethnic composition Note: the US Census treats Hispanic/Latino as an ethnic category. This table excludes Latinos from the racial categories and assigns them to a separate category. Hispanics/Latinos may be of any race.
Race / Ethnicity (NH = Non-Hispanic)	Pop 2000	Pop 2010	Pop 2020	% 2000	% 2010	% 2020
White alone (NH)	34,497	49,174	58,199	84.69%	84.47%	80.06%
Black or African American alone (NH)	480	372	436	1.18%	0.64%	0.60%
Native American or Alaska Native alone (NH)	600	464	445	1.47%	0.80%	0.61%
Asian alone (NH)	234	357	511	0.57%	0.61%	0.70%
Pacific Islander alone (NH)	64	212	637	0.16%	0.36%	0.88%
Other race alone (NH)	21	39	282	0.05%	0.07%	0.39%
Mixed race or Multiracial (NH)	625	939	2,666	1.53%	1.61%	3.67%
Hispanic or Latino (any race)	4,214	6,661	9,522	10.34%	11.44%	13.10%
Total	40,735	58,218	72,698	100.00%	100.00%	100.00%

There were 36,687 (50.46%) males and 36,011 (49.54%) females, and the population distribution by age was 23,959 (33.0%) under the age of 18, 41,869 (57.6%) from 18 to 64, and 6,870 (9.5%) who were at least 65 years old. The median age was 31.4 years.

There were 22,087 households in Tooele County with an average size of 3.29 of which 17,531 (79.4%) were families and 4,556 (20.6%) were non-families. Among all families, 13,990 (63.3%) were married couples, 1,398 (6.3%) were male householders with no spouse, and 2,143 (9.7%) were female householders with no spouse. Among all non-families, 3,572 (16.2%) were a single person living alone and 984 (4.5%) were two or more people living together. 10,566 (47.8%) of all households had children under the age of 18. 17,970 (81.4%) of households were owner-occupied while 4,117 (18.6%) were renter-occupied.

The median income for a Tooele County household was $76,737 and the median family income was $83,730, with a per-capita income of $27,702. The median income for males that were full-time employees was $57,579 and for females $40,845. 5.9% of the population and 4.7% of families were below the poverty line.

In terms of education attainment, out of the 40,623 people in Tooele County 25 years or older, 3,224 (7.9%) had not completed high school, 12,971 (31.9%) had a high school diploma or equivalency, 15,055 (37.1%) had some college or associate degree, 6,091 (15.0%) had a bachelor's degree, and 3,282 (8.1%) had a graduate or professional degree.

== Environmental concerns ==
Heavy industry and the resulting pollution of the air, soil, and groundwater has affected the region in several ways. The US Environmental Protection Agency has reported that Tooele-based US Magnesium discharges dangerous toxins and cancerous byproducts. In 2008, the federal government considered listing the area as a Superfund site. Tooele County was listed in 1989 as having the worst air in Utah, according to federal agencies and environmental groups. The Tooele County Health Department notes that the chemical output of the heavy industry can be particularly dangerous in the winter, because the region's climate and setting create winter inversions, suspending the toxins in the air, and posing "serious health concerns".

Due to the history of toxic waste disposal in the area, Tooele County and Utah residents have opposed plans to dispose of nuclear waste in the county boundaries. A high level nuclear waste site proposed to be built at the Goshute Tribe Reservation in Skull Valley faced opposition until the plan slowly fizzled out. Projects to dispose of depleted uranium at Energy Solution's Clive facility continue to cause controversy.

== Politics and government ==
From 1932 through 1968, Tooele County tended Democratic, selecting the Democratic nominee in every election save 1956 (but being blue enough to vote for Stevenson in 1952). From 1972 on, however, it has become powerfully Republican, voting Democratic only once in this period thus far, for Bill Clinton in 1996 (with a low plurality and by a narrow margin).

State elected offices
Position	District	Name	Affiliation	First elected
Senate	11	Emily Buss	Forward	2025 (special)
Senate	17	Scott Sandall	Republican	2018
House of Representatives	21	Douglas Sagers	Republican	2010
House of Representatives	68	Merrill Nelson	Republican	2012
Board of Education	3	Matt Hymas	Republican	2020

United States presidential election results for Tooele County, Utah
Year	Republican		Democratic		Third party(ies)	
Year	No.	%	No.	%	No.	%
1896	274	13.99%	1,684	86.01%	0	0.00%
1900	1,259	52.70%	1,114	46.63%	16	0.67%
1904	1,289	63.44%	639	31.45%	104	5.12%
1908	1,106	56.03%	808	40.93%	60	3.04%
1912	950	44.21%	646	30.06%	553	25.73%
1916	1,124	40.61%	1,528	55.20%	116	4.19%
1920	1,387	56.15%	916	37.09%	167	6.76%
1924	1,295	52.47%	674	27.31%	499	20.22%
1928	1,707	54.22%	1,421	45.14%	20	0.64%
1932	1,407	42.34%	1,865	56.12%	51	1.53%
1936	1,029	30.27%	2,361	69.46%	9	0.26%
1940	1,476	35.93%	2,625	63.90%	7	0.17%
1944	1,753	38.45%	2,802	61.46%	4	0.09%
1948	2,036	41.69%	2,798	57.29%	50	1.02%
1952	3,209	47.68%	3,521	52.32%	0	0.00%
1956	3,390	55.82%	2,683	44.18%	0	0.00%
1960	3,016	45.10%	3,665	54.80%	7	0.10%
1964	2,511	32.40%	5,239	67.60%	0	0.00%
1968	3,422	41.39%	4,250	51.41%	595	7.20%
1972	5,641	66.02%	2,621	30.67%	283	3.31%
1976	4,657	50.34%	4,371	47.25%	223	2.41%
1980	6,024	62.03%	3,132	32.25%	556	5.72%
1984	6,478	63.95%	3,584	35.38%	68	0.67%
1988	5,539	56.50%	4,166	42.49%	99	1.01%
1992	3,676	35.79%	3,270	31.84%	3,325	32.37%
1996	3,881	41.68%	3,992	42.87%	1,439	15.45%
2000	7,807	62.56%	4,001	32.06%	672	5.38%
2004	12,181	73.10%	4,130	24.78%	353	2.12%
2008	10,998	62.98%	5,830	33.38%	635	3.64%
2012	14,268	73.77%	4,524	23.39%	550	2.84%
2016	11,169	50.79%	4,573	20.79%	6,250	28.42%
2020	21,014	66.67%	8,943	28.37%	1,561	4.95%
2024	23,484	69.06%	9,560	28.11%	962	2.83%

== Education ==
All parts of Tooele County are in the Tooele County School District.

Tooele County has one technical college, Tooele Technical College, and is home to two regional campuses of Utah State University, one in the city of Tooele and the other in Wendover.

== Communities ==
Map of Tooele County municipalities and CDPs

=== Cities ===
- Erda
- Grantsville
- Lake Point
- Tooele (county seat)
- Wendover

=== Towns ===
- Rush Valley
- Stockton
- Vernon

=== Census-designated places ===
- Dugway
- Ophir
- Stansbury Park

=== Townships ===
- Pine Canyon (aka Lincoln)

=== Unincorporated communities ===
- Delle
- Faust
- Gold Hill
- Ibapah
- Lofgreen
- South Rim
- Terra

=== Ghost towns ===
- Ajax
- Aragonite
- Arinosa
- Barro
- Bauer
- Benmore
- Burmester
- Center
- Clifton
- Clive
- Flux
- Iosepa
- Jacob City
- Knolls
- Low
- Mercur
- Pehrson
- Rowley
- Salduro
- Scranton
- Slagtown
- Sunshine
- Topliff
- West Dip

== See also ==
- National Register of Historic Places listings in Tooele County, Utah
