= Vernon, Utah =

Town in the state of Utah, United States

- Town
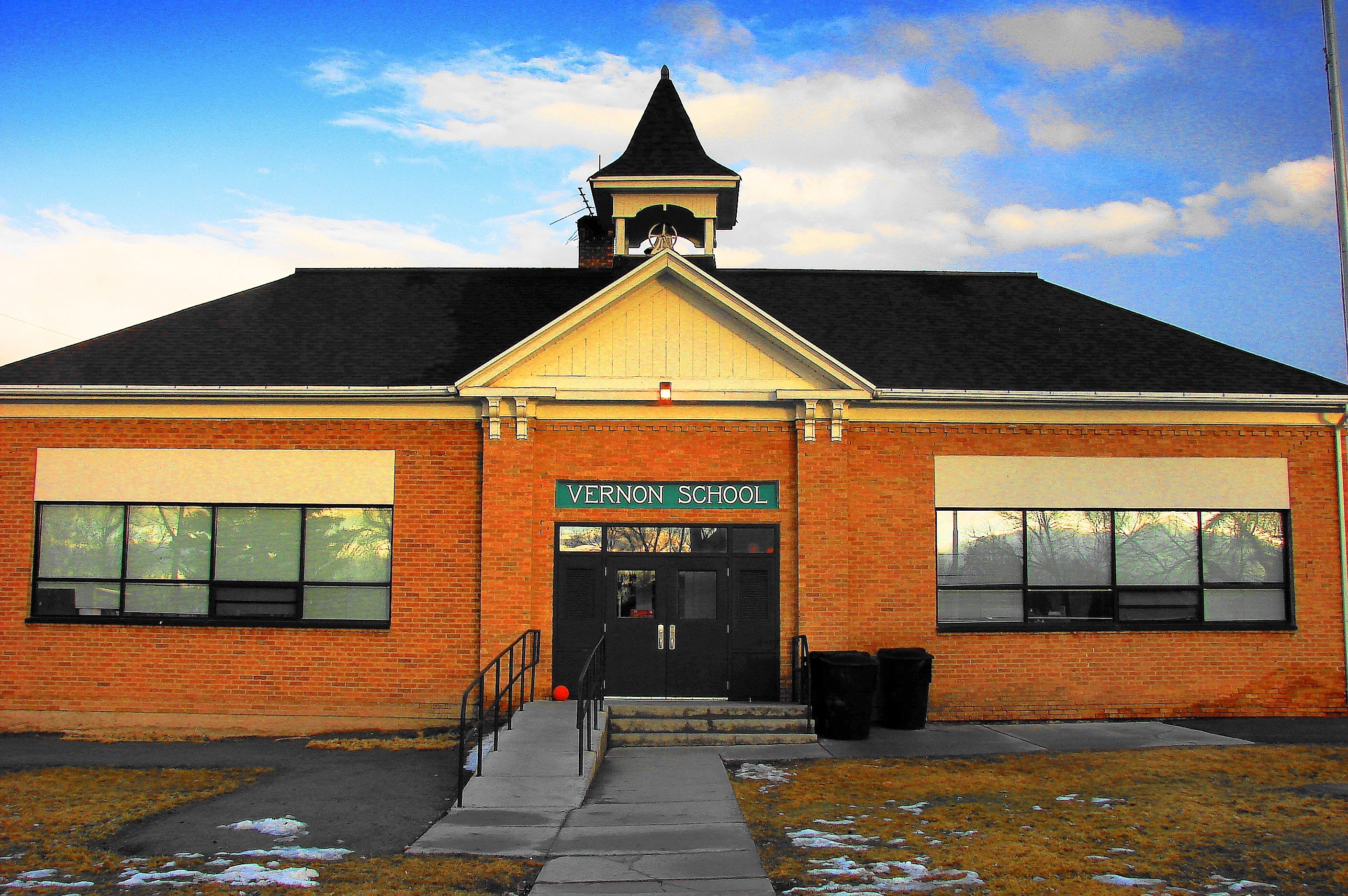
- Vernon Elementary School, January 2009
- Etymology: Joseph Vernon
- Interactive map of Vernon
- Location within Utah Location within the United States
- Coordinates: 40°06′40″N 112°26′12″W
- Country: United States
- State: Utah
- County: Tooele County
- Settled: 1857
- Incorporated (Onaqui): 1934
- Incorporated (Vernon): February 22, 1972
- Named for: Joseph Vernon

Area
  - Total: 8.06 sq mi (20.88 km^{2})
  - Land: 8.06 sq mi (20.88 km^{2})
  - Water: 0 sq mi (0.00 km^{2})
- Elevation: 5,512 ft (1,680 m)

Population (2020)
  - Total: 256
  - Density: 31.8/sq mi (12.3/km^{2})
- Time zone: UTC-7 (Mountain (MST))
  - Summer (DST): UTC-6 (MDT)
- ZIP code: 84080
- Area code: 435
- FIPS code: 49-80200
- GNIS feature ID: 2413430
- Website: vernon.utah.gov

Vernon is a town in southeastern Tooele County, Utah, United States. As of the 2020 census, Vernon had a population of 256.

== Description ==
The town located along Utah State Route 36 in southern Rush Valley and is part of the Salt Lake City Metropolitan Statistical Area. The population was 236 at the 2000 census.

Vernon is the birthplace of World War II Medal of Honor recipient Mervyn Sharp Bennion.

== Geography ==
According to the United States Census Bureau, the town has a total area of 7.5 square miles (19 km^{2}), all land.

=== Climate ===
The climate in this area is characterized by hot, humid summers and generally mild to cool winters. According to the Köppen Climate Classification system, Vernon has a hot-summer mediterranean continental climate, abbreviated "Dsa" on climate maps. The hottest temperature recorded in Vernon was 106 °F (41.1 °C) on July 13, 2002, and June 24, 2007, while the coldest temperature recorded was −26 °F (−32.2 °C) on December 23, 1990.

Climate data for Vernon, Utah, 1991–2020 normals, extremes 1953–present
Month	Jan	Feb	Mar	Apr	May	Jun	Jul	Aug	Sep	Oct	Nov	Dec	Year
Record high °F (°C)	63 (17)	67 (19)	81 (27)	86 (30)	96 (36)	106 (41)	106 (41)	102 (39)	99 (37)	90 (32)	77 (25)	76 (24)	106 (41)
Mean maximum °F (°C)	53.7 (12.1)	57.7 (14.3)	69.2 (20.7)	76.7 (24.8)	85.4 (29.7)	94.5 (34.7)	99.1 (37.3)	97.1 (36.2)	91.4 (33.0)	81.3 (27.4)	67.3 (19.6)	56.1 (13.4)	99.8 (37.7)
Mean daily maximum °F (°C)	39.4 (4.1)	43.9 (6.6)	52.1 (11.2)	58.4 (14.7)	69.4 (20.8)	81.0 (27.2)	90.1 (32.3)	88.2 (31.2)	78.6 (25.9)	64.4 (18.0)	50.4 (10.2)	39.2 (4.0)	62.9 (17.2)
Daily mean °F (°C)	25.7 (−3.5)	30.1 (−1.1)	37.9 (3.3)	43.5 (6.4)	52.9 (11.6)	63.0 (17.2)	71.5 (21.9)	69.7 (20.9)	60.3 (15.7)	47.4 (8.6)	35.2 (1.8)	25.7 (−3.5)	46.9 (8.3)
Mean daily minimum °F (°C)	12.0 (−11.1)	16.3 (−8.7)	23.7 (−4.6)	28.7 (−1.8)	36.3 (2.4)	44.9 (7.2)	52.8 (11.6)	51.2 (10.7)	42.0 (5.6)	30.3 (−0.9)	20.0 (−6.7)	12.2 (−11.0)	30.9 (−0.6)
Mean minimum °F (°C)	−4.5 (−20.3)	−1.0 (−18.3)	9.7 (−12.4)	17.0 (−8.3)	24.9 (−3.9)	32.9 (0.5)	43.0 (6.1)	41.6 (5.3)	29.7 (−1.3)	17.8 (−7.9)	2.9 (−16.2)	−3.8 (−19.9)	−9.5 (−23.1)
Record low °F (°C)	−22 (−30)	−25 (−32)	−10 (−23)	3 (−16)	16 (−9)	22 (−6)	35 (2)	24 (−4)	16 (−9)	−4 (−20)	−16 (−27)	−26 (−32)	−26 (−32)
Average precipitation inches (mm)	0.77 (20)	0.90 (23)	1.00 (25)	1.09 (28)	1.29 (33)	0.71 (18)	0.70 (18)	0.71 (18)	0.83 (21)	1.07 (27)	0.76 (19)	0.77 (20)	10.60 (269)
Average snowfall inches (cm)	8.4 (21)	9.5 (24)	3.9 (9.9)	2.3 (5.8)	0.0 (0.0)	0.0 (0.0)	0.0 (0.0)	0.0 (0.0)	0.0 (0.0)	0.9 (2.3)	4.8 (12)	6.6 (17)	36.4 (92)
Average precipitation days (≥ 0.01 in)	5.6	5.7	6.3	7.1	7.7	3.8	4.1	4.7	4.2	4.7	4.9	4.8	63.6
Average snowy days (≥ 0.1 in)	3.9	3.5	2.5	1.1	0.0	0.0	0.0	0.0	0.0	0.5	2.4	3.6	17.5
Source 1: NOAA
Source 2: National Weather Service

== History ==
The Vernon area was settled beginning in 1857. The community has the name of Joseph Vernon, a pioneer settler. In 1934, a very large incorporated town called Onaqui was created in the area, including Vernon as well as the settlements of Clover and St. John. Vernon was far from the rest of Onaqui, and locals always looked on it as somewhat independent. Vernon residents were granted a petition to incorporate separately on February 22, 1972, and the remaining part of Onaqui was renamed Rush Valley.

== Demographics ==
Historical population
Census	Pop.	Note	%±
1870	111		—
1880	181		63.1%
1890	249		37.6%
1900	196		−21.3%
1910	365		86.2%
1920	275		−24.7%
1930	341		24.0%
1980	181		—
1990	181		0.0%
2000	236		30.4%
2010	243		3.0%
2020	256		5.3%
U.S. Decennial Census

As of the census of 2000, there were 236 people, 77 households, and 59 families residing in the town. The population density was 31.4 people per square mile (12.1/km^{2}). There were 86 housing units at an average density of 11.4 per square mile (4.4/km^{2}). The racial makeup of the town was 94.07% White, 0.42% African American, 0.42% Asian, 2.54% from other races, and 2.54% from two or more races. Hispanic or Latino of any race were 4.66% of the population.

There were 77 households, out of which 42.9% had children under the age of 18 living with them, 68.8% were married couples living together, 7.8% had a female householder with no husband present, and 22.1% were non-families. 20.8% of all households were made up of individuals, and 9.1% had someone living alone who was 65 years of age or older. The average household size was 3.06 and the average family size was 3.62.

In the town, the population was spread out, with 34.7% under the age of 18, 10.2% from 18 to 24, 22.5% from 25 to 44, 21.6% from 45 to 64, and 11.0% who were 65 years of age or older. The median age was 30 years. For every 100 females, there were 91.9 males. For every 100 females age 18 and over, there were 94.9 males.

The median income for a household in the town was $42,500, and the median income for a family was $43,500. Males had a median income of $38,333 versus $22,500 for females. The per capita income for the town was $13,053. About 10.7% of families and 13.2% of the population were below the poverty line, including 21.5% of those under the age of eighteen and 3.8% of those 65 or over.

== See also ==
- List of cities and towns in Utah
- Harker Canyon
