= National Register of Historic Places listings in Tooele County, Utah =

Location of Tooele County in Utah

This is a list of the National Register of Historic Places listings in Tooele County, Utah.

This is intended to be a complete list of the properties and districts on the National Register of Historic Places in Tooele County, Utah, United States. Latitude and longitude coordinates are provided for many National Register properties and districts; these locations may be seen together in a map.

There are 31 properties listed on the National Register in the county, including 1 National Historic Landmark.

This National Park Service list is complete through NPS recent listings posted July 31, 2026.

== Current listings ==
	Name on the Register	Image	Date listed	Location	City or town	Description
1	Anderson-Clark Farmstead	Anderson-Clark Farmstead	February 3, 2006 (#05001627)	378 W. Clark St. 40°36′10″N 112°28′37″W	Grantsville	
2	Benson Mill	Benson Mill	April 14, 1972 (#72001260)	325 S. State Route 138; 40°39′03″N 112°17′47″W	Stansbury Park	
3	Black Rock Site	Black Rock Site	March 24, 2021 (#100006332)	2.5 miles (4.0 km) west of jct. UT 202 and I 80; 40°43′30″N 112°13′40″W	Lake Point vicinity	Black Rock and the foundation ruins of Black Rock Resort. Listed area extends into Salt Lake County.
4	Bonneville Salt Flats Race Track	Bonneville Salt Flats Race Track	December 18, 1975 (#75001826)	3 miles (4.8 km) east of Wendover off Interstate 80; 40°47′41″N 113°47′37″W	Wendover	
5	Peter Clegg House	Peter Clegg House	September 30, 2019 (#100004483)	8 South 100 East; 40°31′49″N 112°17′45″W	Tooele	
6	Clover Ward LDS Meetinghouse		July 15, 2025 (#100012012)	630 S. West Shambip Rd. 40°20′20″N 112°27′41″W	Rush Valley	
7	Danger Cave	Danger Cave	October 15, 1966 (#66000741)	Northeast of Wendover off Interstate 80; 40°44′58″N 114°00′51″W	Wendover	
8	David E. Davis House	David E. Davis House	November 8, 2007 (#07001172)	400 E. State Route 199; 40°20′14″N 112°26′10″W	Rush Valley	
9	Hilda Erickson House	Hilda Erickson House	July 11, 2006 (#05001626)	247 W. Main St. 40°35′59″N 112°28′15″W	Grantsville	
10	GAPA Launch Site and Blockhouse		August 26, 1980 (#80003972)	Northeast of Knolls; 40°49′41″N 113°12′07″W	Knolls	
11	Grantsville First Ward Meetinghouse	Grantsville First Ward Meetinghouse	February 11, 1982 (#82004165)	297 W. Clark St. 40°36′07″N 112°28′21″W	Grantsville	
12	Grantsville School and Meetinghouse	Grantsville School and Meetinghouse	December 13, 1995 (#95001432)	90 N. Cooley St. 40°36′08″N 112°28′22″W	Grantsville	
13	Iosepa Settlement Cemetery	Iosepa Settlement Cemetery	August 12, 1971 (#71000856)	Skull Valley; 40°32′25″N 112°43′57″W	Iosepa	
14	Johnson Hall-Deseret Mercantile Building	Johnson Hall-Deseret Mercantile Building	February 3, 2006 (#05001628)	4 W. Main St. 40°36′00″N 112°27′49″W	Grantsville	
15	Alex and Mary Alice Johnson House	Alex and Mary Alice Johnson House	December 13, 1995 (#95001433)	5 W. Main St. 40°35′59″N 112°27′47″W	Grantsville	
16	The Kirk Hotel	The Kirk Hotel	January 21, 2020 (#100004880)	57 West Vine St. 40°31′49″N 112°18′01″W	Tooele	Hotel built in 1927-28.
17	Lawrence Brothers and Company Store	Lawrence Brothers and Company Store	October 16, 2013 (#13000842)	31 E. Main St. 40°22′09″N 112°15′23″W	Ophir	
18	Lincoln Highway Bridge	Lincoln Highway Bridge	May 21, 1975 (#75001825)	In Ditto Area on 2nd St. over Government Creek, just south of Tucker St. 40°10′58″N 112°55′23″W	Dugway Proving Ground	
19	Ophir Town Hall	Ophir Town Hall	June 9, 1983 (#83003193)	57 E. Main St. 40°22′12″N 112°15′15″W	Ophir	
20	Reddick Hotel-Ophir LDS Meetinghouse	Reddick Hotel-Ophir LDS Meetinghouse	September 27, 2016 (#16000680)	2nd bldg. W. of Moore St., S. Side of Main St. 40°22′11″N 112°15′19″W	Ophir	
21	John T. Rich House	John T. Rich House	May 2, 1984 (#84002423)	275 W. Clark St. 40°36′07″N 112°28′18″W	Grantsville	
22	John C. Sharp House	John C. Sharp House	July 13, 1984 (#84002424)	Off State Route 36; 40°05′16″N 112°26′03″W	Vernon	
23	Soldier Creek Kilns	Soldier Creek Kilns	August 19, 1980 (#80003973)	Address Restricted	Stockton	
24	Stockton Jail	Stockton Jail	May 9, 1985 (#85000965)	38 W. Clark St. 40°27′14″N 112°21′47″W	Stockton	
25	Stockton School	Stockton School	December 31, 2018 (#100003269)	18 N. Johnson St. 40°27′05″N 112°21′36″W	Stockton	Built 1912, currently houses Stockton Town Hall
26	Tooele Carnegie Library	Tooele Carnegie Library	October 29, 1984 (#84000420)	47 E. Vine St. 40°31′52″N 112°17′48″W	Tooele	
27	Tooele City Downtown Historic District		July 28, 2023 (#100009199)	201 North to 154 South Main St., 24-30 West 100 South, 96 West to 48 East Vine St. 40°31′51″N 112°17′55″W	Tooele	
28	Tooele County Courthouse and City Hall	Tooele County Courthouse and City Hall	July 21, 1983 (#83003194)	41 E. Vine St. 40°31′52″N 112°17′49″W	Tooele	
29	Tooele Valley Railroad Complex	Tooele Valley Railroad Complex	May 17, 1984 (#84002426)	35 N. Broadway; 40°31′52″N 112°17′17″W	Tooele	
30	Wendover Air Force Base	Wendover Air Force Base	July 1, 1975 (#75001827)	South Wendover (via 1st Street); 40°43′14″N 114°01′29″W	Wendover	
31	James and Penninah Wrathall House	James and Penninah Wrathall House	February 3, 2006 (#05001629)	5 N. Center St. 40°36′01″N 112°28′10″W	Grantsville	

== See also ==
- List of National Historic Landmarks in Utah
- National Register of Historic Places listings in Utah
