= Wrathall =

Wrathall is a surname. It may refer to:

- Bill Wrathall (1931–1995), New Zealand cartoonist
- Frank Wrathall (born 1986), British motor racing driver
- Harry Wrathall (1869–1944), English cricketer
- John Wrathall (1913–1978), Rhodesian politician
- John Wrathall (footballer), New Zealand football player
- Mark Wrathall (born 1965), professor of philosophy
- John Wrathall Bull (1804–1886), early settler of South Australia, inventor and author

See also: James and Penninah Wrathall House
