= Ophir Town Hall =

- U.S. National Register of Historic Places
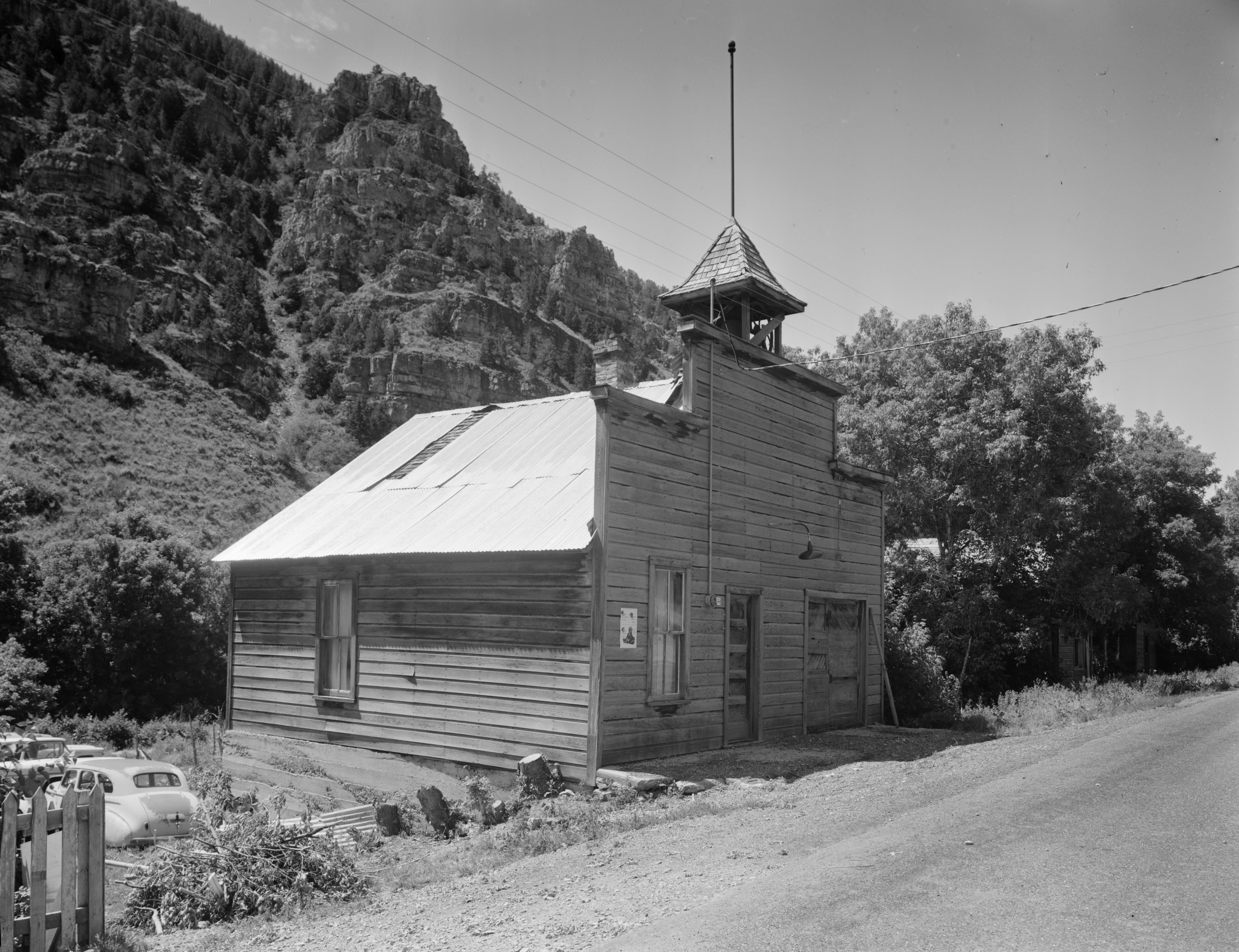
- HABS photo of building in 1967

- Location within Utah Location within the United States
- Location: 57 East Main Street; Ophir, Utah; United States
- Coordinates: 40°22′12″N 112°15′10″W
- Area: less than one acre
- Built: c.1870
- NRHP reference No.: 83003193
- Added to NRHP: June 9, 1983

The Ophir Town Hall, located at 57 East Main Street in Ophir, Utah, United States, was built in c.1870. It was listed on the National Register of Historic Places in 1983.

== Description ==
At the time of its NRHP nomination, it was deemed significant as one of only three mining town city halls in Utah that had survived from the 1800s. It is older than the 1884 Park City City Hall (in the Park City Main Street Historic District) and the 1899 Eureka City Hall in the Eureka City Historic District) and is unique as a false-fronted frame building.

It has served as a correctional facility, as a meeting hall, as a city hall, and as a fire station.

It was documented by the Historic American Buildings Survey in 1967.

== See also ==
- National Register of Historic Places listings in Tooele County, Utah
