= Charcoal Kilns (Eureka, Utah) =

- U.S. National Register of Historic Places
- Location within Utah Location within the United States
- Nearest city: Eureka, Utah
- Coordinates: 39°58′25″N 112°4′0″W
- Area: less than one acre
- MPS: Tintic Mining District MRA
- NRHP reference No.: 79003491
- Added to NRHP: March 14, 1979

The Charcoal Kilns near Eureka, Utah were listed on the National Register of Historic Places in 1979. The listing included two charcoal kilns that each are about six feet in diameter and four feet deep, built out of stone. They are believed to have been built or used to support the Wyoming Smelter in 1871.

== See also ==
- Beck No. 2 Mine, Eureka, Utah, NRHP-listed
- Lime Kilns, Eureka, Utah, NRHP-listed
- Soldier Creek Kilns, Stockton, Utah, NRHP-listed
- Frisco Charcoal Kilns, Milford, Utah, NRHP-listed
