= Grantsville First Ward Meetinghouse =

Historic church in Utah, United States

- U.S. National Register of Historic Places
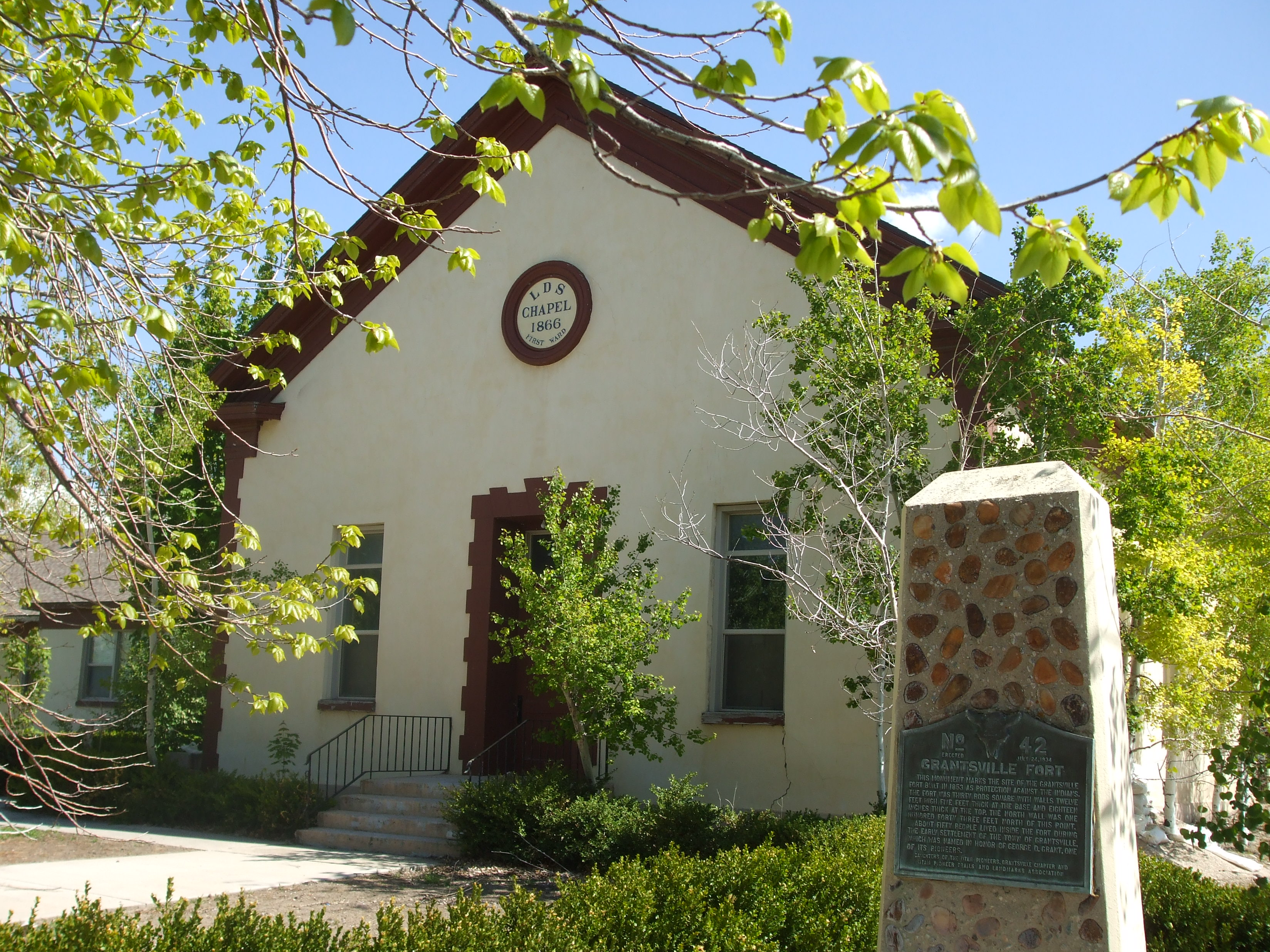
- The Grantsville First Ward Meetinghouse, May 2010

- Location within Utah Location within the United States
- Location: 297 Clark Street; Grantsville, Utah; United States
- Coordinates: 40°36′7″N 112°28′21″W
- Area: less than one acre
- Built: 1865-66
- Built by: Gillespie, Hugh Alexander Ross
- Architectural style: Greek Revival
- NRHP reference No.: 82004165
- Added to NRHP: February 11, 1982

The Grantsville First Ward Meetinghouse, in Grantsville, Utah, United States, is a meeting house of the Church of Jesus Christ of Latter-day Saints (Church) which was built in 1865–1866. It was listed on the National Register of Historic Places in 1982; the listing did not include a 1952 addition to the building.

== Description ==
The church building is located at 297 Clark Street and was a work of Scottish immigrant Hugh Alexander Ross Gillespie.

It is notable as one of few Church meetinghouses built with adobe and having Greek Revival styling that still survive. This one is especially notable for having its vestry attached to the rear rather than to the front of the meetinghouse.

== See also ==
- National Register of Historic Places listings in Tooele County, Utah
