= Johnson Hall–Deseret Mercantile Building =

- U.S. National Register of Historic Places
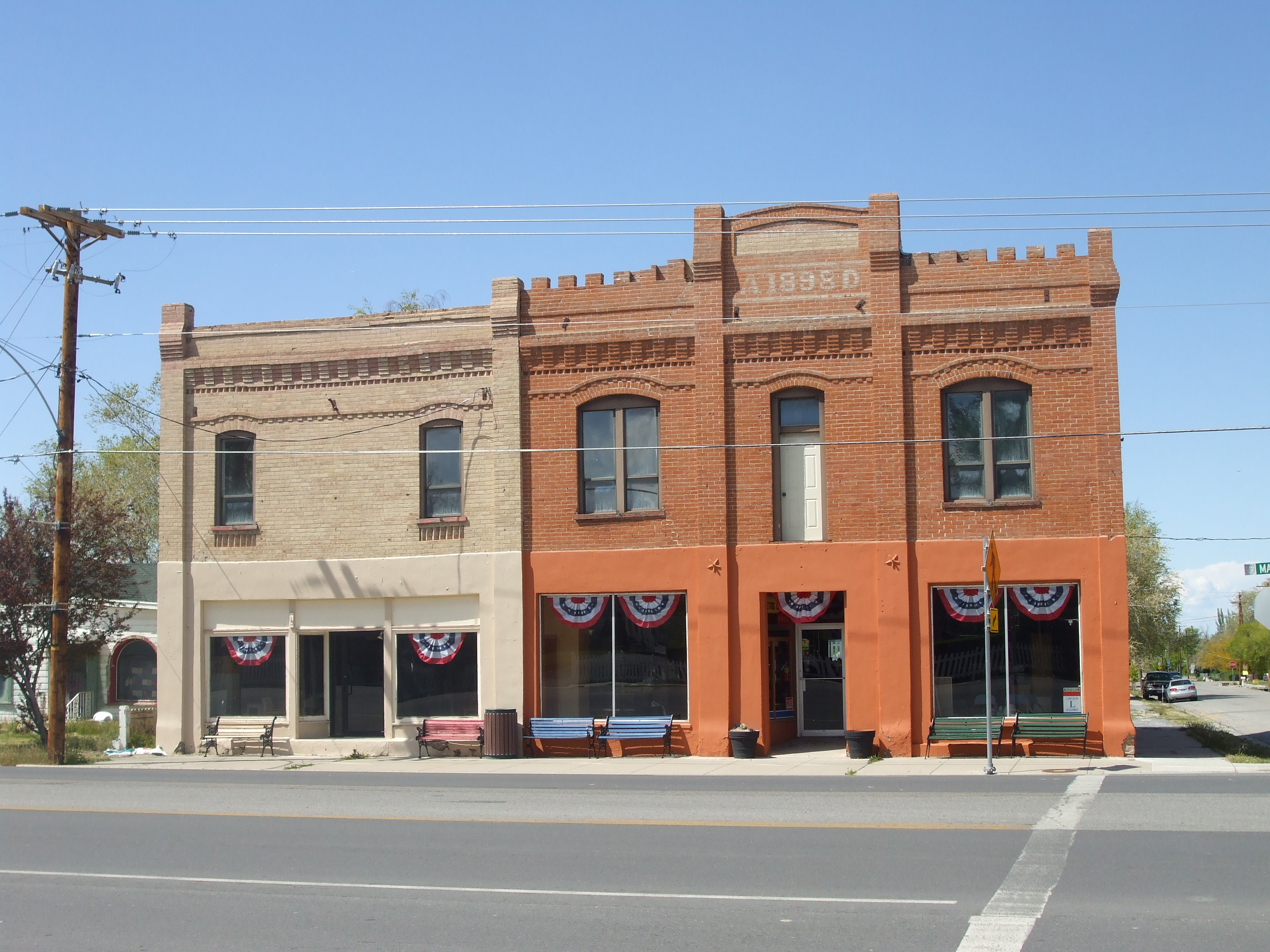
- Building in May 2010

- Location within Utah Location within the United States
- Location: 4 West Main Street; Grantsville, Utah; United States
- Coordinates: 40°36′0″N 112°27′49″W
- Area: less than one acre
- Built: c.1890 and c.1898
- Built by: Jensen, James
- MPS: Grantsville, Utah MPS
- NRHP reference No.: 05001628
- Added to NRHP: February 3, 2006

The Johnson Hall–Deseret Mercantile Building is a side-by-side pair of buildings in Grantsville, Utah, United States. It has also been known as the Johnson Building, the Grantsville Bank, the Grantsville Post Office, and the Grantsville Drugstore. It was listed on the National Register of Historic Places in 2006.

== Description ==
The buildings, which are located at 4 West Main Street (Utah State Route 138), were constructed in c.1890 and c.1898, and were connected together in 1953.

The building has significant historical associations with multiple periods of Grantsville's history, and "is architecturally significant for a unity of design (although the two buildings were constructed several years apart) and rich detail in the brickwork. The building is an excellent example of Victorian Eclectic ornamentation in a turn-of-the-century commercial block." It was built by contractor/mason James Jensen, a mason and contractor.

== See also ==
- National Register of Historic Places listings in Tooele County, Utah
