= Grantsville School and Meetinghouse =

- U.S. National Register of Historic Places
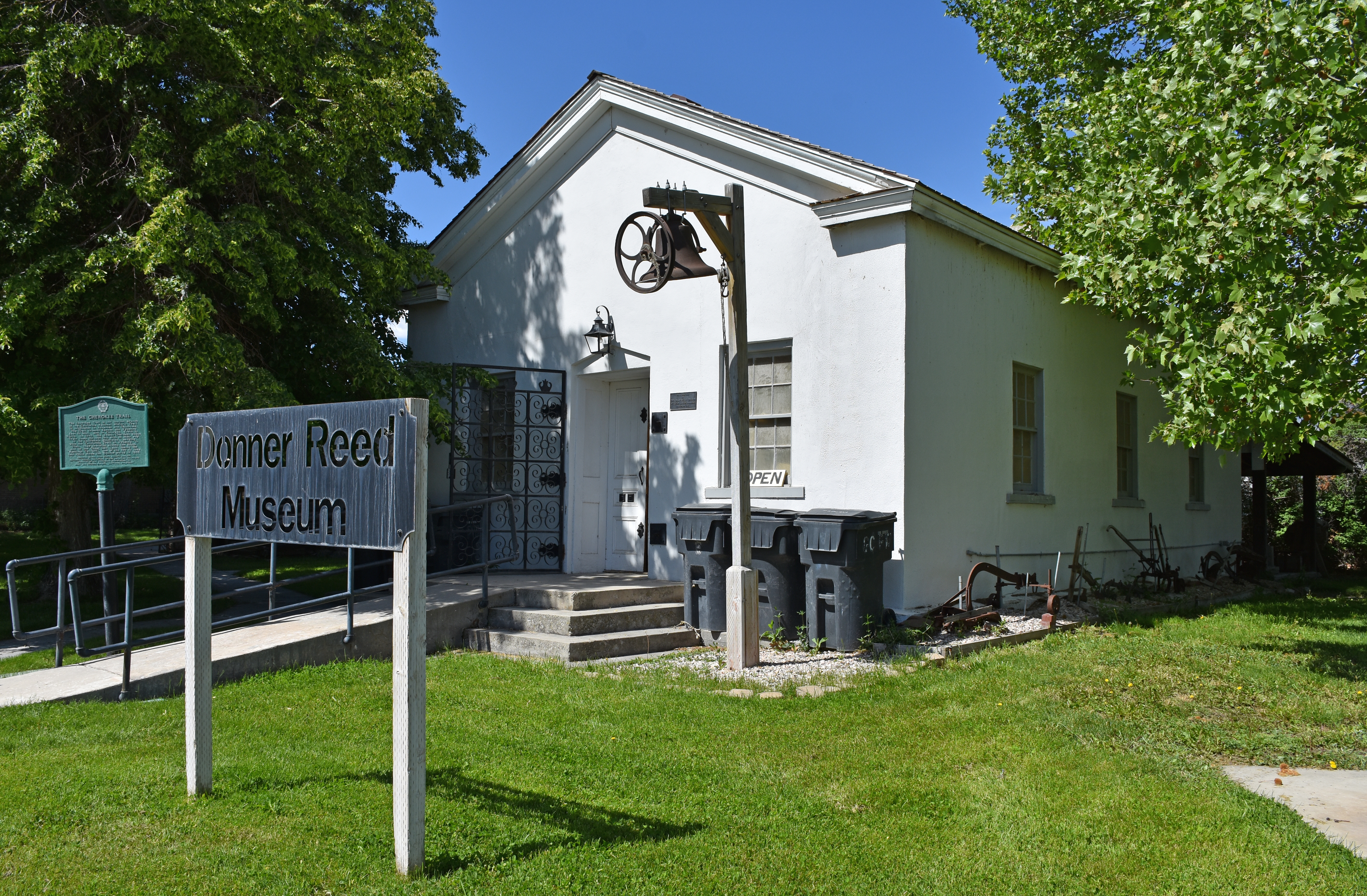
- Donner-Reed Museum

- Location within Utah Location within the United States
- Location: 90 North Cooley Lane; Grantsville, Utah, United States
- Coordinates: 40°36′8″N 112°28′22″W
- Area: less than one acre
- Built: 1861
- Architectural style: Greek Revival
- MPS: Mormon Church Buildings in Utah MPS
- NRHP reference No.: 95001432
- Added to NRHP: December 13, 1995

The Grantsville School and Meetinghouse, located in Grantsville, Utah, United States, dates from 1861. It has also been known as the Grantsville City Hall and the Old Adobe Schoolhouse, and it is now the Donner-Reed Museum. The historic structure was listed on the National Register of Historic Places in 1995.

== Description ==
Starting in 1861, the building served as a school for 30 years; it was used as Grantsville's city hall from 1894 to 1917. It was built of locally made adobe bricks and features Greek Revival style. Its NRHP nomination suggests that since it has been minimally altered since its original construction in 1861, "it is one of the oldest, and perhaps best preserved, schoolhouses in Utah."

J. Reuben Clark had the building restored for Grantsville's centennial celebration in 1950, during which he donated it for use as a meeting hall.

== Donner-Reed Museum ==
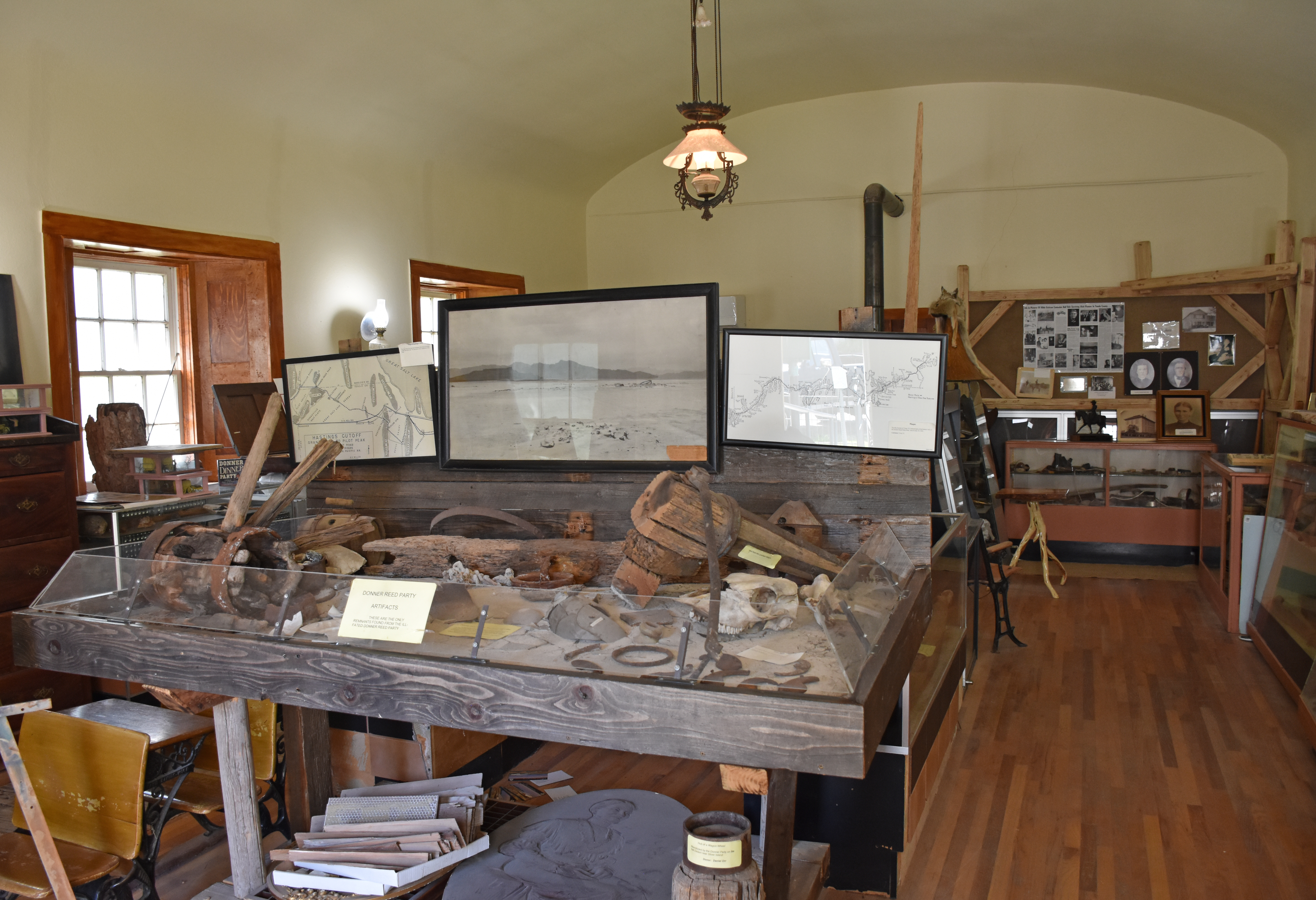
Museum interior

In 1967, the Grantsville City Museum was established in the building. Run by the local Daughters of Utah Pioneers, artifacts placed on display included Mormon pioneer-era relics, pieces related to the Indigenous peoples of the area, and artifacts once belonging to the Donner Party.

Some members of the Donner Party had been forced to abandon wagons while crossing the Great Salt Lake Desert in 1846. The wagons and their contents remained in the desert until the twentieth century, when artifacts began to be collected by Charles Kelly, Frank Durfee, Dan Orr, and other locals during several expeditions to the site. These artifacts—including wagon parts, equipment, ox shoes, and other items—were initially placed in Grantsville High School but were transferred to the museum.

The Grantsville City Museum has since evolved into the Donner-Reed Museum; operated by the local Sons of Utah Pioneers, it is open by appointment.

== See also ==
- Donner Memorial State Park
- National Register of Historic Places listings in Tooele County, Utah
