= John T. Rich House =

Historic house in Utah, United States

- U.S. National Register of Historic Places
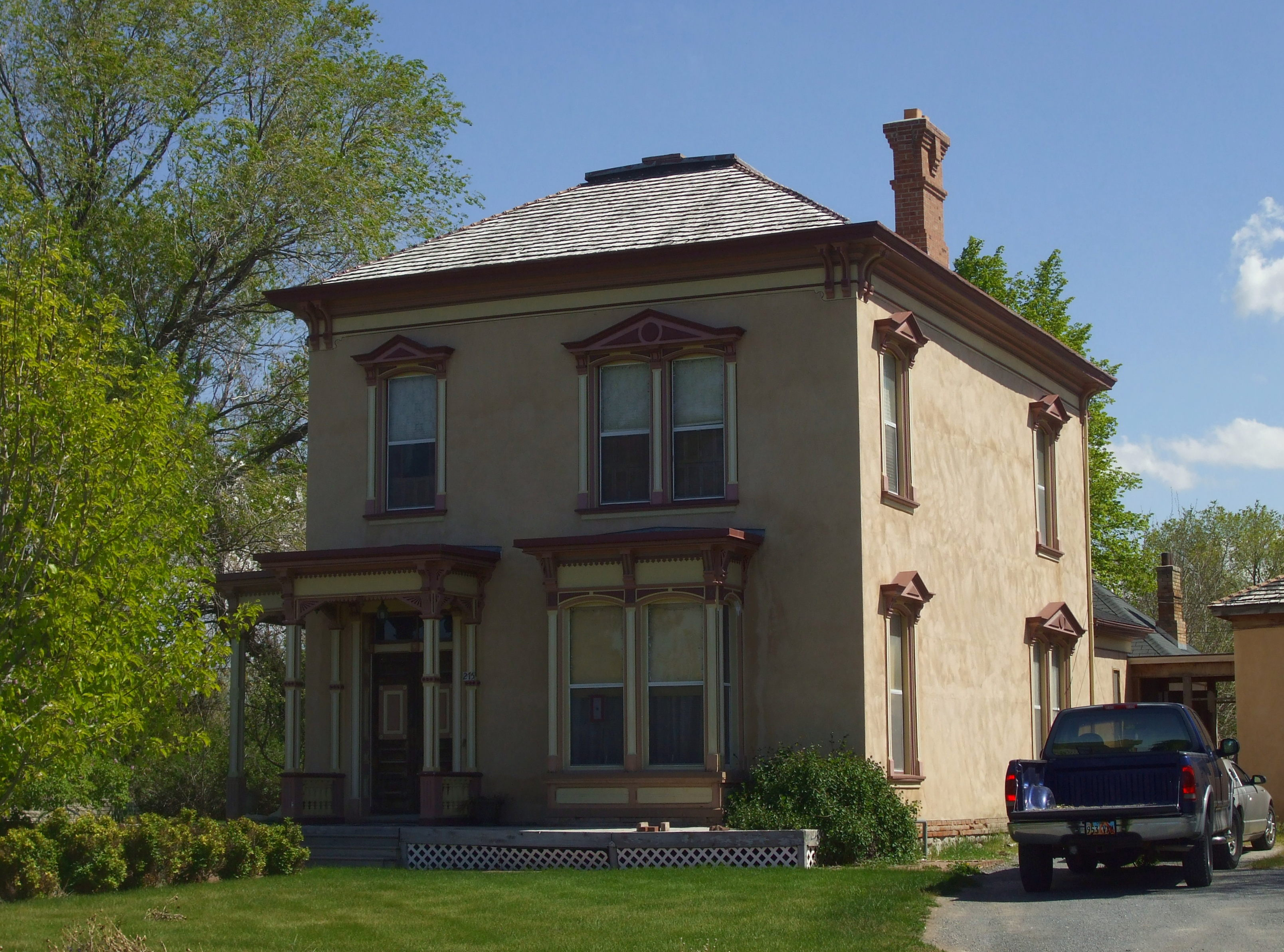
- John T. Rich House, May 2010

- Location within Utah Location within the United States
- Location: 275 West Clark Street; Grantsville, Utah; United States
- Coordinates: 40°36′7″N 112°28′18″W
- Area: 1.3 acres (0.53 ha)
- Built: 1880
- Architectural style: Italianate
- NRHP reference No.: 84002423
- Added to NRHP: May 2, 1984

The John T. Rich House is a historic residence in Grantsville, Utah, United States that is listed on the National Register of Historic Places.

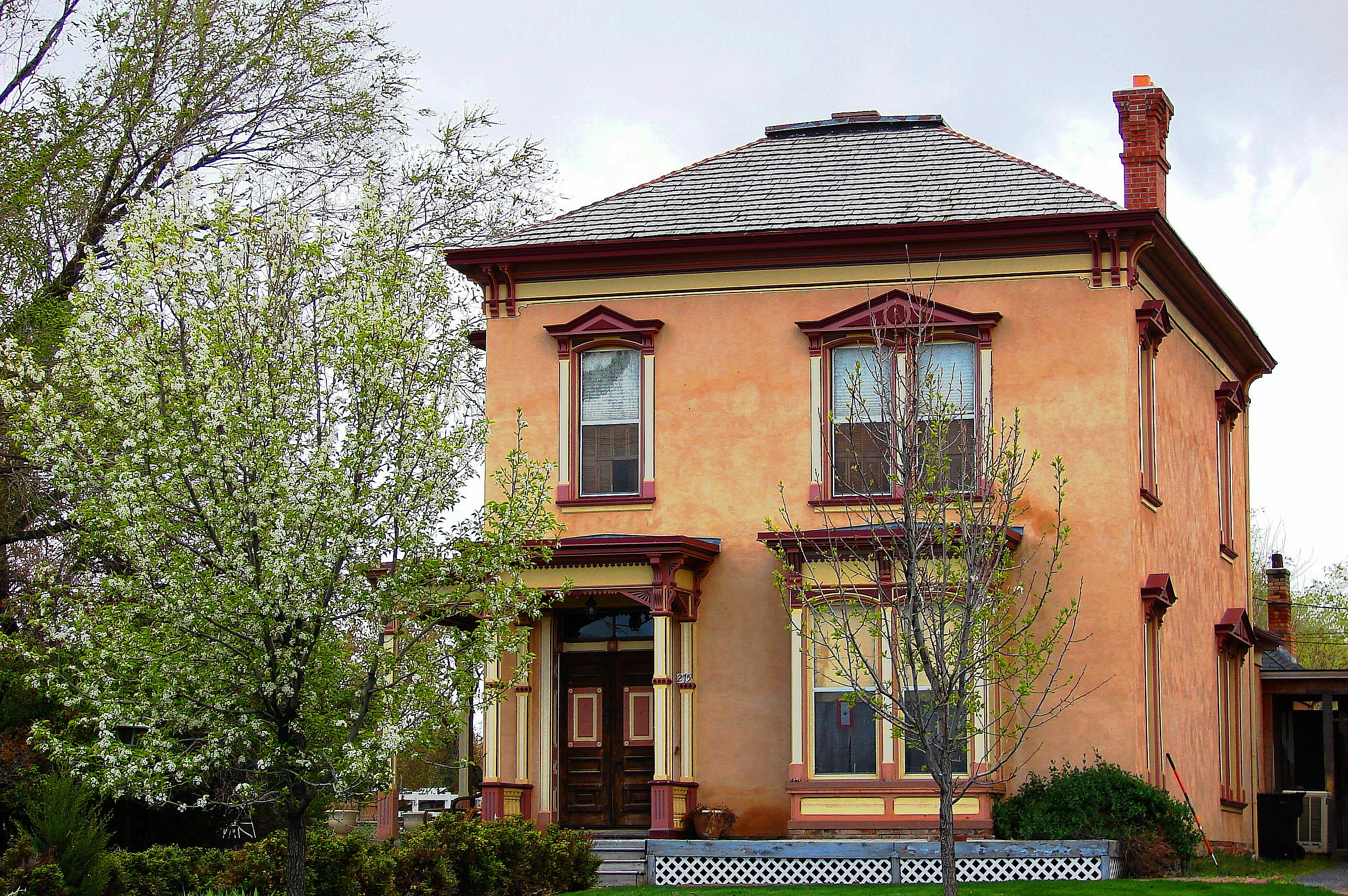
John T. Rich House, April 2009

== Description ==
The house is located at 275 West Clark Street and was built c.1880.

Its NRHP nomination asserted that it was architecturally important as one of just 11 documented surviving Italianate two story box-style houses in Utah, and the only one of those made from adobe.

The house was listed on the National Register of Historic Places in 1984.

== See also ==
- National Register of Historic Places listings in Tooele County, Utah
