= Lawrence Brothers and Company Store =

- U.S. National Register of Historic Places
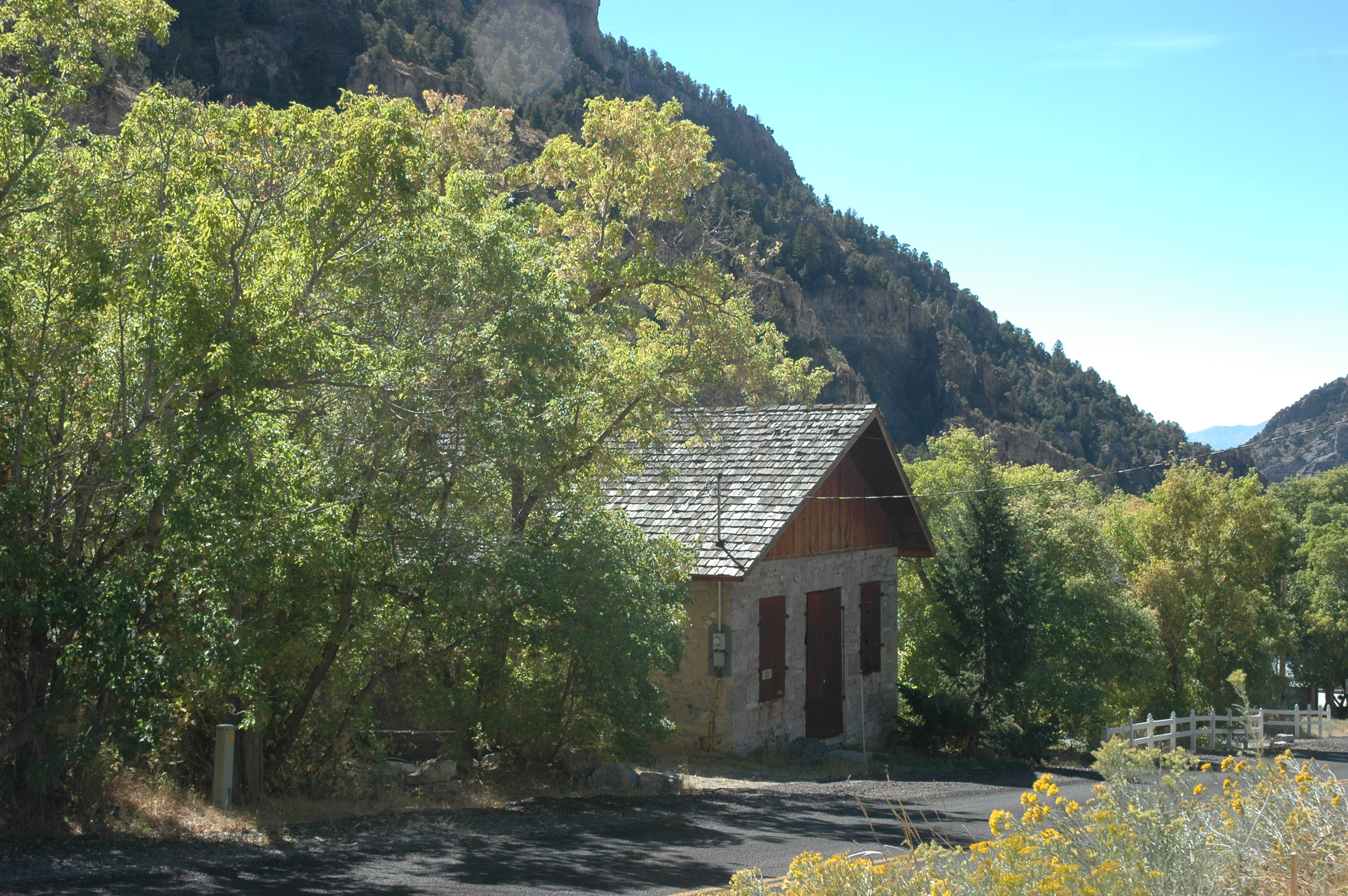
- Lawrence Brothers and Company Store, September 2016

- Location within Utah Location within the United States
- Location: 31 East Main Street; Ophir, Utah
- Coordinates: 40.369167°N 112.256389°W
- Area: .09 acres (0.036 ha)
- Built: 1874
- Built by: Shelby Alfred Lineback
- NRHP reference No.: 13000842
- Added to NRHP: October 16, 2013

The Lawrence Brothers and Company Store (also known as the John Faunce General Store, as Geo. E. Edwards General Merchandise, as Ophir Mercantile Co., and as Morzenti Grocery & Beer Hall) is a historic commercial building in Ophir, Utah, United States, that is listed on the National Register of Historic Places.

== Description ==
The building is located at East Main Street and was built in 1874. It is a one-and-a-half-story stone commercial building which is 26 by 60 feet (7.9 m × 18.3 m) in plan.

It was listed on the National Register of Historic Places in 1980.

== See also ==
- National Register of Historic Places listings in Tooele County, Utah
