= Lime Kilns (Eureka, Utah) =

- U.S. National Register of Historic Places
- Location within Utah Location within the United States
- Nearest city: Eureka, Utah
- Coordinates: 39°58′40″N 112°4′37″W
- Area: less than one acre
- Built: 1920
- MPS: Tintic Mining District MRA
- NRHP reference No.: 79003490
- Added to NRHP: March 14, 1979

The Lime Kilns located at the western end of Homansville Canyon near Eureka, Utah, were part of a lime quarry in the 1920s. The kilns were listed on the National Register of Historic Places in 1979. The listing included one contributing site and two contributing structures: two lime kilns that are approximately 8 feet (2.4 m) in diameter and 30 to 40 feet (9.1 to 12.2 m) deep.

== See also ==
- Beck No. 2 Mine, Eureka, Utah, NRHP-listed
- Charcoal Kilns, Eureka, Utah, NRHP-listed
- Soldier Creek Kilns, Stockton, Utah, NRHP-listed
- Frisco Charcoal Kilns, Milford, Utah, NRHP-listed
