= Alex and Mary Alice Johnson House =

Historic house in Utah, United States

- U.S. National Register of Historic Places
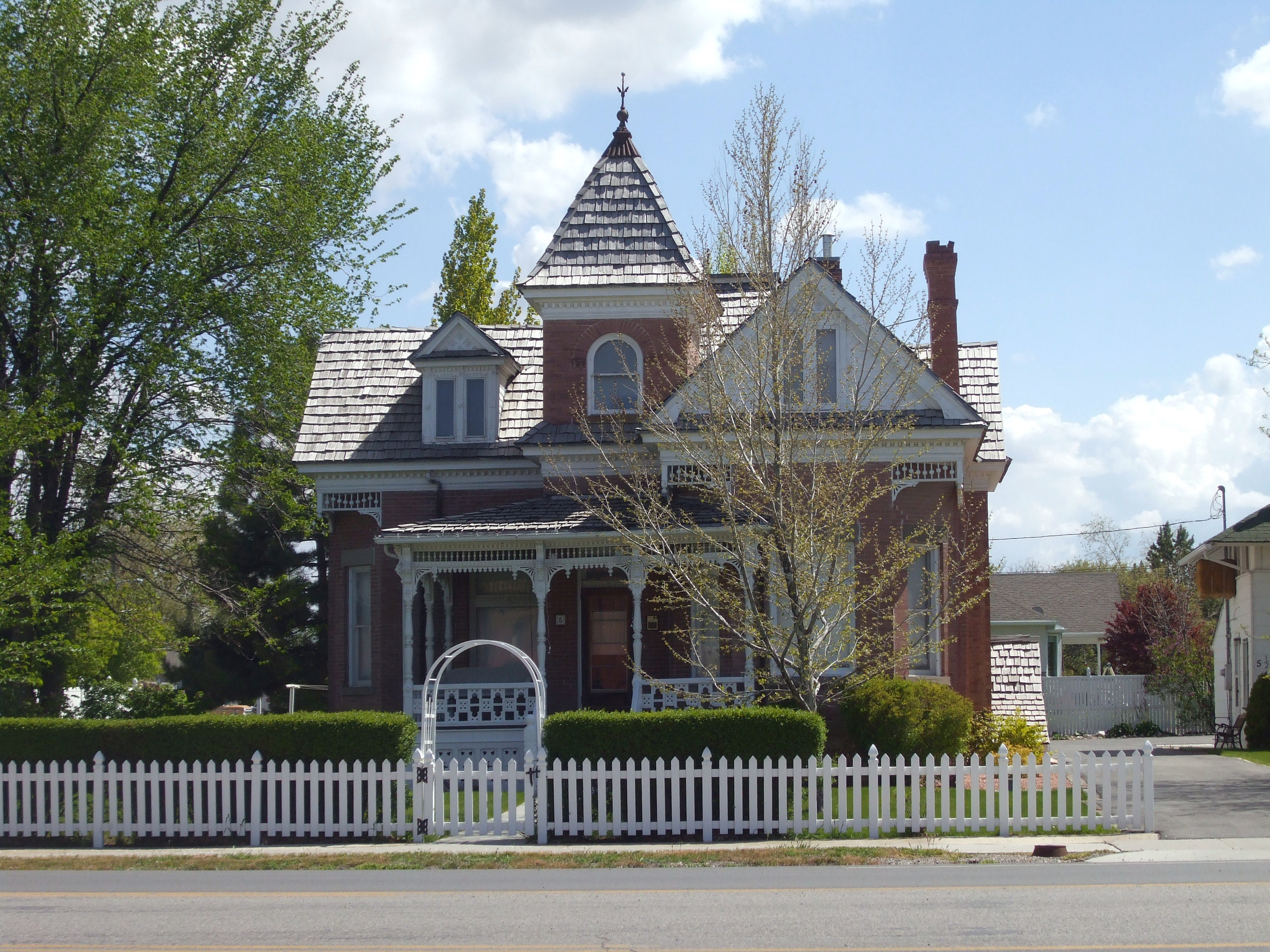

- Location within Utah Location within the United States
- Location: 5 West Main Street; Grantsville, Utah; United States
- Coordinates: 40°35′59″N 112°27′47″W
- Area: less than one acre
- Built: 1900
- Built by: Shaffer, Charles Zaphaniah
- Architectural style: Queen Anne
- NRHP reference No.: 95001433
- Added to NRHP: December 13, 1995

The Alex and Mary Alice Johnson House, is a house in Grantsville, Utah, United States. It was listed on the National Register of Historic Places in 1995.

== Description ==
The house, located at 5 West Main Street, is a Queen Anne style house that was built in 1900. It was built by Charles Zaphaniah Shaffer, a carpenter. It served as a hotel or lodging house during the 1930s and 1940s. As Lone Pine Tourist Home it was often well-occupied, being only 6.5 miles (10.5 km) from Lincoln Highway.

According to its NRHP nomination, it is "an excellent example of the Victorian Queen Anne style" and "is one of the most distinctive architectural landmarks of Grantsville." As of 1995, the house was very well-preserved.

== See also ==
- National Register of Historic Places listings in Tooele County, Utah
