= Beck No. 2 Mine =

- U.S. National Register of Historic Places
- Location within Utah Location within the United States
- Location: Utah County, Utah
- Nearest city: Eureka, Utah
- Coordinates: 39°56′38″N 112°5′48″W
- Area: less than one acre
- Built: 1890
- MPS: Tintic Mining District MRA
- NRHP reference No.: 79003483
- Added to NRHP: March 14, 1979

The Beck No. 2 Mine near Eureka, Utah dates from 1890. It was listed on the National Register of Historic Places in 1979. The listing included "surface plant buildings" of the lead mine (two contributing buildings) and one other contributing structure, a "remaining wooden headframe", described as a "fifty foot wooden headframe A-frame Montana type". These evoke the past mining operations at the site.

== See also ==
- Charcoal Kilns (Eureka, Utah), NRHP-listed
- Lime Kilns (Eureka, Utah), NRHP-listed
