= Reddick Hotel-Ophir LDS Meetinghouse =

- U.S. National Register of Historic Places
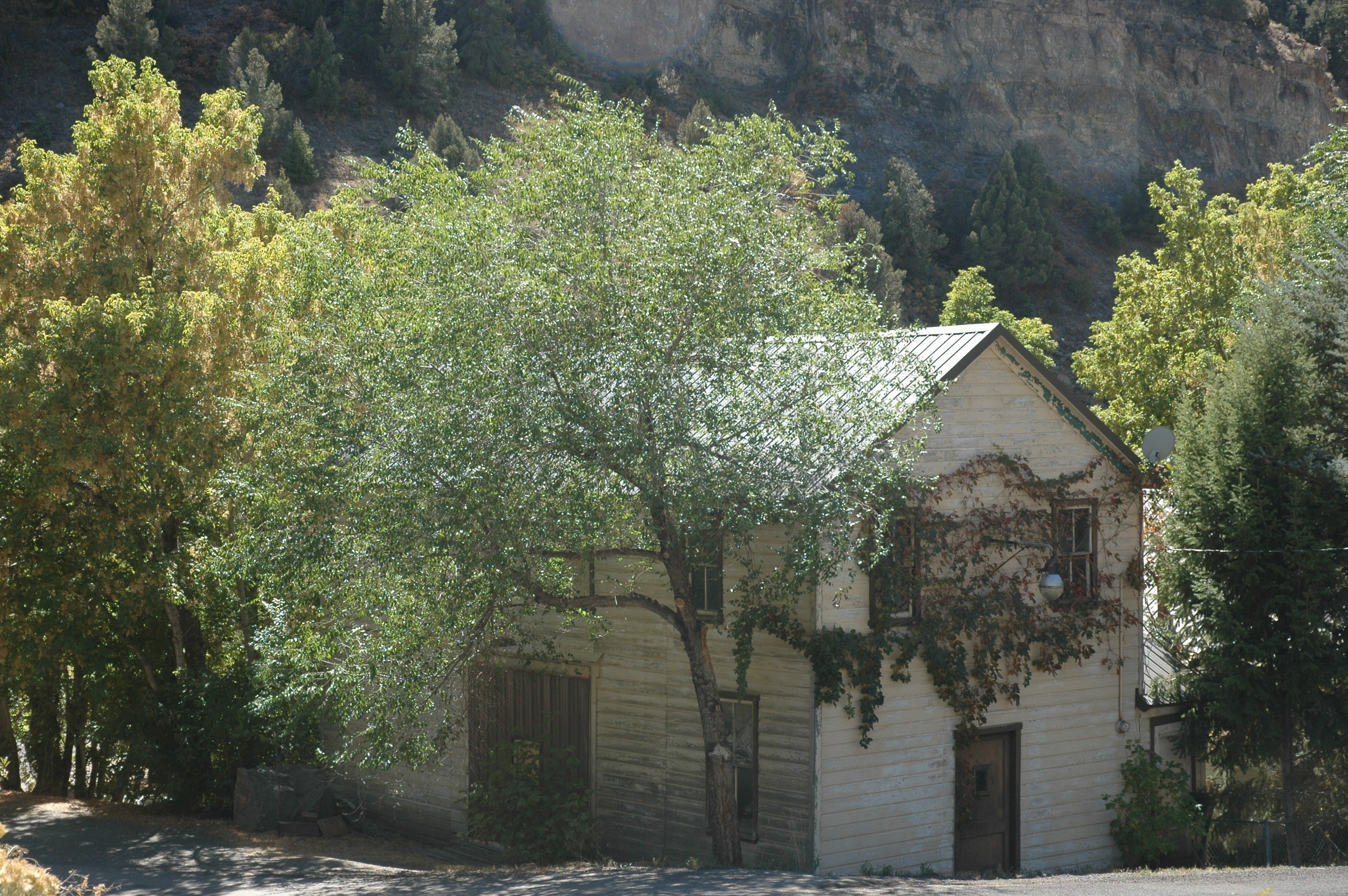

- Location within Utah Location within the United States
- Location: 2nd bldg. W. of Moore St., S. Side of Main St., Ophir, Utah
- Coordinates: 40.369583°N 112.255278°W
- Built: 1903-04
- NRHP reference No.: 16000680
- Added to NRHP: September 27, 2016

The Reddick Hotel-Ophir LDS Meetinghouse in Ophir, Utah, also known as Reddick Boarding House and as Howard's Shop, was built in 1903–1904. It was listed on the National Register of Historic Places in 2016.

According to its NRHP nomination, it was deemed significant "as one of only two frame commercial buildings associated with the town’s efforts to transform from a boom-&-bust mining camp to a more stable community. Between 1903 and 1924, the Reddick Hotel made important contributions to the community as one of two hotel/boarding houses in operation. The Reddick Hotel was a rare woman owned business in the mining town. The building is particularly associated with a single event: the murder of Mary Reddick by her husband and his subsequent suicide in 1916."
