= Soldier Creek Kilns =

- U.S. National Register of Historic Places
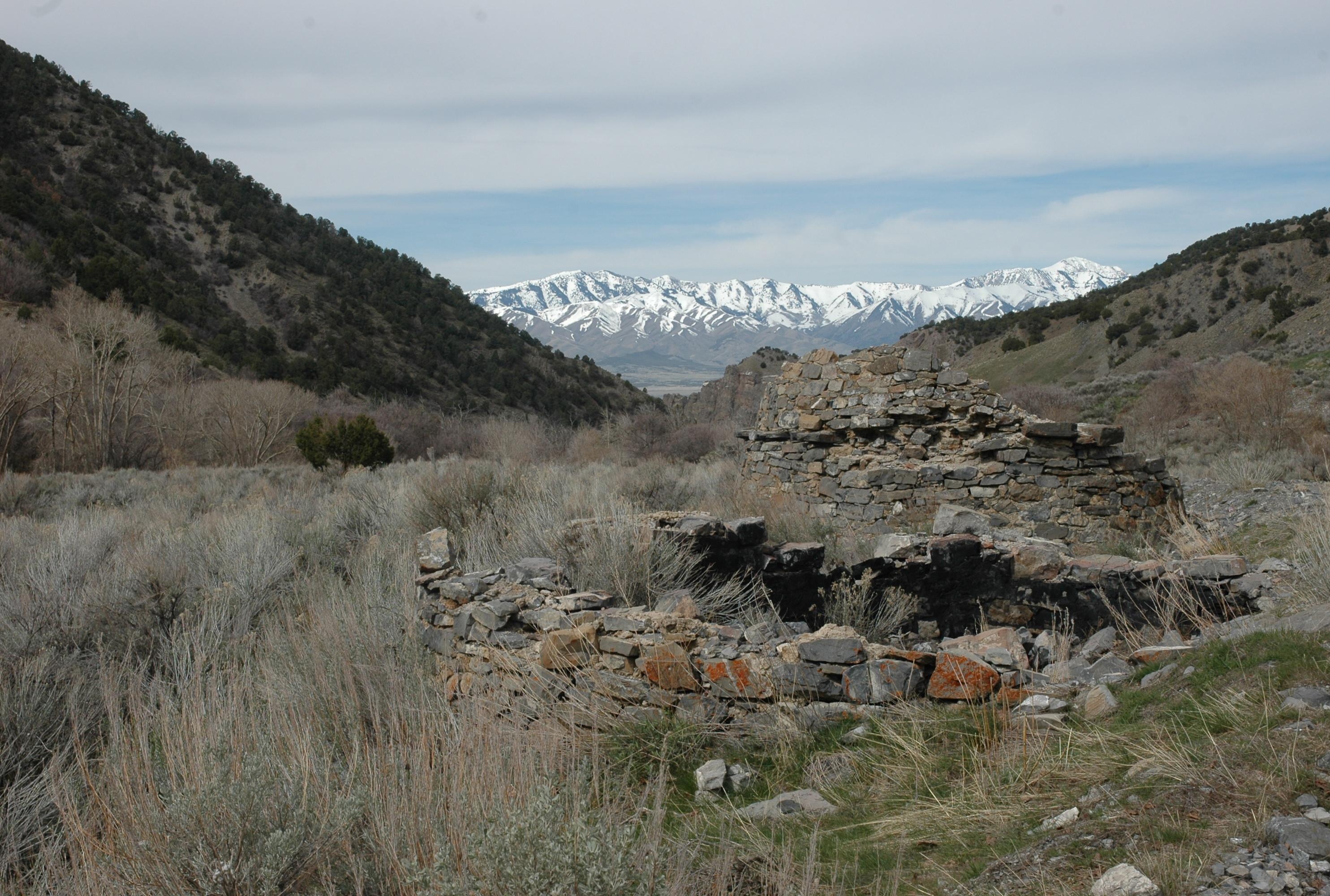
- Waterman Coking Ovens
- Nearest city: Stockton, Utah
- Area: 30 acres (12 ha)
- Built: Approx 1873
- NRHP reference No.: 80003973
- Added to NRHP: August 19, 1980

The Soldier Creek Kilns near Stockton, Utah date from about 1873, the time of their construction, and were in use up until about 1899. Also known as the Waterman Coking Ovens, they were listed on the National Register of Historic Places (NRHP) in 1980. The listing included 14 contributing structures over 30 acres (12 ha).

The site includes four smelting kilns which document smelting technology brought from California and from the eastern U.S. One of the four, the best-preserved, is an eastern beehive-type parabolic-shaped kiln, that would hold more than 10 cords of wood and would be tended from two iron doors.

In 1996, it was argued that these were worth preserving.

The location of the site is not disclosed; they are listed as "Address Restricted", as is done for archeological resources that may be damaged and lose their information potential, if not protected.

== See also ==
- Lime Kilns, Eureka, Utah, NRHP-listed
- Charcoal Kilns, Eureka, Utah, NRHP-listed
- Frisco Charcoal Kilns, Milford, Utah, NRHP-listed
