= Hilda Erickson House =

Historic house in Utah, United States

- U.S. National Register of Historic Places
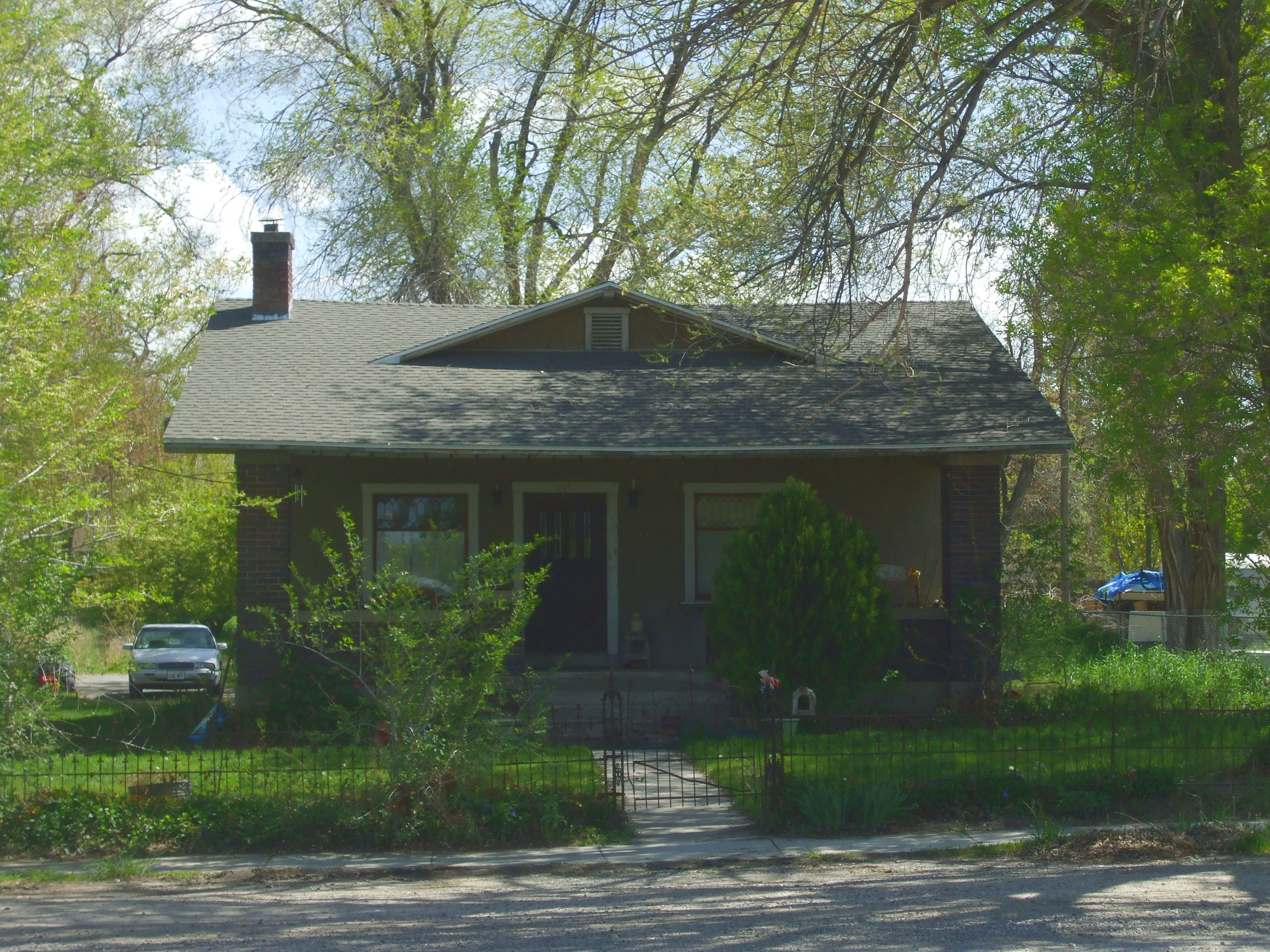
- 2010 photo

- Location within Utah Location within the United States
- Location: 247 W. Main St., Grantsville, Utah
- Coordinates: 40°35′59″N 112°28′15″W
- Area: less than one acre
- Built: 1915
- Built by: Erickson, Perry
- Architectural style: Bungalow/Craftsman
- MPS: Grantsville, Utah MPS
- NRHP reference No.: 05001626
- Added to NRHP: July 11, 2006

The Hilda Erickson House, located at 247 W. Main St. in Grantsville, Utah, is a historic house that was built in 1915 for Hilda Erickson, an exceptionally long-lived woman among original pioneers in Utah. The house was built by her son Perry Erickson, and it has also been known as the Perry & Mary Erickson House and as the John & Hilda Erickson House.

It is historically significant for association with Hilda Anderson Erickson, who lived in the house till past age 100. Hilda was born in Ledsjö parish, Västergötland, Sweden in 1859, came to Utah by wagon in 1866, and was eventually honored by local and national news coverage "as the 'last living pioneer,' out of approximately 80,000 pioneers who came to Utah before the railroad". She died at age 108, in 1968.

The house is a bungalow that is well-preserved but is not special architecturally. It was listed on the National Register of Historic Places in 2006.

Its historical significance was considered by local, state, and national officials who deemed it worthy of recognition in the National Register program, which was established in 1966 and has since recognized about 85,000 historic sites in the United States. There are just 23 NRHP-recognized sites in all 7,287 square miles of Tooele County, the county in which the Erickson house is located, i.e. there is 1 site per 316 square miles recognized in the area.
