= Hilda Anderson Erickson =

Mormon pioneer

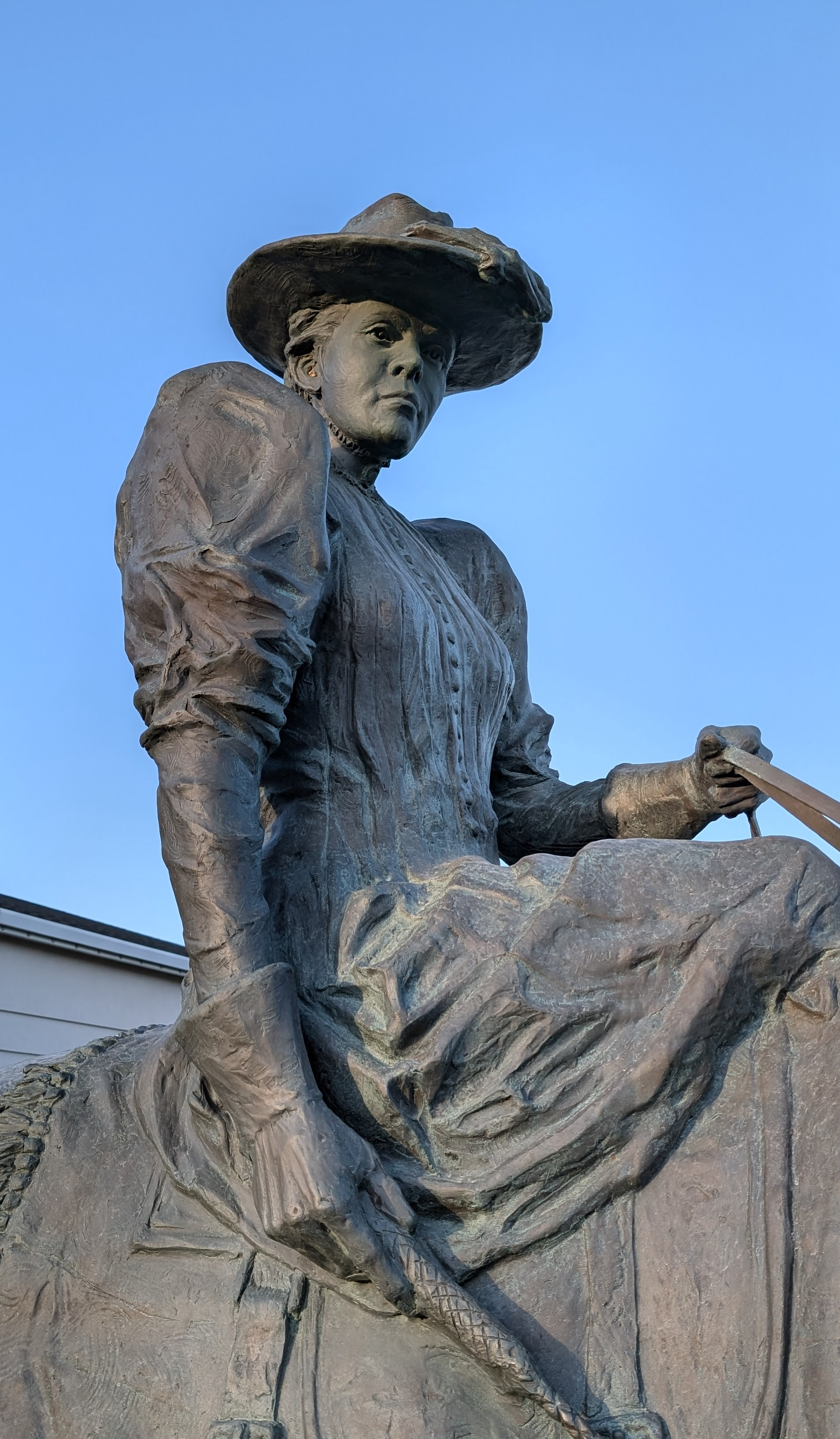
- Born: Hilda Andersson; November 11, 1859; Ledsjo, Sweden
- Died: January 1, 1968 (aged 108); Salt Lake City, Utah, U.S.
- Occupations: Seamstress, Obstetrician, Dentist, Store Keeper
- Known for: Oldest Living Utah Pioneer

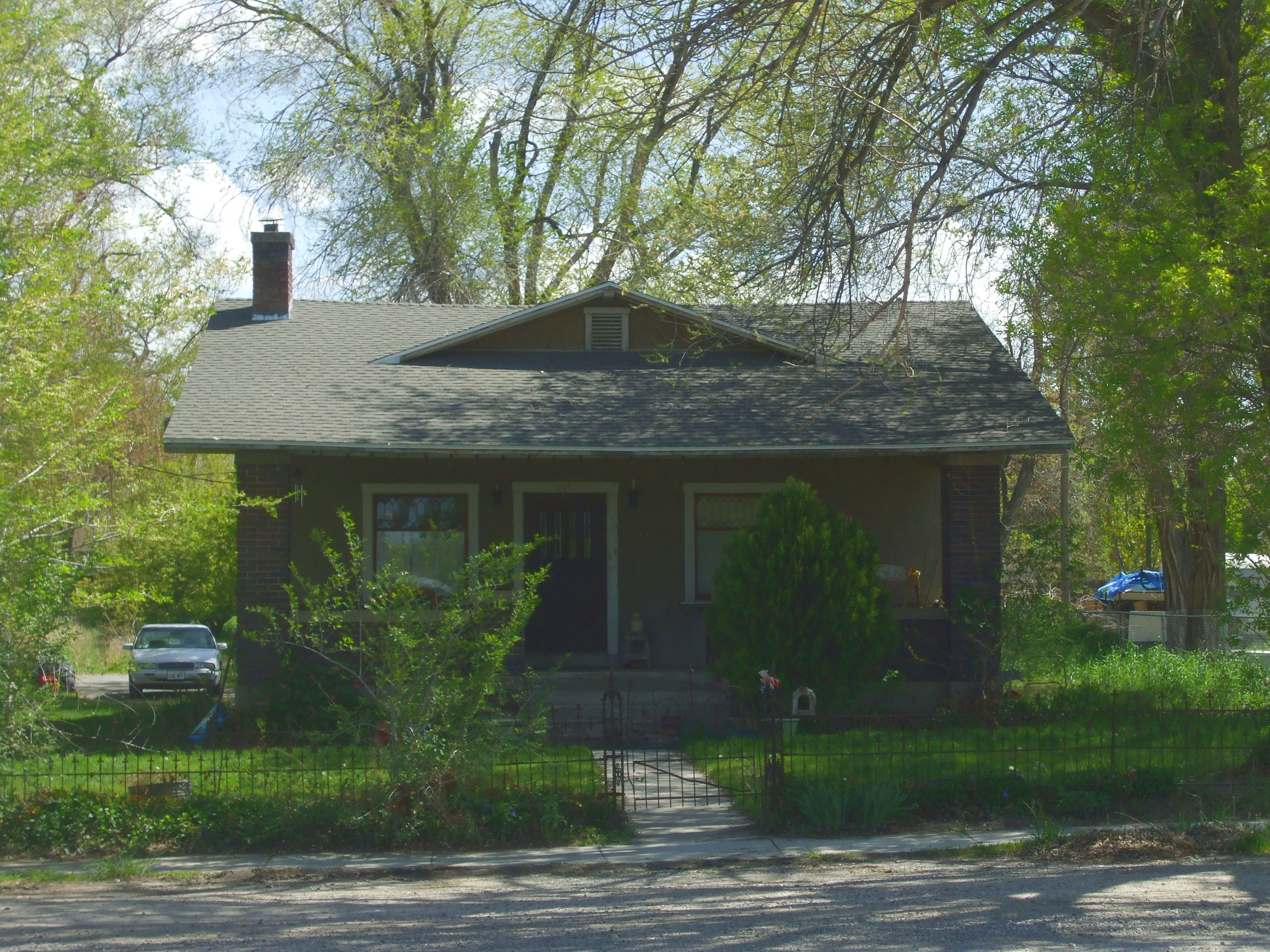
Hilda Erickson House, Grantsville Utah

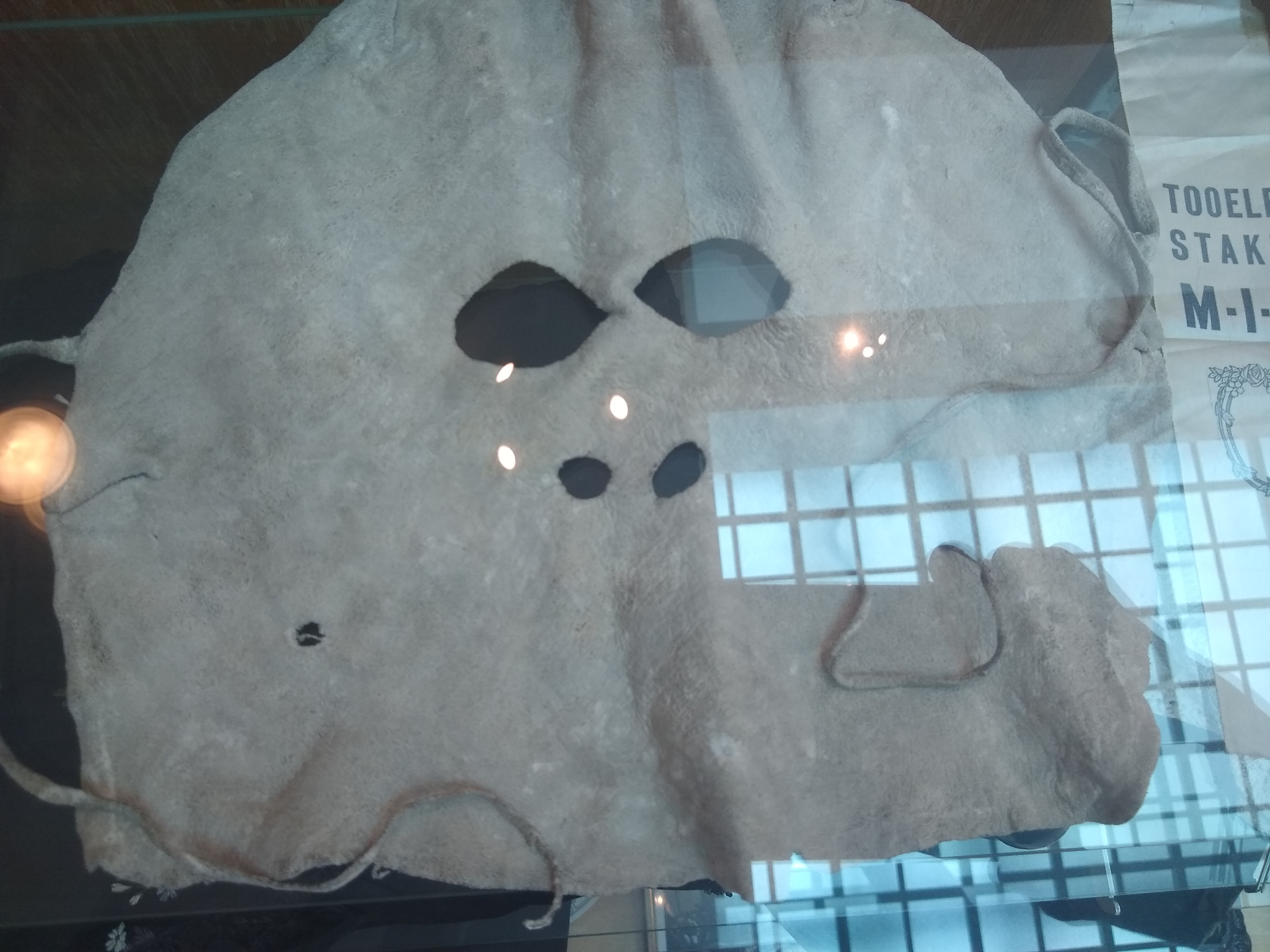
Hilda Anderson wore this buckskin mask to protect her face when crossing the desert. Located in the Daughters of the Utah Pioneers Museum

Hilda Anderson Erickson was the last known surviving Mormon pioneer and celebrated frontierswoman. She was six and half years old in 1866 when her family emigrated from Ledsjo, Sweden to Tooele County in Utah. She died at the age of 108 on January 1, 1968.

== Personal life ==
Erickson was known for her love of dance and horseback riding.

After a 2 year long engagement, Hilda Anderson married John Erickson. Soon after their marriage they were called to serve a full time mission with the Gosiute Indians, near the Nevada border in Deep Creek, in which they helped the Gosiute Indians farm in the desert environment.

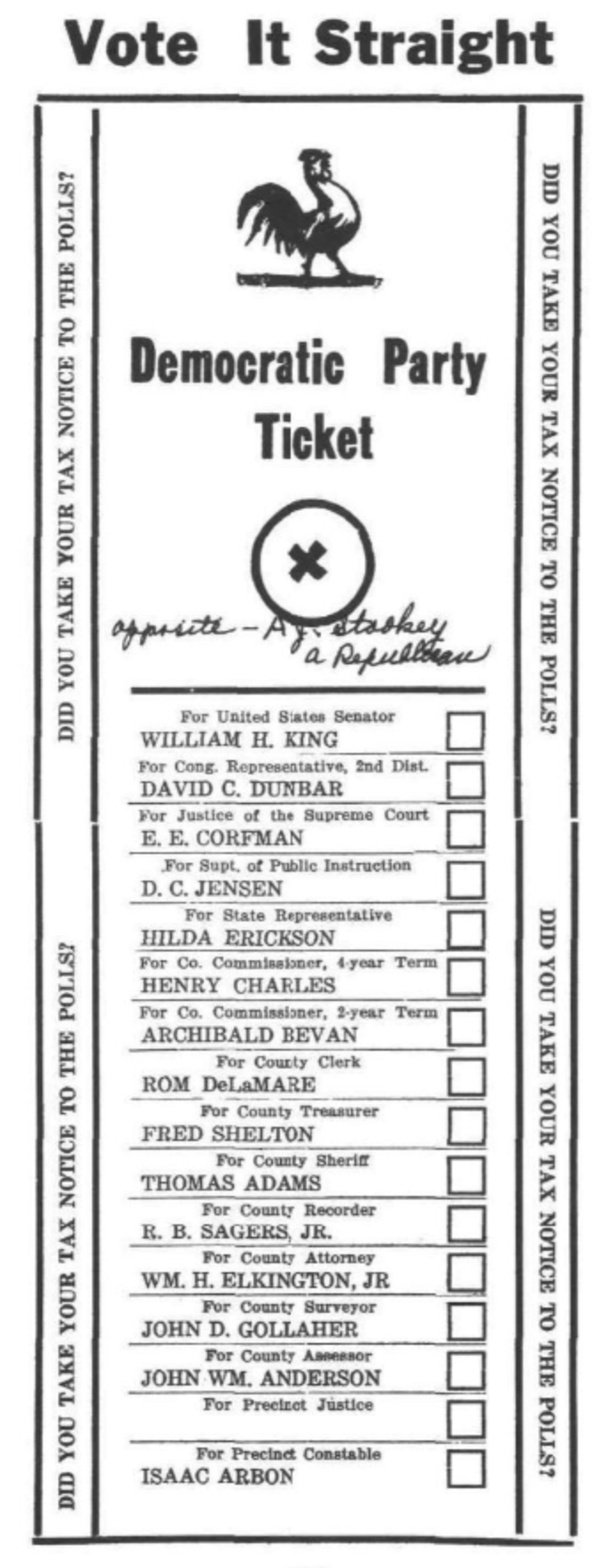
1922 Democratic Party Ticket for State Legislature

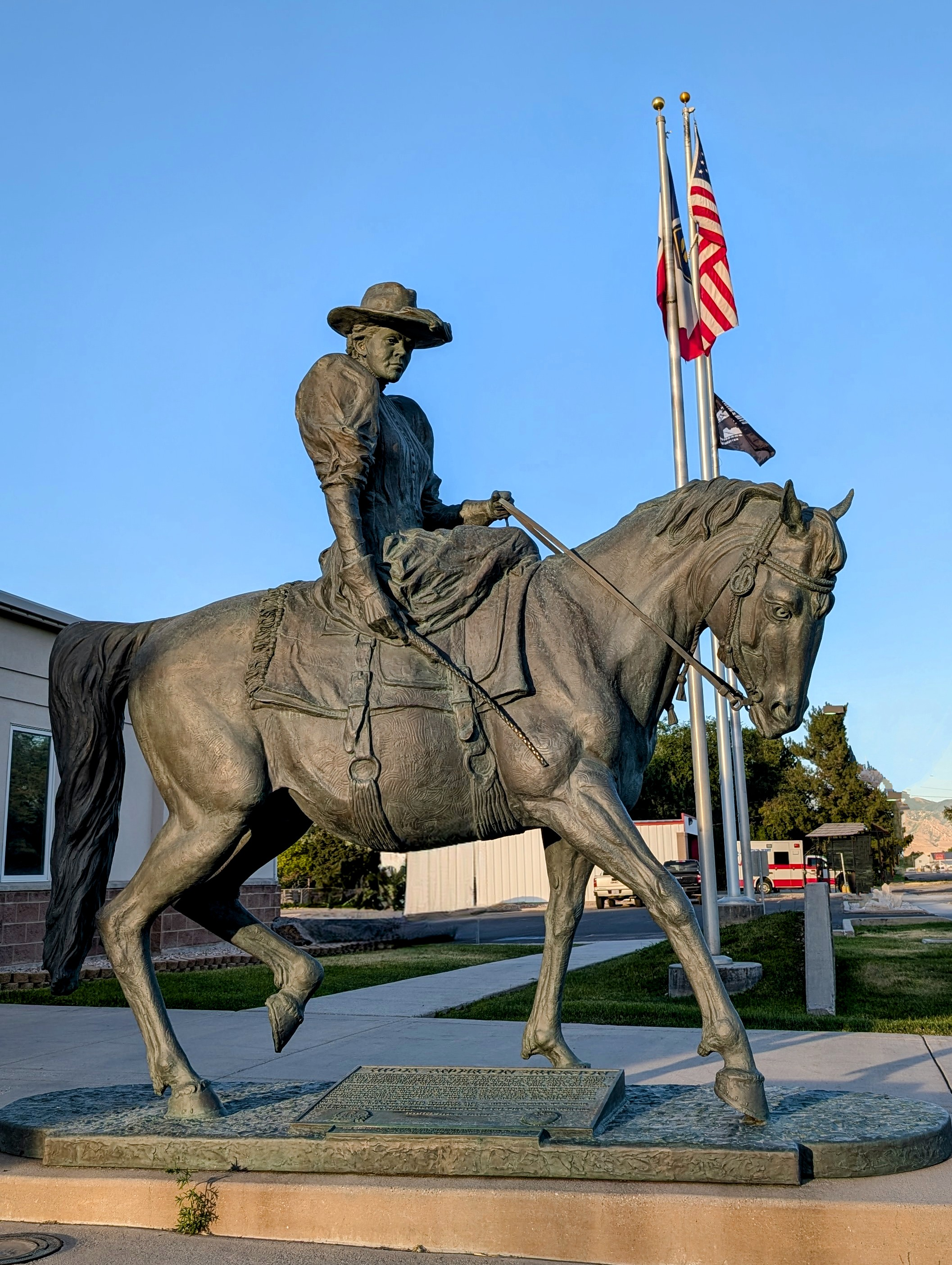
Hilda Anderson Erickson statue, Grantsville, UT

== Notable Achievements ==
Erickson served as one of the directors of the Grantsville Deseret Bank from its opening in 1910 until its closing in 1931.

Erickson served as a dentist for her community and always carried forceps in case of emergency. Sometimes children came into her general store in Ibapah with a toothache; she would extract the tooth in the back room and then send the child home with a bag of candy.

She was a lifelong member of the Daughters of the Utah Pioneers.

In 1922, Erickson ran for state legislature as the Democratic nominee.

During the Great Depression Erickson served as secretary of the federal Farm Loan Association in Grantsville.

== See also ==
- Hilda Erickson House
