= William Jefferies Jr. =

English Mormon pioneer

William Jefferies Jr. (March 8, 1831 – November 15, 1913) was an English Mormon pioneer and early settler of the American frontier.

== Biography ==
William Jefferies Jr. was born in Syston, Gloucestershire Somersetshire on March 8, 1831. He was educated privately in England, joined the Church of Jesus Christ of Latter-day Saints (LDS Church) there in 1856, served for a time as a missionary, and emigrated to Utah Territory in 1856, crossing the plains in Joseph W. Young's pioneer company. Jefferies located in Grantsville, Utah, as tithing clerk upon arriving in Utah, and later was involved in other endeavors there. Jefferies was one of the leading men in Grantsville in the latter half of the 19th-century, involved in almost all business ventures in that city and served as one of its earliest mayors.

He married Mary F. Ould on April 3, 1861, and they had twelve children.

He died at his home in Grantsville on November 15, 1913.
