= Peter Clegg House =

- U.S. National Register of Historic Places
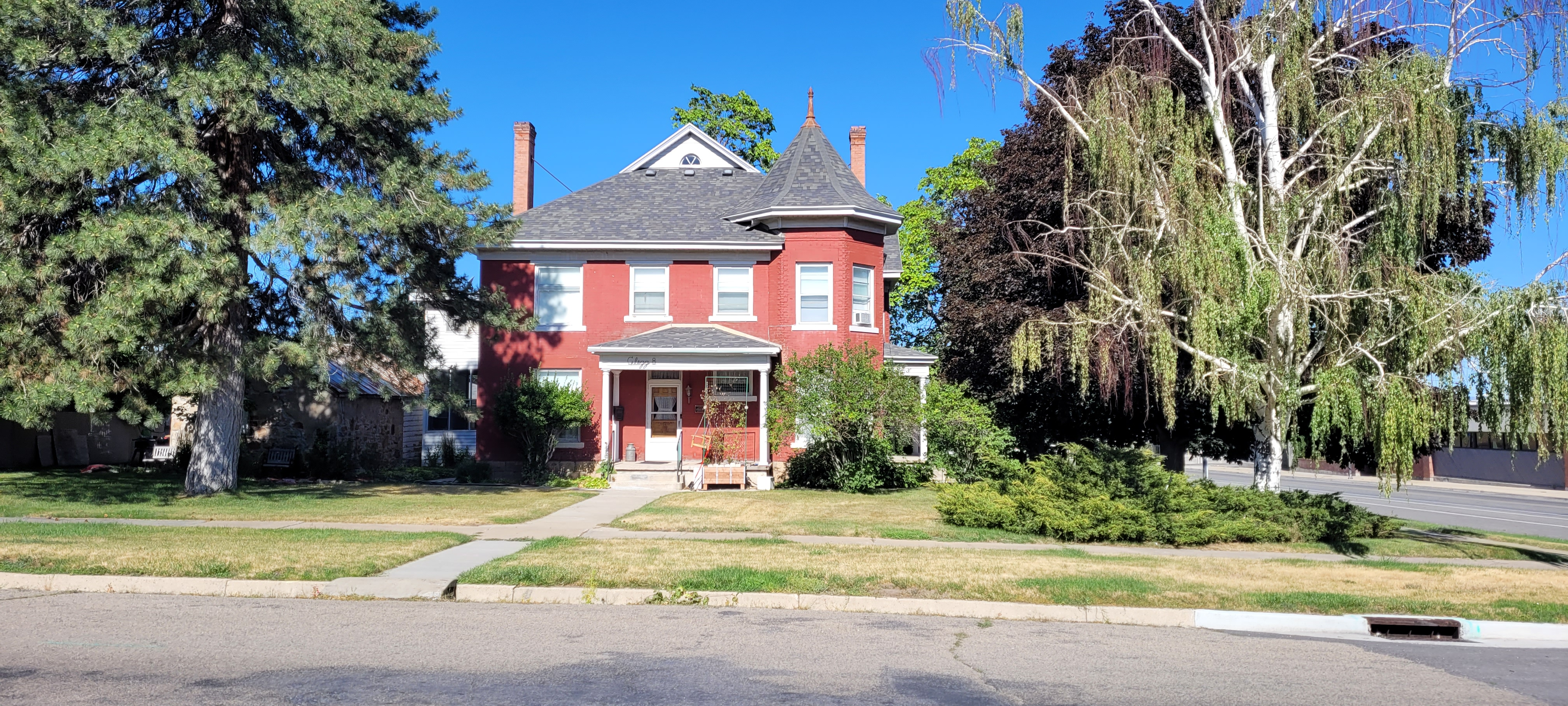

- Location within Utah Location within the United States
- Location: 8 South 100 East, Tooele, Utah
- Coordinates: 40°31′49″N 112°17′45″W
- Area: .36 acres (0.15 ha)
- Built: 1903
- NRHP reference No.: 100004483
- Added to NRHP: September 30, 2019

The Peter Clegg House, at 8 South 100 East in Tooele, Utah, was built in 1903. It was listed on the National Register of Historic Places in 2019.

It is a two-story "Central-Block-with-Projecting-Bays"-type single family house, with Victorian Eclectic style.

It was deemed significant in part for its association with the life of Peter Clegg.
