= Kirk Hotel (Tooele, Utah) =

- U.S. National Register of Historic Places
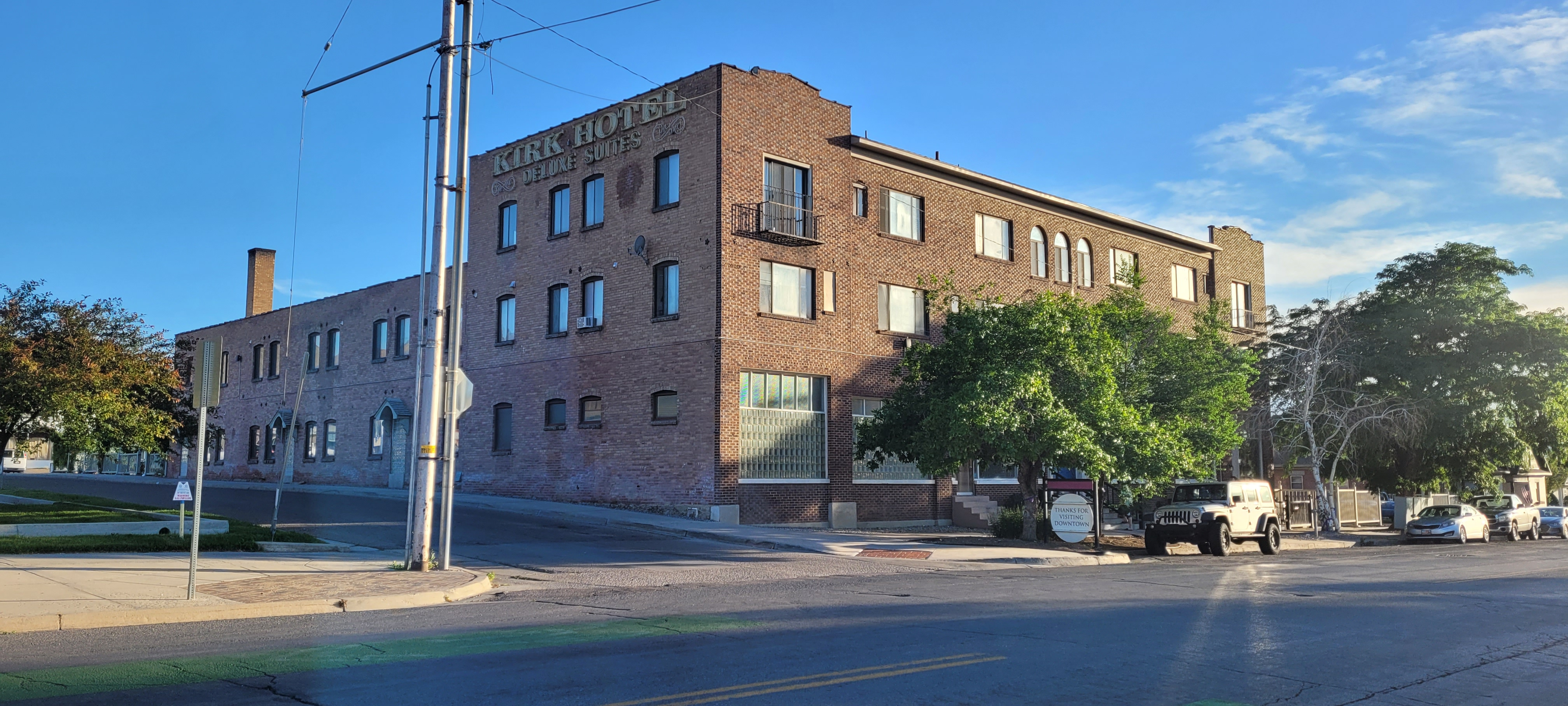

- Location within Utah Location within the United States
- Location: 57 West Vine St., Tooele, Utah
- Coordinates: 40.53044°N 112.30029°W
- Area: less than one acre
- Built: 1927-28
- NRHP reference No.: 100004880
- Added to NRHP: January 21, 2020

The Kirk Hotel, in Tooele, Utah, was listed on the National Register of Historic Places in 2020.

It was built during 1927-28 and converted into apartments in 1973.

It was listed as "one of Tooele’s most important historic buildings" built to provide lodging related for a significant local industry, mining and smelting. The structure "was important to small-town life"
