= John C. Sharp House =

Historic house in Utah, United States

- U.S. National Register of Historic Places
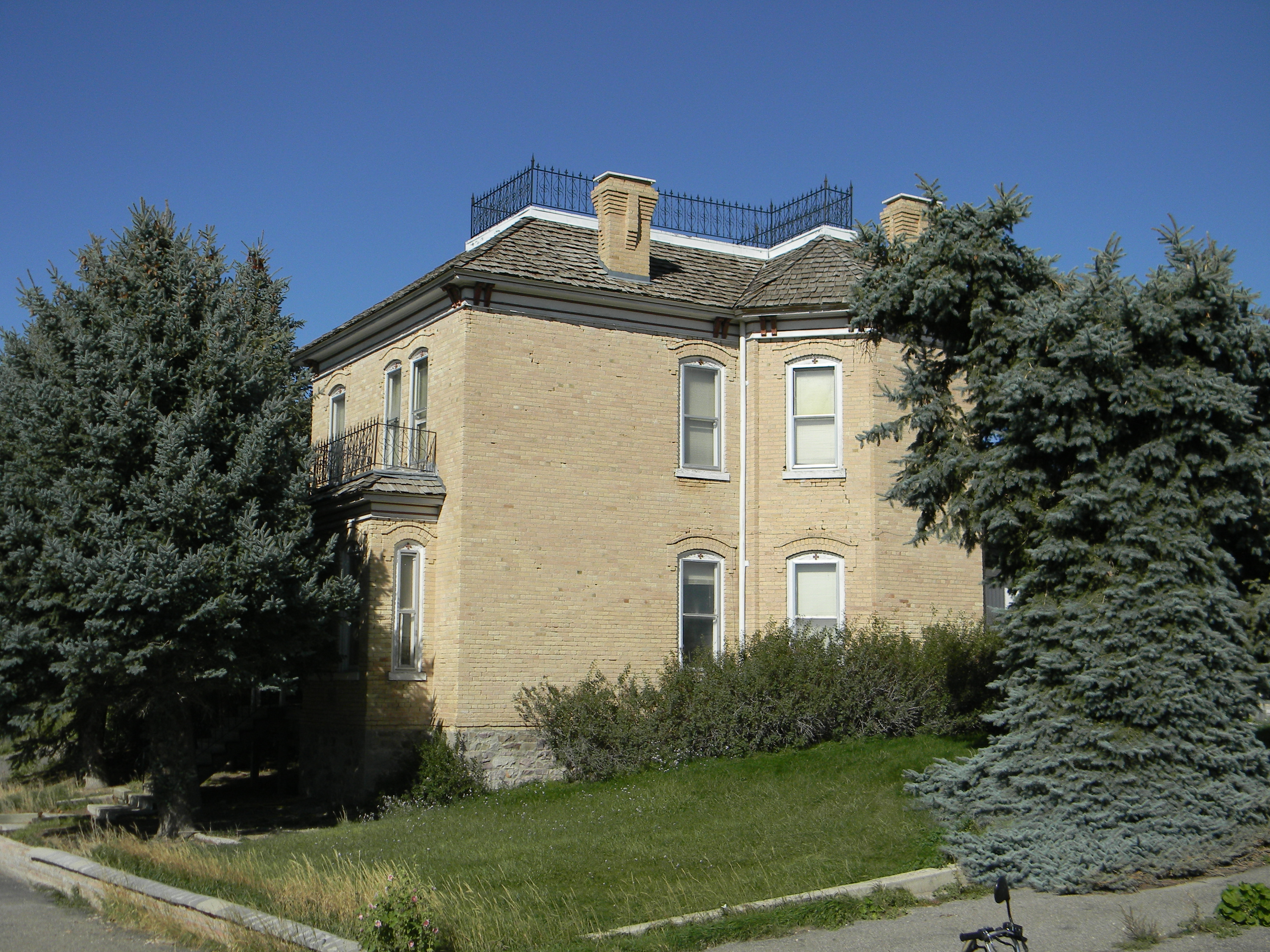

- Location within Utah Location within the United States
- Location: Off UT 36, Vernon, Utah
- Coordinates: 40°5′16″N 112°26′3″W
- Area: 3 acres (1.2 ha)
- Built: 1888
- Architectural style: Italianate
- NRHP reference No.: 84002424
- Added to NRHP: July 13, 1984

The John C. Sharp House, located off Utah 36 in Vernon, Utah, is an Italianate house that was built in 1888.

It is significant for association with John C. Sharp, bishop of the Vernon Ward of the Church of Jesus Christ of Latter-day Saints (LDS Church), and also for being the only surviving house "which represents the financial success of many of the early ranchers and farmers, most of whom left the area as soon as they could afford to." Further it is one of relatively few surviving houses of a certain type: Italianate box with a side passage plan; it is one of just 11 known in the state, nine being in Salt Lake City.

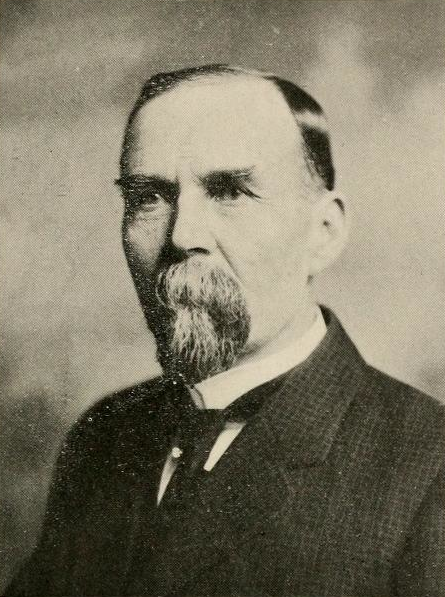
John C. Sharp, original owner of the house

Others that are NRHP-listed include the Charles R. Savage House in Salt Lake City, the Howe C. Wallace House (a contributing property in the Avenues Historic District) in Salt Lake City; the Lewis S. Hills House in Salt Lake City, and the David McDonald House in Salt Lake City.

It was listed on the National Register of Historic Places in 1984. The listing included three contributing buildings: the house, a c.1888 barn, and a c.1888 milk house.
