= Bill Wrathall =

New Zealand cartoonist (1931–1995)

William George Picton Wrathall (1931 – 1995) was born in Auckland. He was a cartoonist for the New Zealand Truth newspaper from 1976 to 1991. His work also appeared in the Weekly News, New Zealand Listener, and the Sunday Times. In addition to editorial cartoons, he created several comic strips, including Godzone for the New Zealand Listener and Pioneer Go Home for Truth (from 1974). He was the nephew of renowned New Zealand commercial artist and cartoonist Stopford George (Stop) Wrathall, who influenced his style.

== Publications ==
- Pioneer Go Home! (1976). Wellington, INL Print.
- Korero Māori. Series A (1973). Auckland, Heinemann Educational Books (as illustrator).
- Korero Māori. Series B (1974). Auckland, Heinemann Educational Books (as illustrator).

== Exhibitions ==
- Theatre 87 (5-9 July 1976)
- A bit of cheek: the many faces of Muldoon (National Library of New Zealand, 1994)
