= James and Penninah Wrathall House =

Historic house in Utah, United States

- U.S. National Register of Historic Places
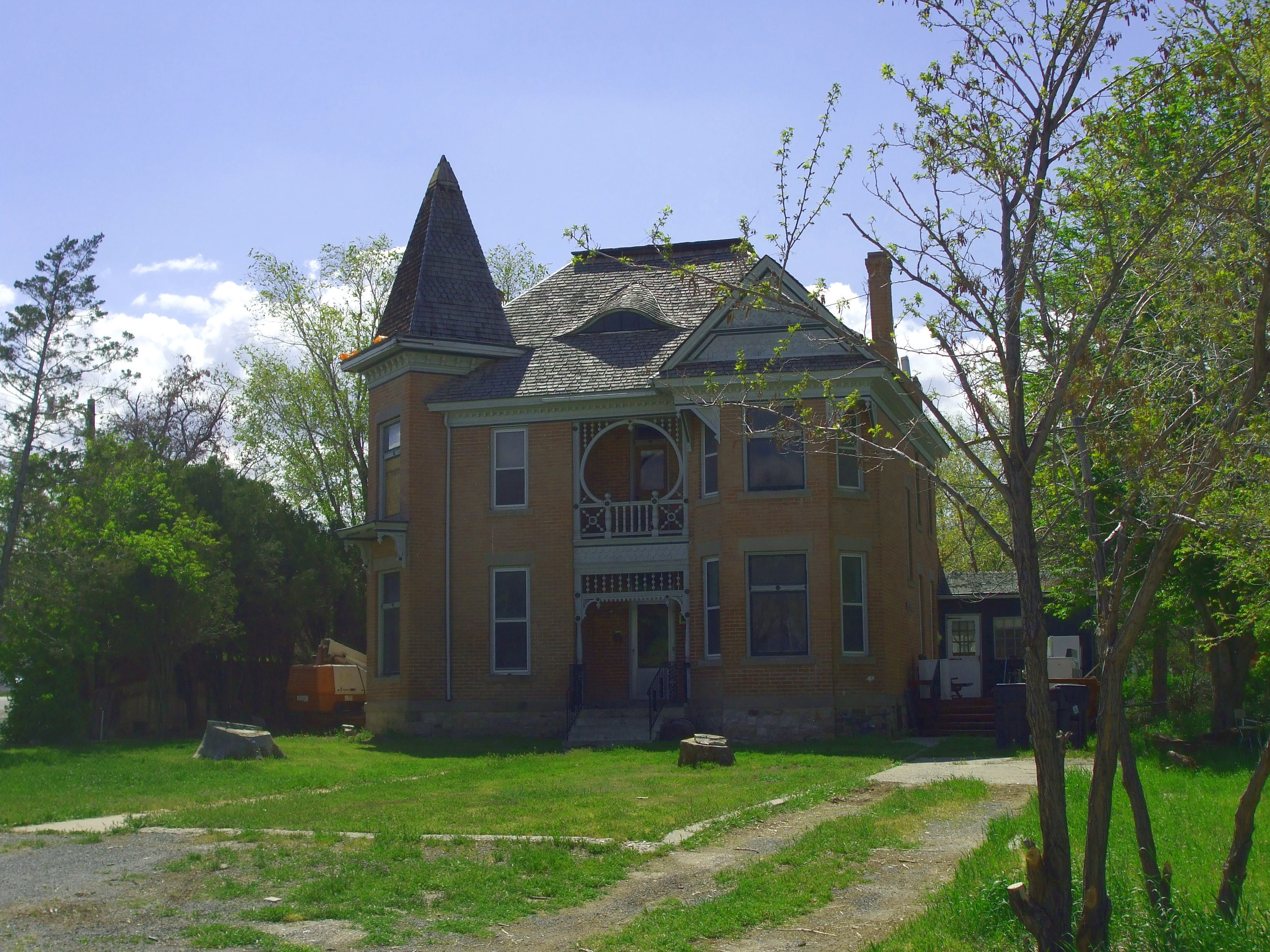
- House in 2010

- Location within Utah Location within the United States
- Location: 5 N. Center St., Grantsville, Utah
- Coordinates: 40°36′1″N 112°28′10″W
- Area: less than one acre
- Built: 1898
- Built by: Schaffer, Charles Z.
- Architectural style: Queen Anne, Stick/Eastlake
- MPS: Grantsville, Utah MPS
- NRHP reference No.: 05001629
- Added to NRHP: February 3, 2006

The James and Penninah Wrathall House, located at 5 N. Center St. in Grantsville, Utah, was built in 1898. It was listed on the National Register of Historic Places in 2006.

Its NRHP nomination describes it as an "imposing" residence that is significant as "an unusual and well-preserved example of the Victorian style known as Queen Anne. The design shows the influence of design books, particularly in the Queen Anne and Eastlake details, but the execution by local builder, Charles Z. Schaffer, is unique."
