= Stockton School =

- U.S. National Register of Historic Places
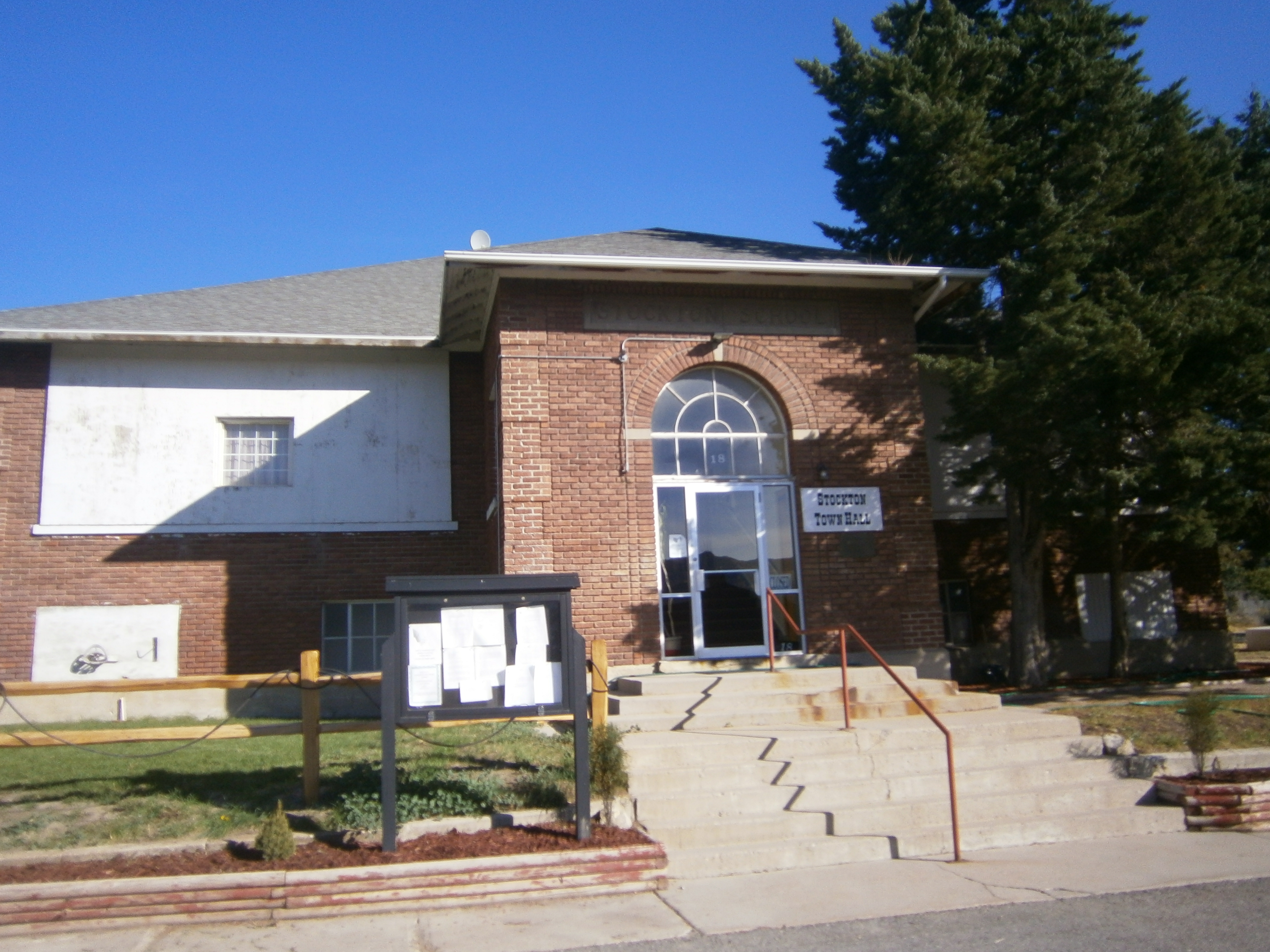

- Location within Utah Location within the United States
- Location: 18 N. Johnson St., Stockton, Utah
- Coordinates: 40.451528°N 112.36°W
- Area: less than one acre
- Built: 1912
- NRHP reference No.: 100003269
- Added to NRHP: December 31, 2018

The Stockton School is a historic building in Stockton, Utah, United States. It was built in 1912. In 2019, it currently houses the Stockton Town Hall.

It was listed on the National Register of Historic Places in 2018.
