= David E. Davis House =

Historic house in Utah, United States

- U.S. National Register of Historic Places
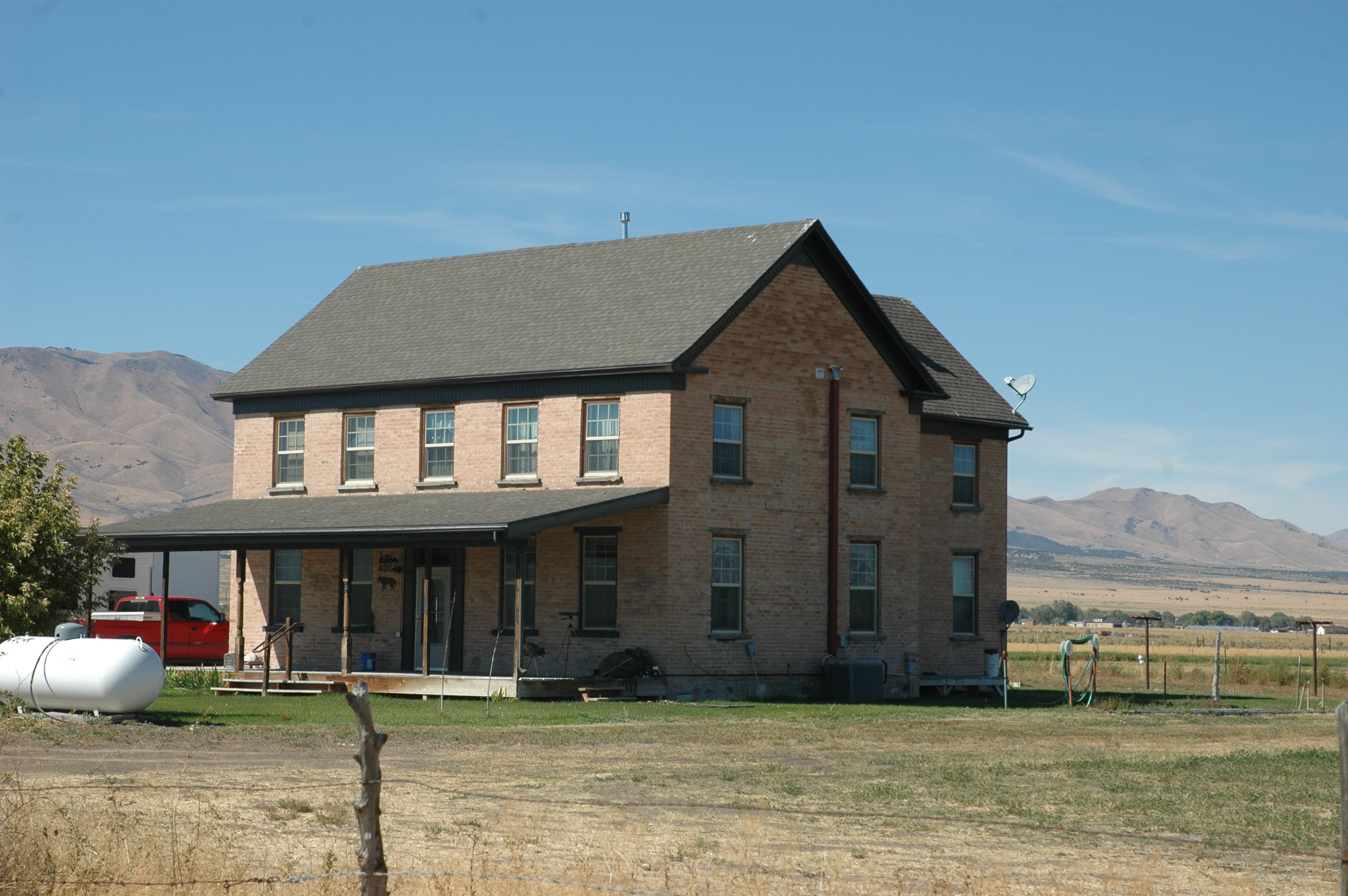

- Location within Utah Location within the United States
- Location: 400 E. UT 199, Rush Valley, Utah
- Coordinates: 40°20′14″N 112°26′10″W
- Built: c.1884
- NRHP reference No.: 07001172
- Added to NRHP: November 8, 2007

The David E. Davis House, located at 400 E. UT 199 in Rush Valley, Utah, was listed on the National Register of Historic Places in 2007. Though it was eligible for listing in 1984, the then-current owner objected. Subsequent changes to the house, however, did not ruin the historic integrity of the house, so in 2007, under a later owner, it was possible to list the property.

The house was built between 1883 and 1885 for David E. Davis. The brick house was one of the earliest of its kind in the Rush Valley area. Davis, a polygamist, built the house for his three wives and their families.

In the updated documentation for the NRHP listing, it was noted that a new owner discovered what was probably a "polygamy pit": a hidden room where polygamist David E. Davis might have hidden from U.S. marshals seeking his arrest. The room, which could also have been a root cellar, is the size of a small bedroom and is hidden below the rear room of the house, with access by a ladder. Since the apparent finishing of the room was more refined than needed for a root cellar, it is believed this was meant for, and may well have been used as, a hiding place.
