= Frisco Charcoal Kilns =

- U.S. National Register of Historic Places
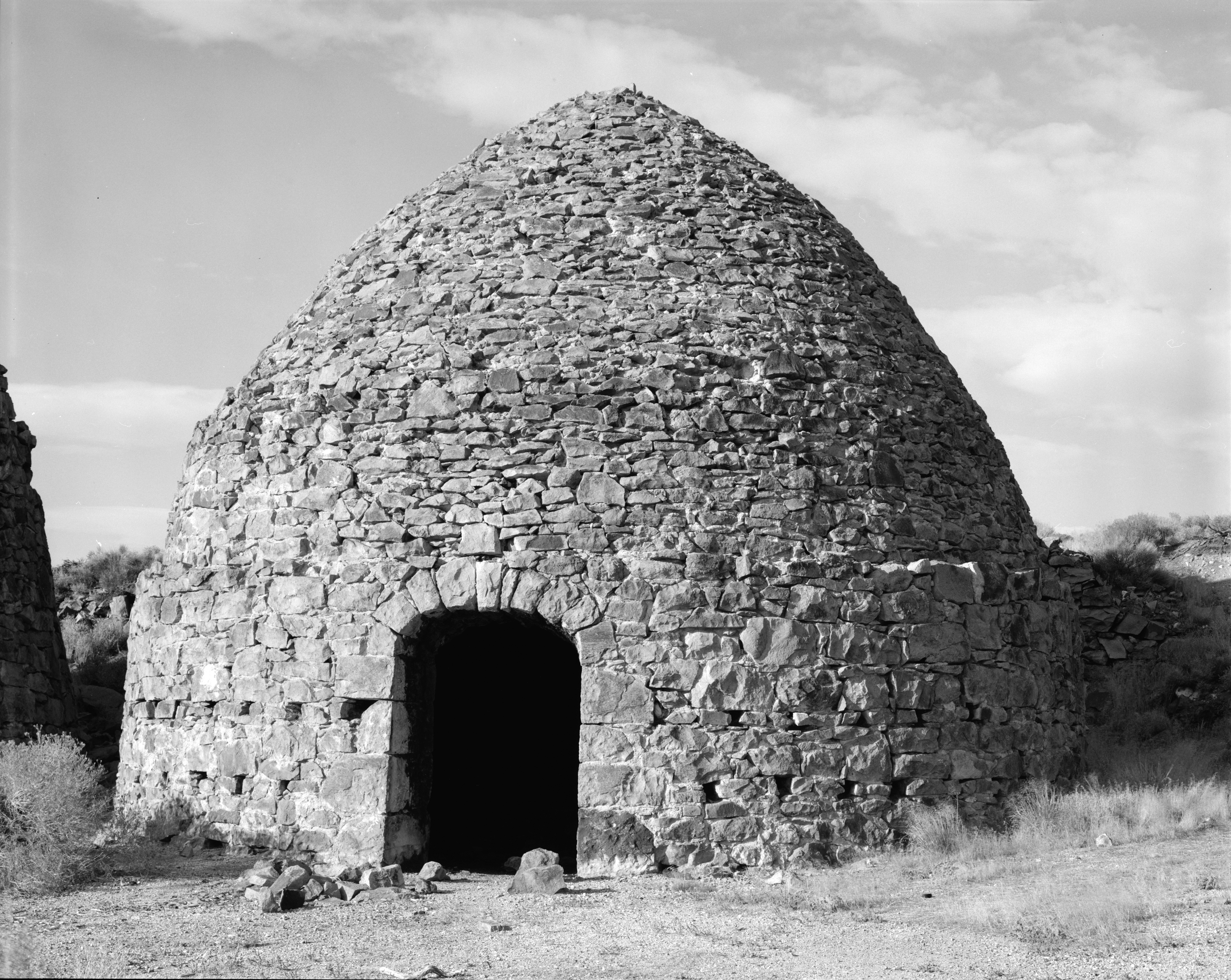
- Frisco Charcoal Kilns, Kiln No. 2

- Location within Utah Location within the United States
- Location: Utah State Route 21, west of Milford, Utah
- Coordinates: 38°27′39″N 113°15′46″W
- Built: 1877–1880
- NRHP reference No.: 82004793
- Added to NRHP: March 9, 1982

The Frisco Charcoal Kilns are remnants of silver mining in the Utah ghost town of Frisco. They remain as a visual documentation of the state's mining history

== Background ==
San Francisco Mining District was created on August 12, 1871, in the Utah Territory's San Francisco mountain range in Beaver County. At that time, galena was the primary ore being mined in the area. The Horn Silver Mine was established in 1875, and was the beginning of the silver mining in the range. The town of Frisco grew up around that mine, and was the nexus of the mining district. On February 12, 1885, the Horn Silver Mine had a massive cave-in. While there were no fatalities and the mine continued to produce for years, workers began to leave for other mining areas.

== Kilns ==
Smelting is the process of extracting metal from ore. Charcoal-fueled smelting in both pits and kilns had been used in Utah since at least 1872. Overall, there were 36 beehive-shaped smelting kilns operating in the district. The five granite beehive-shaped charcoal smelting kilns that have survived in Frisco were created by the Frisco Mining and Smelting Company under the supervision of Benjamin Y. Hampton, primarily for the Horn Silver Mine, between 1877 and 1880 for $500-$1000 apiece. Each kiln varies in size from the other, anywhere from 16 to 32 feet in diameter. The company was hard-hit by the Horn Silver Mine cave-in, and eventually closed up shop in 1884. The surviving kilns were added to the National Register of Historic Places March 9, 1982 as an integral part of Utah's history.
