= Ophir, Utah =

- CDP
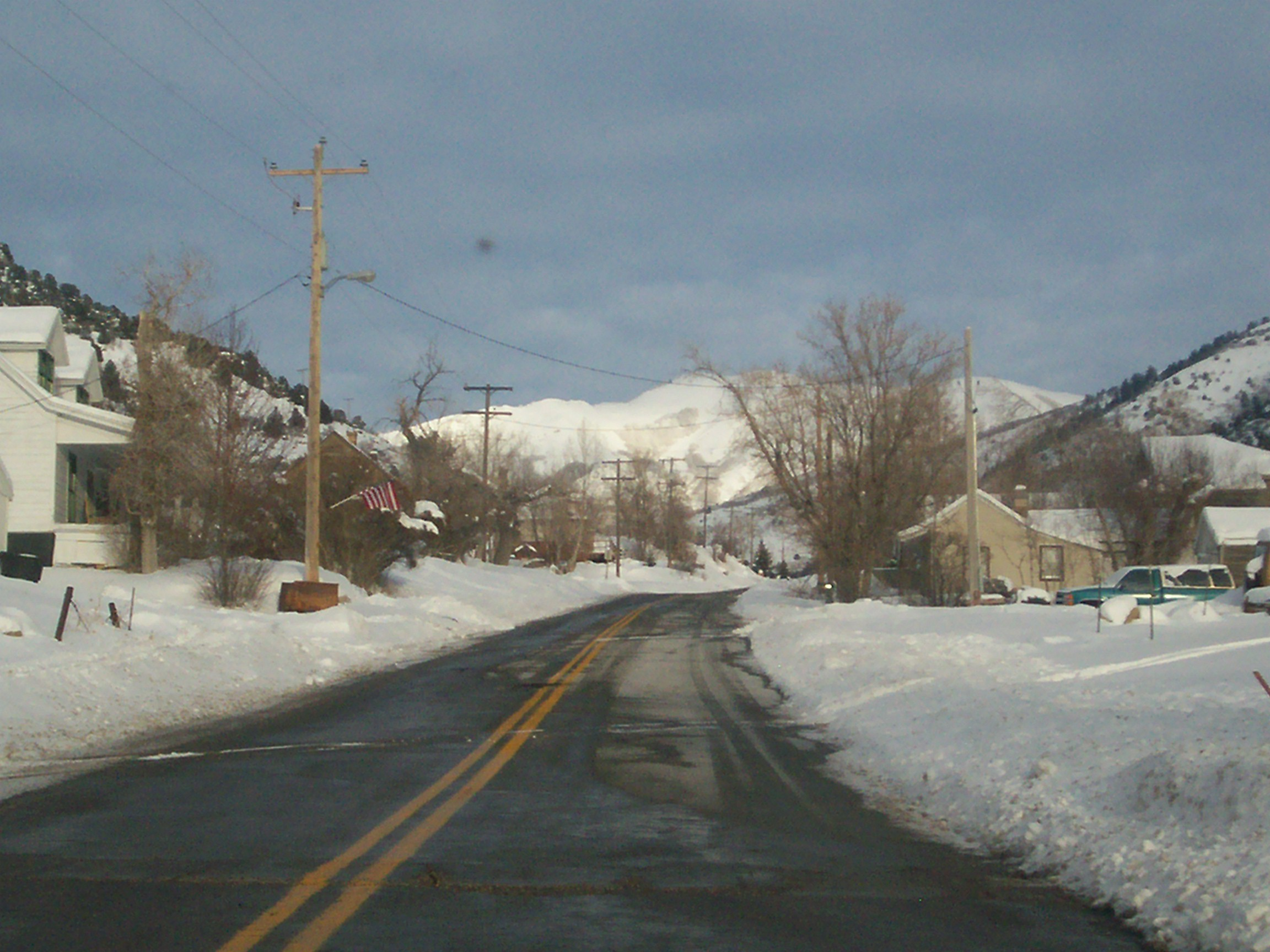
- Ophir in winter, December 2007

- Location in Tooele County and the State of Utah

- Location of Utah in the United States
- Coordinates: 40°22′20″N 112°14′50″W
- Country: United States
- State: Utah
- County: Tooele
- Named for: Ophir

Area
  - Total: 0.15 sq mi (0.4 km^{2})
  - Land: 0.15 sq mi (0.4 km^{2})
  - Water: 0 sq mi (0.0 km^{2})
- Elevation: 6,582 ft (2,006 m)

Population (2020)
  - Total: 24
  - Density: 160/sq mi (60/km^{2})
- Time zone: UTC-7 (Mountain (MST))
  - Summer (DST): UTC-6 (MDT)
- ZIP code: 84071
- Area code: 435
- FIPS code: 49-56750
- GNIS feature ID: 2787910

Ophir is a census-designated place in Tooele County, Utah, United States. It is part of the Salt Lake City, Utah Metropolitan Statistical Area. The population was 24 at the 2020 census, a decrease of 14 from the 2010 figure of 38.

== History ==
Ophir was named for the nearby canyon and mining district, where gold, silver-lead deposits were found in the 1860s. The mining district was named for the biblical Ophir, from where King Solomon brought back gold to Israel. In 1911, zinc was recovered and various mining operations continued until 1959.

Prior to 2016, Ophir was one of the smallest incorporated municipalities in Utah. However, after a town government could not be formed from the remaining citizens in 2016, the town was disincorporated.

== Geography ==
According to the United States Census Bureau, the town has a total area of 0.2 square mile (0.4 km^{2}), all land.

== Demographics ==
Historical population
Census	Pop.	Note	%±
1890	249		—
1900	295		18.5%
1910	283		−4.1%
1920	522		84.5%
1930	170		−67.4%
1940	300		76.5%
1950	199		−33.7%
1960	36		−81.9%
1970	76		111.1%
1980	42		−44.7%
1990	25		−40.5%
2000	23		−8.0%
2010	38		65.2%
2020	24		−36.8%
U.S. Decennial Census

At the 2000 census there were 23 people, 10 households, and 6 families in the town. The population density was 143.0 people per square mile (55.5/km^{2}). There were 33 housing units at an average density of 205.1 per square mile (79.6/km^{2}). The racial makeup of the town was 95.65% White and 4.35% Asian. Of the 10 households 20.0% had children under the age of 18 living with them, 60.0% were married couples living together, and 40.0% were non-families. 40.0% of households were one person and 20.0% were one person aged 65 or older. The average household size was 2.30 and the average family size was 3.17.

The age distribution was 8.7% under the age of 18, 8.7% from 18 to 24, 8.7% from 25 to 44, 43.5% from 45 to 64, and 30.4% 65 or older. The median age was 54 years. For every 100 females, there were 109.1 males. For every 100 females age 18 and over, there were 110.0 males.

The median household income was $50,000 and the median family income was $49,167. Males had a median income of $46,875 versus $13,750 for females. The per capita income for the town was $29,906. None of the population or families were below the poverty line.

== See also ==
- List of cities and towns in Utah
