= Grantsville, Utah =

City in Utah, United States

- City
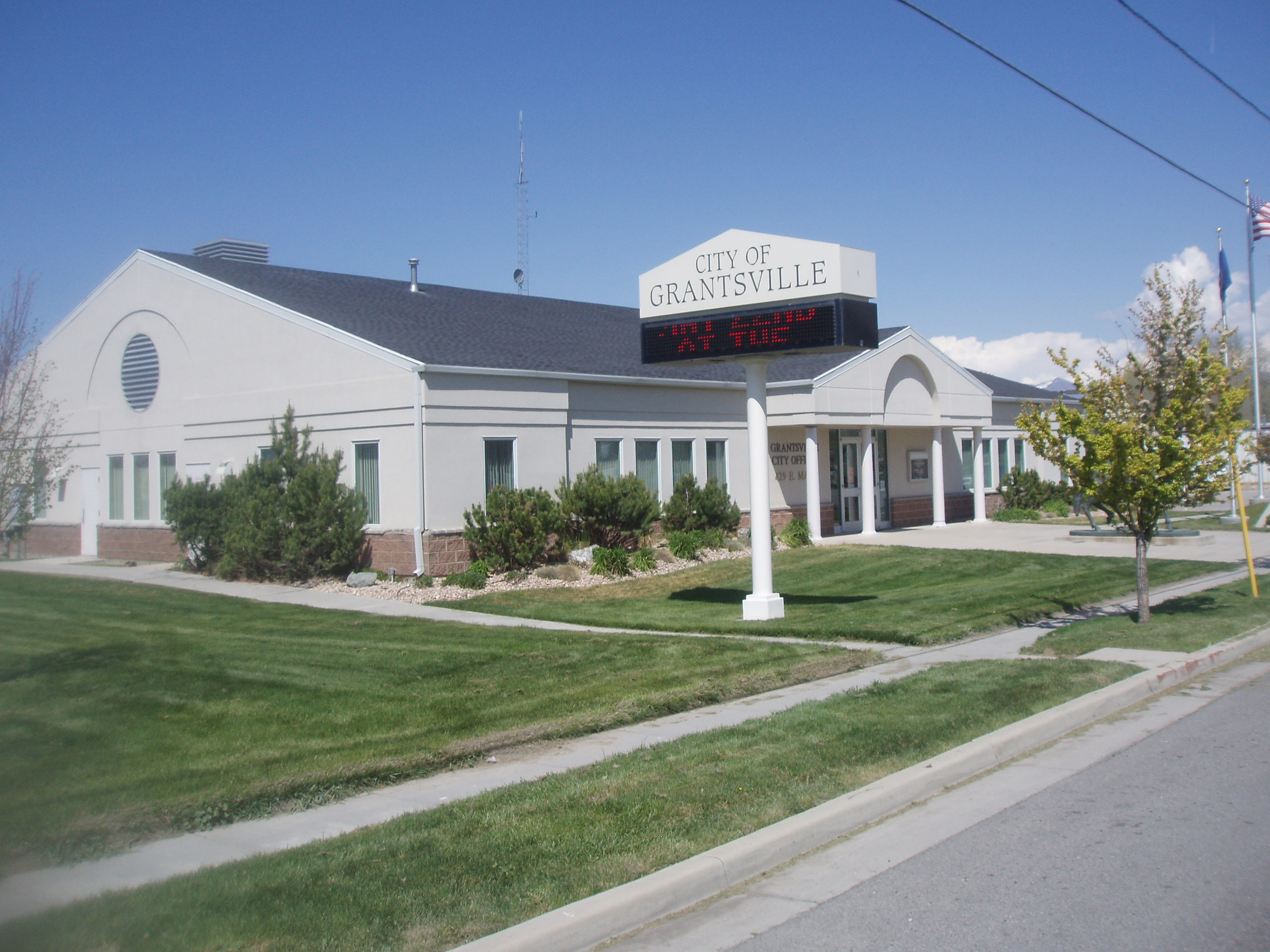
- Grantsville City Office
- Interactive map of Grantsville, Utah
- Location within Utah Location within the United States
- Coordinates: 40°36′30″N 112°28′15″W
- Country: United States
- State: Utah
- County: Tooele County
- District: UT-2
- Settled: 1850
- Incorporated: January 12, 1867
- Named for: Ulysses S. Grant

Area
  - Total: 37.59 sq mi (97.36 km^{2})
  - Land: 37.47 sq mi (97.05 km^{2})
  - Water: 0.12 sq mi (0.30 km^{2})
- Elevation: 4,265 ft (1,300 m)

Population (2020)
  - Total: 12,617
  - Density: 336.7/sq mi (130.0/km^{2})
- Time zone: UTC-7 (Mountain (MST))
  - Summer (DST): UTC-6 (MDT)
- ZIP code: 84029
- Area code: 435
- FIPS code: 49-31120
- GNIS feature ID: 2410648
- Website: Official website

Grantsville is the second most populous city in Tooele County, Utah, United States. It is part of the Salt Lake City metropolitan area. The population was 12,627 at the 2020 census. The city has grown slowly and steadily throughout most of its existence, but rapid increases in growth occurred during the 1970s, 1990s, and 2010s. Recent rapid growth has been attributed to being close to Salt Lake City, small town community feel, lower housing costs than Salt Lake County, the nearby Deseret Peak recreational center, the Utah Motorsports Campus raceway, and the newly built Wal-Mart distribution center located just outside the city. It is quickly becoming a bedroom community for commuters into the Salt Lake Valley.

== History ==
The area of Grantsville was originally populated by the Goshute tribe.

Grantsville was originally called "Willow Creek", and has also been called "Twenty Wells" due to the natural wells that give fresh water to the area. Grantsville was settled by Mormon pioneers in 1850, with the arrival of the brothers-in-law James McBride and Harrison Severe, with their wives and families. The present name, after Col. George D. Grant, a leader in the Church of Jesus Christ of Latter-day Saints, was adopted c. 1853. A post office called Grantsville has been in operation since 1864.

== Geography ==
Grantsville is bordered on the south by South Mountain, which separates Rush Valley from Tooele Valley. To the north is Stansbury Island, and on the east are the Oquirrh Mountains and the Great Salt Lake, and on the west side the Stansbury Mountains. SR-138 passes through the city, heading northwest to intersect with I-80 and east to Stansbury Park.

The climate is hot during the summer and cold and snowy during the winter. Although Grantsville can be affected by lake-effect snow from the Great Salt Lake, most of the time, it is too far southwest.

According to the United States Census Bureau, the city has a total area of 19.34 square miles (50.1 km^{2}), of which 19.2 square miles (50 km^{2}) is land and 0.04 square miles (0.10 km^{2}) (0.22%) is water.

== Demographics ==
Historical population
Census	Pop.	Note	%±
1860	451		—
1870	755		67.4%
1880	1,007		33.4%
1890	979		−2.8%
1900	1,058		8.1%
1910	1,154		9.1%
1920	1,213		5.1%
1930	1,201		−1.0%
1940	1,242		3.4%
1950	1,537		23.8%
1960	2,166		40.9%
1970	2,931		35.3%
1980	4,419		50.8%
1990	4,500		1.8%
2000	6,015		33.7%
2010	8,893		47.8%
2020	12,617		41.9%
Source: U.S. Census Bureau

=== 2020 census ===
As of the 2020 census, Grantsville had a population of 12,617, a population density of 335.65 people per square mile (129.59/km^{2}), a median age of 31.7 years, and 33.3% of residents under the age of 18 while 10.1% were 65 years of age or older. For every 100 females there were 102.1 males, and for every 100 females age 18 and over there were 98.6 males age 18 and over.

There were 3,734 households in Grantsville, of which 49.1% had children under the age of 18 living in them. Of all households, 68.0% were married-couple households, 12.4% were households with a male householder and no spouse or partner present, and 14.4% were households with a female householder and no spouse or partner present. About 14.2% of all households were made up of individuals and 6.6% had someone living alone who was 65 years of age or older.

There were 3,855 housing units, of which 3.1% were vacant. The homeowner vacancy rate was 0.8% and the rental vacancy rate was 5.8%.

76.1% of residents lived in urban areas, while 23.9% lived in rural areas.

Racial composition as of the 2020 census
Race	Number	Percent
White	11,501	91.2%
Black or African American	31	0.2%
American Indian and Alaska Native	73	0.6%
Asian	35	0.3%
Native Hawaiian and Other Pacific Islander	22	0.2%
Some other race	267	2.1%
Two or more races	688	5.5%
Hispanic or Latino (of any race)	919	7.3%

=== Other statistics ===
The median income for a household in the city was $84,293. 5.0% of the population were below the poverty line.

24.9% of the population has a Bachelor's Degree or higher. The School Enrolled Population Enrolled in Kindergarten to 12th Grade is 79.0%.

Employment: 72.8% of employees are private company workers, 16.8% government workers, 5.9% private not-for-profit workers, 3.4% self-employed in not owned business, and 1.1% self-employed in own business.

== Education ==
Grantsville is in the Tooele County School District and has three elementary schools (Grantsville, Twenty Wells, and Willow), Grantsville Junior High School, and Grantsville High School. There are also a few preschools.

Due to a fire on July 13, 2009, Grantsville Elementary School was forced to close until a new elementary school was built. The new school opened for the 2011–2012 school year.

== Events ==
The Old Folks Sociable is the traditional social event of the year. The Old Folks Sociable idea started in 1875 when professional photographer Charles Savage and LDS Church Presiding Bishop Edward Hunter inaugurated "Old Folks Day" to honor fathers and mothers. The first Old Folks Sociable held in Grantsville was on January 6, 1884. This annual event is believed to have been canceled only twice in its 125-year history.

The Old Folks Sociable honors all residents and former residents who are 75 years older. Grantsville High School, home to the Old Folks Sociable, becomes a gathering place for high school class reunions and family reunions. The Sociable is also a celebration of Grantsville's heritage. For residents and former residents, it is a walk down memory lane. Events include a 5K run, a car show, a program, a reception for honored guests, a dinner, and a dance. All residents and former (eighteen years and older) are invited to attend. The Old Folks Sociable is held each year during the month of March.

== Notable people ==
- Parley P. Christensen, American attorney and politician
- Joshua Reuben Clark Jr., former U.S. ambassador to Mexico
- William Jefferies Jr., English Mormon pioneer and early settler of the American frontier
- Jack Johnson (tackle), professional American football player
- Merrill Nelson, American politician
- Lula Greene Richards, a poet and the first female periodical editor in Utah Territory
- Marianne C. Sharp, first counselor in the general presidency of the Relief Society of the Church of Jesus Christ of Latter-day Saints from 1945-1974
