= List of killings by law enforcement officers in the United States, October 2026 =

This is a list of people reported killed by non-military law enforcement officers in the United States in October 2026, whether in the line of duty or not, and regardless of reason or method. The listing documents the occurrence of a death, making no implications regarding wrongdoing or justification on the part of the person killed or officer involved. Killings are arranged by date of the incident that caused death. Different death dates, if known, are noted in the description. The table below lists 105 people.

== October 2026 ==
Date	Name (age) of deceased	Race	Location	Description
2026-10-31	Troy Brown (60)	Unknown	Healdton, Oklahoma	Carter County deputies responded to an apartment complex following a domestic dispute. A man was found stabbed and was transported to a hospital. When deputies located Brown, the suspect, brandished a knife before being shot.
2026-10-31	Fatima Scarlet Morales (23)	Hispanic	Bakersfield, California	A patrol vehicle which was responding to a call struck a pedestrian who was not using a crosswalk, who was pronounced dead at the scene.
2026-10-31	Kristine Poulos (32)	White	Los Angeles, California	A pedestrian was struck and killed by an LAPD cruiser when officers were responding to a call with lights and sirens on in Van Nuys.
2026-10-30	John Tyler Bishop (31)	White	Tellico Plains, Tennessee	While attempting to serve a warrant on Bishop at a home, Monroe County deputies engaged in a foot pursuit when he fled the scene. To take him into custody, deputies deployed a taser and applied physical force. Bishop subsequently lost responsiveness and died on November 3.
2026-10-30	Gilberto Ontiveros Reyes (34)	HIspanic	Hawthorne, California	Police responded after reports about a man armed with a gun at The Coach's Sports Bar & Grill. During the encounter, officers shot the man.
2026-10-30	unidentified male	Unknown	Boston, Massachusetts	Boston Police responded to a residence in the Brighton neighborhood for a mental health incident involving a suicidal subject. The subject charged at officers with a knife before he was shot.
2026-10-30	Neil W. Jones (44)	White	Fairview Heights, Illinois	Police received a report about a man on drugs and driving through the caller's yard in early morning. When officers arrived, the man charged at officers with a knife before being shot.
2026-10-29	Rakeem Deandre James (33)	Black	Atlanta, Georgia	Atlanta Police attempted to serve a warrant and conducted a stop on a vehicle driven by James in the Bankhead neighborhood. James, of Lithonia, drove away before backing his vehicle into a cruiser and repeatedly hitting the police SUV positioned in front of his vehicle. Multiple officers shot him in response.
2026-10-29	unidentified male (30)	White	Rapid City, South Dakota	Police responded to a domestic violence incident at a home where a man threatened to shoot someone inside. Officers later found the suspect armed with the rifle. After police commands, the man aimed the rifle at officers when officers shot him dead.
2026-10-29	Rodrigo Gonzalez (33)	Hispanic	Anchorage, Alaska	Police located a burglary suspect and made contact with him from inside a Carrs Quality Centers store near Seward Highway. During the encounter, a struggle between the suspect and an officer occurred. The suspect fired a shot before a second officer discharged his gun, killing the suspect.
2026-10-29	Austin Howton (32)	White	Bridgeton, Missouri	St. Louis County Police officers responded to an Imo's Pizza where a suspect from Florissant held the employees at gunpoint. After a shootout, the suspect was shot and killed. Police said the suspect was a former employee at the Imo's location.
2026-10-28	Christopher Anderson (35)	White	Sherman, Texas	A caller told the police that Anderson tried to harm himself and another peson had taken his gun away from him. When officers arrived, they heard people screaming in the house and found two individuals and Anderson fighting to gain control of a gun. Police ordered Anderson to drop it but he ignored. Anderson eventually possessed the gun before police shot and killed him.
2026-10-28	Joshua Senfeld (30)	White	Boca Raton, Florida	A family member called the police about that Senfeld tried to take his own life. Palm Beach County Sheriff’s deputies found Senfeld at Sandalfoot Square at set up a perimeter, attempting to resolve the situation since Senfeld was armed. Senfield was seen intoxicated and suicidal during the negotiation and pointed a gun toward his head several times. At some point, he stood up and pointed the gun toward deputies' position. Deputies shot and killed him. The sheriff said Senfield suffered from PTSD as an army veteran.
2026-10-28	Roberto Castro-Quinonez (30)	Hispanic	Moonachie, New Jersey	New Jersey State Police detectives in plainclothes were conducting an investigation when one detective was approached by Castro-Quinonez. During the interaction, Castro-Quinonez pulled a knife on the detective before another trooper opened fire and killed him.
2026-10-28	Chadwick Clark (22)	Black	Dixmoor, Illinois	FBI and SWAT team were serving a federal warrant on Clark, a rapper, for reasons unknown. Clark was shot and killed in the incident under unknown circumstances. His family alleged that he was unarmed.
2026-10-27	unidentified male (50)	Unknown	Detroit, Michigan	Police responded to an assault at a BP gas station near the I-75/94 intersection in Poletown East after a man reportedly released a pit bull-type dog on a store manager and clerk during an altercation, leaving both injured. When officers tracked him to his home in the Bagley neighborhood, they heard a gun rack before they decided to establish a perimeter. Multiple agencies responded to the scene in order to de-escalate the situation. At some point, the man exited the house with multiple firearms. A firefight ensued which left him dead. According to police, the man may have been experiencing a mental health crisis.
2026-10-27	Katie Sue Ruth Huggins (22)	White	Ogden, Utah	A Box Elder County Sheriff was involved in a crash with a motorcyclist. Huggins, the motorcyclist, died in early November.
2026-10-27	unidentified male (17)	Unknown	Mesa, Arizona	A vehicle which fled a traffic stop was relocated by police. Officers also found a man armed with a gun running away from the car. During the foot chase, officers shot the man when the man pointed the gun at them.
2026-10-26	Oscar Corrales (27)	Hispanic	Chicago, Illinois	An off-duty FBI agent exited his vehicle and fatally shot Corrales, an undocumented Venezuelan immigrant, who was firing at a homeless encampment in Pilsen.
2026-10-26	Travis Baker (35)	White	Leroy Township, Calhoun County, Michigan	Calhoun County Sheriff’s Office and Battle Creek Police responded to a home after the suspect's parents were concerned about his behavior, primarily because of him owning firearms on probation. Deputies and officers arrived at the scene before engaging in gunfire. Specialized police vehicles were shot and two drones were shot down. An officer inside the armoured vehicle returned fire before the home engulfed in fire. Baker was found deceased after police put out the fire.
2026-10-25	Joshua Delp (30)	White	Kingsport, Tennessee	At an apartment complex, Sullivan County deputies attempted to make contact with a suspect, Delp, who was wanted on multiple felony warrants. Delp reportedly produced a gun before four deputies shot him.
2026-10-25	Caleb Barber (31)	Unknown	Powell, Tennessee	Knox County deputies responded to a Clinton Highway Weigel's gas station for an armed individual. A deputy shot the suspect for reasons undisclosed.
2026-10-25	Russell A. Scudder-Sumpter (57)	Unknown	North Charleston, South Carolina	A woman who was stabbed by the suspect fled to a neighbor's home and called the police. When police arrived, they found the suspect barricaded himself with another victim with a knife. After negotiations failed, SWAT team entered and fatally shot the suspect. Both victims survived.
2026-10-25	Sebastian Cerda-Monti (40)	Hispanic	West Valley City, Utah	Hotel employees called the police, reporting that a man was found in a storage unit, armed with a metal rod, and threatened to shoot them. Police officers arrived and shot the man when he charged at an officer with metal rods. The footage had been released.
2026-10-25	Sequndo Reyes Lligun (37)	Hispanic	Newark, New Jersey	An off-duty officer was involved in a crash that killed a pedestrian in Upper Roseville.
2026-10-25	Tom Ellison (31)	Black	Augusta, Georgia	A state trooper performed a PIT maneuver on a pursuing vehicle at 12.28 a.m. which caused it to crash. The pursuit started on October 24, 2026, 11.38 p.m.. Ellison, the driver and Waynesboro resident, died of his injuries.
2026-10-23	Jwan Tumblin (31)	Black	Chattanooga, Tennessee	Police responded to a report about a man wanted to harm himself. For reasons undisclosed, an officer shot the man. The man died a day later.
2026-10-23	Maury Jackson (60)	Unknown	Hagerstown, Maryland	Firefighters responded to a house fire when they found a man inside. They requested police to resolve. The man leter ran towards officers. Officers deployed tasers before shooting him. Two knives were recovered on scene.
2026-10-23	unidentified male	Unknown	San Angelo, Texas	DPS trooper attempted a stop on a pickup truck for a seatbelt violation. The driver would then shoot at the trooper before he was struck by returned fire. The trooper was wounded.
2026-10-23	Monty Clyde Riddle Jr. (33)	White	Silsbee, Texas	Lumberton Police responded to a complaint of an unwanted person allegedly in possession of a substantial amount of methamphetamine. A Lumberton PD officer found Riddle in his Tesla with a pistol-type weapon before he sped away. The Tesla eventually came to a stop. Riddle refused to drop the gun before officers fired at him, killing him.
2026-10-23	unidentified male	Black	Philadelphia, Pennsylvania	Multiple 911 callers reported a man standing in the middle of the street with a gun in West Philadelphia. When officers found the man, the man pointed the gun at his head and made suicidal statements. At some point, he walked toward a nearby property and raised the gun at officers. Officers fatally shot him.
2026-10-23	Nathan Dohmen (45)	White	David City, Nebraska	Police initially received a 911 call about a shooting before authorities found a deceased individual. A sheriff later located the homicide suspect's vehicle but was forced to retreat due to gunfire, before suspect fled in the vehicle. State troopers subsequently joined the pursuit of the suspect. After the suspect stopped at a residence, he fired at troopers before being shot.
2026-10-22	Bryan Christopher Franklin (49)	White	Hampton, Tennessee	A subject's vehicle which was involved in a shoplifting and a shooting was located by Carter County deputies. When they tried to stop it, the suspect fled and fired at deputies, prompting a vehicular pursuit. Police later performed a PIT maneuver to terminate the chase. At some point, for reasons unknown, the situation escalated and deputies shot the suspect.
2026-10-21	unidentified male	Unknown	Port Charlotte, Florida	Charlotte County deputies responded to a report of a man threatening a neighbor with a firearm, prompting the neighbor to retreat into their home and call for help. When deputies arrived, the man opened the door, saw the deputies, immediately retreated back into his home, and then emerged with a machete in one hand and a firearm in the other hand. The man pointed the firearm at deputies, before officers returned fire, killing him.
2026-10-21	Timothy Stone (48)	White	Paris, Kentucky	A Paris officer attempted to pull over a Land Rover Freelander driven by Lexington resident Stone, but Stone failed to pull over causing a pursuit. After a PIT maneuver that successfully ended the chase near Hopewell Springs Park in downtown Paris, Stone got out of the Kia armed with a gun, which he fired. Officers fired their weapons in return, fatally shooting him on-scene.
2026-10-21	Thomas Johnson (36)	White	San Diego, California	MTS called police to report a man with an axe allegedly vandalizing a trolley cart at the Morena/Linda Vista station. After locating the man, the man moved toward an officer with the ax before the officer discharged his gun, killing him. The footage had been released.
2026-10-21	Dennis Lloyd Burton (65)	Unknown	Humble, Texas	After Montgomery County deputies alerted Humble officers that a theft suspect is entering the city limits during the afternoon hours, two Humble officers found a black unknown-modeled pickup truck that matched the description of a theft suspect before attempting to make contact with him at the parking lot next to an Academy Sports + Outdoors store. A shootout happened after the man began to open fire at officers, before officers returned fire, killing him.
2026-10-21	Christopher Hall Derrick (47)	White	Pasco, Washington	Richland officers conducted a morning traffic stop of an unknown-modeled vehicle at a residential area to assist the Southeast Regional Internet Crimes Against Children Task Force with an ongoing criminal investigation. While officers were contacting the driver, officers fatally shot the driver dead for unknown reasons.
2026-10-20	Mi Van Nguyen (42)	Asian	Canton, Texas	During the late-evening hours, Canton officer Chris Watson and Van Zandt County deputy Adam Sherifi attempted to serve a warrant on a man for both aggravated assault and aggravated assault of a peace officer out of Canton. As they arrived at a Texas State Highway 178 residence, 800 shots were immediately fired from the suspect with a full-auto rifle at the two officers, killing Sherifi and wounding Watson. At that point, law enforcement returned fire, and the suspect was killed from the law enforcement exchange during the standoff.
2026-10-19	Jeremy Dean Wood (47)	Unknown	Liberty, North Carolina	Two Guilford County deputies responded to a domestic disturbance at a home, where a shootout occurred that left both of them injured and Wood dead.
2026-10-18	James Brian Leyden (57)	Unknown	Stringtown, Butler County, Missouri	Deputies were called to a domestic disturbance at a residence. When the first Butler County deputy arrived on-scene, the officer was confronted by a male armed with a rifle who refused to stop pointing it at him. The deputy fatally shot him back, killing him.
2026-10-18	Cahlan Bowman (40)	White	Goldsby, Oklahoma	Officers responded to a domestic dispute that led to a vehicle collision. For unknown reasons, one officer fatally shot an armed man dead at an open field.
2026-10-18	Jerson David Martinez-Coreva (39)	Hispanic	Chancellor, Virginia	Police were called to a domestic dispute at a residental area. Martinez-Coreva allegedly drove towards officers before shooting at them, hitting one. Another officer returned fire, killing him.
2026-10-17	Justin Shane Heath (67)	White	Angier, North Carolina	An off-duty Durham officer ran a red light and struck Pastor Heath's church van. Heath was killed. Investigators said the officer, Cpl. Joseph King, will be charged with misdemeanor death by motor vehicle. Heath was also a former Wayne County sheriff's deputy.
2026-10-17	Quintin Shadle (31)	White	Tolleson, Arizona	Phoenix, Tolleson, and Glendale officers respond to a report of a man acting violently, armed with a large knife, and threatened people in the lobby of La Quinta Inns & Suites near Interstate 10 in Maryvale Village. When they got there, they found that Tolleson officers had a previous encounter with the same man at a nearby apartment complex, the same apartment complex where callers reported that the man was waving the knife in the air and running toward other bystanders before running inside the nearby Fairfield by Marriott, but left and ran across the street to the La Quinta. The man failed to comply with commands before he was fatally shot by officers.
2026-10-17	unidentified male	Unknown	Long Beach, California	Long Beach officers responded to two gunshots being fired in the California Heights neighborhood near Long Beach Airport. When officers arrived, they contacted a man inside the home who allegedly threatened to shoot at officers. As they retreated to a safe distance and requested additional assistance, the man opened fire at officers, prompting one officer to return fire, striking and killing him. When SWAT officers eventually entered the home, they discovered two men dead from gunshot wounds to their upper bodies. Officers confirmed that one of the men shot and killed is the suspect.
2026-10-16	Gary Thomas Hunt Jr. (73)	Black	Hammond, Indiana	An off-duty Hammond officer driving a black 2024 Chevrolet Silverado who was driving under the influence struck a silver 2021 Toyota Highlander leaving a parking lot at a high rate at speed. A male driver in a gray 2010 Ford Escape was also involved in the crash but survived. The driver of the Highlander died. The Hammond officer was charged. The officer is facing felony charges.
2026-10-16	Jakub Dziemaszkiewicz (43)	White	Bristol, Connecticut	An officer shot and killed a former U.S. Army veteran and Disabled American Veterans worker during a wellness check at a Chippens Hill residence. Authorities said an officer encountered Dziemaszkiewicz outside his home holding a rifle. The officer told Dziemaszkiewicz to drop the weapon, then fired at him three times. The footage had been released by the Office of Inspector General, but without the audio.
2026-10-15	Eric J. Hurtado (36)	Hispanic	Portland, Oregon	PPD officers responded to a report of a man physically and verbally assaulting people and stabbing two men, partially identified as a security officer and a café worker, with a box cutter with a broken blade in downtown Portland. Authorities confirmed that the man entered the Oregon Wines shop and the lobby of the Dossier Hotel, screaming, crying, throwing his phone and wallet across the hall, and acting erratically. Both stabbings happened separately, with the café worker being stabbed from inside his own business. A confrontation happened after officers arrived, and one officer fatally shot him dead. Both men were treated at a nearby hospital with non-life-threatening injuries, and the officer who shot the suspect was placed on paid administrative leave. The footage had been released.
2026-10-15	Saul Licon (40)	Hispanic	Hobbs, New Mexico	An officer pulled over a bicycle driven by Licon who encountered him before Licon fled on the bicycle through several streets before entering an alleyway. After entering the alleyway, Licon got off the bicycle and ran off on-foot. For unknown reasons, one officer fatally shot him dead.
2026-10-15	Joshua A. Baker (41)	White	Hookerton, North Carolina	Greene County deputies responded to a two-vehicle crash near the grounds of Maury Correctional Institution, with one of the vehicles involved in the accident being a correctional institution vehicle. Deputies learned during a 911 call that one of the drivers tried to harm himself and harm the passenger inside. Deputies shot and killed Baker from inside one of the wrecked vehicles in order to save the woman. The man died at a nearby hospital a day later.
2026-10-15	James Asa Hardison (41)	White	Jamesville, North Carolina	NCHP troopers pursued an unidentified vehicle through a neighboring county until the pursuit ended near Jamesville, before an armed suspect barricaded from inside a residence. Shots were fired from inside the residence and law enforcement returned fire, striking and killing him.
2026-10-14	Dustin Alan Long (38)	White	Des Moines, Iowa	A police officer stopped Long's vehicle for a lighting equipment violation when Long gave a false name, fled on foot, and fought with the officer. After the encounter, Long entered his vehicle, leading to a vehicular pursuit. Police later performed a PIT maneuver on his vehicle. The vehicle lost control and crashed, killing Long and the passenger, Doggett, inside.
2026-10-14	April Elizabeth Doggett (31)	White	Des Moines, Iowa	A police officer stopped Long's vehicle for a lighting equipment violation when Long gave a false name, fled on foot, and fought with the officer. After the encounter, Long entered his vehicle, leading to a vehicular pursuit. Police later performed a PIT maneuver on his vehicle. The vehicle lost control and crashed, killing Long and the passenger, Doggett, inside.
2026-10-14	Daniel James Ruiz (23)	Hispanic	Bakersfield, California	Officers attempted to make contact with two men in the southeast part of the city when they both fled off on-foot. During the pursuit, one officer fatally shot one of the men when he pulled out a weapon.
2026-10-14	Justin Flanders (41)	White	Erda, Utah	Pleasant Grove officers requested agency assistance as they followed an unidentified vehicle on Interstate 80 driven by a wanted fugitive into portions of Salt Lake County and Tooele County. Multiple agencies, including UHP, responded to assist and attempted a traffic stop after the man exited mile marker 94, but the man continued to yield, leading to a brief pursuit until he veered through traffic and side-swiped a semi-truck, causing him to roll over several times on Utah State Route 179 near the Utah State Route 138 exit. Six officers fatally shot the man dead after encountering, and all were placed on paid administrative leave afterward.
2026-10-14	William B. Davis Jr. (85)	White	Goose Creek, South Carolina	Berkeley County deputies responded to a disturbance at a residence that turned into a shooting halfway through the response. While the victim was being treated with a gunshot wound, an armed man emerged from the home with a weapon, before officers fatally shot him dead.
2026-10-14	unidentified female (70s)	Unknown	Chesterfield, Virginia	Officers responded to reports of an armed and suicidal female experiencing a mental health crisis at the Roper Forest Trail parking lot near Pocahontas State Park. When officers arrived, they began searching for the woman for help. During the search, the woman came out from the wood line armed with a handgun and opened fire at officers, causing officers to fatally fire back.
2026-10-13	Manuel Benardino Munoz (62)	Hispanic	Murray, Utah	Officers responded to an armed and suicidal man experiencing a mental health crisis at a residental area near Interstate 15. For unknown reasons, one officer fatally shot him dead. Details on the interaction were not made immediately available.
2026-10-13	Donquez Thomas (26)	Black	Stone Mountain, Georgia	DeKalb County deputies responded to a domestic incident during the morning hours. As they arrived, they found a Lithonian man holding a handgun and forcibly pushing a woman carrying an infant down the street by her clothing. Officers confronted Thomas and ordered him to release the woman and child and drop his weapon but refused to comply. One officer fatally shot him dead, and neither the victims nor officers were hurt.
2026-10-13	Ryan A. Morrow (46)	White	Evansville, Indiana	A juvenile called 911 after witnessing her mother being dragged into a house by a local man, who according to the 911 caller, replied that the man was "someone that her mother had a protective order against". Inside, the man shot the victim in the abdomen, which she survived. As officers arrived, a flashbang was used during the standoff. The man opened the front door and pointed his malfunctioned gun at officers before officers fired multiple shots back at him, killing him. The footage had been released from a press conference.
2026-10-13	Gregory Dobkins (51)	White	Boynton Beach, Florida	On October 12, a West Palm Beach man with an extensive criminal history ordered Domino's Pizza by using a fake name. When his Domino's order was delivered, the man approached the delivery man, identified himself, and stated that he only had a $100 bill and needed change. After counting change, the man pulled out a pistol, fatally shot him dead, stole his money, ran off, and fled in a black 2020 Chevrolet Silverado. As the victim gave information on the suspect's Silverado and license plate to police, a Palm Beach County helicopter located his Silverado the next morning traveling north in Lake Park. An attempted traffic stop turned into a pursuit, and continued into the southbound lanes of Interstate 95 until he exited the highway through mile marker 56 in Boynton Beach. The pursuit ended with a crash at an intersection near the Shoppes at Woolbright in the Sun Valley neighborhood. The man got out of his Silverado as officers believed he was armed with a gun that was hidden underneath his shirt before fleeing on foot. During the foot pursuit, he took cover behind a cement light pole but was found by a deputy. The man raised his hands in a shooting position, before one Palm Beach County deputy fatally shot him dead. The officer who shot him was placed on paid administrative leave after the shooting.
2026-10-12	Jaden I. Handley (19)	Black	Fort Wayne, Indiana	FWPD officers responded to a suicidal man experiencing a mental health crisis acting violently at his Crown Colony residence. Officers tried to talk to him when he refused to respond back. During the encounter, the man walked to the kitchen and grabbed a knife. He was told to drop the knife, and when he didn’t comply, he was tased but was ineffective. Two officers shot the man when he continued to walk toward them with the knife. He was taken to a nearby hospital but died from his injuries four days later on October 16. The footage had been released.
2026-10-12	Edwin Michael Adams (56)	Black	San Francisco, California	According to SFPD, officers spotted a wanted Pittsburg, California man on a scooter in SoMa before they attempted to arrest him, the man fled before colliding with a street fixture, killing himself. Contradictorily, three eyewitnesses interviewed by Mission Local disputed this statement, claiming a possible undercover police officer cut off the suspect with his gray second-generation Ford Fusion and "football tackled" the suspect, whose head subsequently struck the metal pole, leading to his death. Authorities confirmed that Adams was wanted "for failing to charge his ankle monitor". Later footage released by a public defender had proven that San Francisco Police Department and official reports provided a fabricated story and equivocated about the incident. Footage shows an officer tackled Adams to the ground when Adams was killed, which aligns with the witnesses' statement.
2026-10-11	Carlesha Fifer (19)	Black	Memphis, Tennessee	Two MPD officers in a marked sixth-generation Ford Explorer were in the middle of responding to a homicide scene with lights and sirens activated when their Explorer T-boned another vehicle which crossed a red light at an intersection in Hickory Hill. Five of the six occupants of the vehicle were killed, with one underwent multiple surgeries and survived. Both officers were seriously injured.
2026-10-11	Rodney McNeal (20)	Black	Memphis, Tennessee	Two MPD officers in a marked sixth-generation Ford Explorer were in the middle of responding to a homicide scene with lights and sirens activated when their Explorer T-boned another vehicle which crossed a red light at an intersection in Hickory Hill. Five of the six occupants of the vehicle were killed, with one underwent multiple surgeries and survived. Both officers were seriously injured.
2026-10-11	Syria Fifer (21)	Black	Memphis, Tennessee	Two MPD officers in a marked sixth-generation Ford Explorer were in the middle of responding to a homicide scene with lights and sirens activated when their Explorer T-boned another vehicle which crossed a red light at an intersection in Hickory Hill. Five of the six occupants of the vehicle were killed, with one underwent multiple surgeries and survived. Both officers were seriously injured.
2026-10-11	Messiah Lee (20)	Black	Memphis, Tennessee	Two MPD officers in a marked sixth-generation Ford Explorer were in the middle of responding to a homicide scene with lights and sirens activated when their Explorer T-boned another vehicle which crossed a red light at an intersection in Hickory Hill. Five of the six occupants of the vehicle were killed, with one underwent multiple surgeries and survived. Both officers were seriously injured.
2026-10-11	Amerika Brown (17)	Black	Memphis, Tennessee	Two MPD officers in a marked sixth-generation Ford Explorer were in the middle of responding to a homicide scene with lights and sirens activated when their Explorer T-boned another vehicle which crossed a red light at an intersection in Hickory Hill. Five of the six occupants of the vehicle were killed, with one underwent multiple surgeries and survived. Both officers were seriously injured.
2026-10-11	Leslie May (48)	White	Independence, Missouri	An Independence officer in a marked 2024 Ford Explorer was in the middle of responding to an emergency call with its lights and siren activated when his Explorer T-boned an Audi Q5 at an intersection. The driver inside was killed and the officer was injured. Preliminary evidence indicated that the officer had a green light and the Audi faced a red light that caused the T-bone.
2026-10-11	Hurman Roberts (52)	White	Foyil, Oklahoma	Officers responded to a report of a man chasing a person with a knife. After officers made contact with a man who lives inside an RV, the man came in and out of his RV and made death threats. Deputies first used a beanbag launcher, hitting the man, but the suspect continued to threaten officers with a tactical-styled knife, causing officers to shoot him dead.
2026-10-11	Ted Lieu (69)	Asian	San Jose, California	Shortly before midnight, SJPD officers responded to a report of an argument between an intoxicated and armed landlord and a tenant at a South San Jose residence in the Locke neighborhood. The report confirms that the landlord was waving a gun before police arrived. During the altercation, officers fatally shot the landlord dead after the landlord brandished the gun.
2026-10-11	Larry Wayne Tate Jr. (49)	White	Welcome, North Carolina	Davidson County deputies and NCHP troopers were involved in a pursuit of a black second-generation Nissan Frontier D40 Crew Cab that started off as a domestic incident when the chase ended at a Food Lion parking lot. After the pursuit, for unknown reasons, six Davidson County deputies and one NCHP trooper fatally shot the Lexington man dead. Authorities confirmed that shots from police were fired through a nearby Dollar General and a Domino's Pizza, but nobody was injured. Tate died one day after his 49th birthday.
2026-10-11	Chau Martika Duncan (32)	Black	Jacksonville, Florida	JSO deputies responded to a report of a woman pointing a gun at a man's head in the city's Highlands neighborhood, and threatening to kill him. Four deputies arrived and determined that she previously dealt with police in a separate incident beforehand. The woman screamed at officers while carrying several bags. Officers asked her several times to show her hands, but she did not comply and kept walking away. She pulled out a gun from one of the bags and opened fire once, hitting the driver’s side door of one of the patrol vehicles, before three officers fatally shot the suspect. The footage had been released.
2026-10-10	unidentified female (26)	Unknown	Titusville, Florida	Brevard County Sheriff's Agent Kevin Morris, who was reponding to a fatal officer-involved shooting in Mims (the incident below), collided with a wrong-way driver in a head-on crash. Both Agent Morris and the driver was killed.
2026-10-10	unidentified male (79)	Unknown	Mims, Florida	Brevard County deputies responded to a home to conduct a welfare check on a suicidal subject. After contacting the subject, deputies determined the circumstances met the criteria of the Baker Act and called paramedics to provide assistance. After paramedics arrived, the subject pointed a concealed gun at deputies when they fatally shot him in response.
2026-10-10	Luis Antonio Morales (36)	Hispanic	Pueblo, Colorado	Police responded to a home invasion and learned that the suspect had fled in a Dodge Ram. Officers chased the suspect to the home where he abandoned the Ram. When they knocked on the door, the suspect answered and shot at officers on scene. In response, they fired back and killed the suspect. Both officers also shot each other during the shootout. The footage had been released.
2026-10-10	unidentified male	Unknown	Phoenix, Arizona	Police responded to a report of a man armed with a gun and a knife around a Townsend Park apartment complex. Despite officers used pepperballs to try to get him to comply, he refused orders and raised the gun at officers before being fatally shot. The footage had been released.
2026-10-10	Salaheddine Yagoub (32)	Middle Eastern	Stoughton, Massachusetts	Officers fatally shot a Winthrop man who attempted to run over pedestrians with a Mazda CX-5 near the Public House shortly after midnight. Authorities stated that Yagoub got into his argument before getting into his Mazda and collided with an unidentified parked vehicle. Yagoub drove away from the corner once police arrived. A taser was used but was unsuccessful.
2026-10-09	unidentified male	Unknown	Duncan, Oklahoma	An officer initiated a traffic stop near a residential intersection on a possible stolen vehicle. During the stop, officers were advised that the driver was armed with a weapon. One officer fatally shot the man after the man became uncooperative and pulled out the weapon.
2026-10-09	Darion Thompson (26)	Black	Washington, Pennsylvania	Pennsylvania State Police attempted to serve a search warrant on a suspect related to the alleged possession of child pornography. After a woman let them inside, the troopers encountered Thompson, who was armed with a gun, before they fatally shot him.
2026-10-09	William Austin (60)	Unknown	Philadelphia, Pennsylvania	Police responded to reports of a man with a gun in Center City, who opened fire before the first 911 call. When they arrived at the intersection of Benjamin Franklin Parkway and North 21st Street, they tried to de-escalate the situation by using the bullhorn but the man didn't comply. The man fired one shot, leading a SEPTA officer and a PPD officer to shoot him.
2026-10-08	unidentified female (65)	Unknown	Olive Township, Ottawa County, Michigan	A Honda Ridgeline collided with a Chevrolet Equinox in the opposite lane a Ottawa County deputy was heading. Moments later, the collision sent the Honda across the centerline and then collided with the deputy's cruiser. The Honda driver from Zeeland died in the incident, while the Equinox driver was uninjured.
2026-10-08	Jeanne Seto (36)	Unknown	Bath, New Hampshire	State troopers and local police were pursuing a vehicle for reasons unknown. After the vehicle stopped at an intersection, a woman exited it while armed. Law enforcement officers on scene shot and killed her.
2026-10-08	unidentified male	Unknown	Commerce, California	An LASD deputy who was driving a cruiser responding to a call crashed into another vehicle, killing the driver inside. The impacted vehicle then struck a third vehicle during the chain reaction. The deputy was also injured.
2026-10-08	Jack Henson II (42)	White	Nashville, Tennessee	An out-of-state man from Bear Creek, Chatham County, North Carolina, was fatally shot by a USMS Contracted security officer from inside the lobby near the checkpoint of the Fred D. Thompson U.S. Courthouse and Federal Building. According to police, Henson pulled out a pistol, but his gun was jammed as he attempted to open fire, before he pulled out a knife in front of the officer. Henson charged towards the officer before the officer fatally shot Henson. Authorities say that Henson had ties to Nashville but was not from the city nor metropolitan area at the time of his death.
2026-10-07	Nafetelai Teisina (31)	Pacific Islander	Hawaiian Ocean View, Hawaii	A female witness told a Hawaii County officer about an alleged vehicle theft in the Mālama Market parking lot, before pointing towards the suspicious man, Teisina. As officers attempted to make contact, Teisina fled on foot south of Prince Kūhiō Boulevard and into a nearby area of dense brush and unstable lava rock. During the chase, Teisina began to threaten officers while reaching for rocks. Teisina threw two rocks, with one missing officers, and the other one hitting one officer, causing his arm to bleed. As he attempted to throw the second rock, he shouted "See what you guys do to me, huh? You make me suffer!". One other officer gave loud verbal commands and deployed his taser multiple times, but was ineffective before pulling out his service weapon and shot him dead. The footage was released.
2026-10-05	Michael Carr (61)	Unknown	Billings, Montana	Police responded to a restraining order that needed to be served, with a second call saying Carr, the subject, had pulled a gun on the caller. An officer found Carr in a carport and shot him after he allegedly pulled a gun out.
2026-10-05	Amanda Buckner (38)	White	Aiken, South Carolina	Police responded to a home to investigate a hit-and-run earlier the day after the suspected vehicle linked to Buckner's truck. Upon arrival, Aiken County deputies encountered Buckner before she struck a patrol car and drove away, prompting a chase. At some point, she opened the driver's side door, shot a deputy, and rammed over the deputy. Another deputy shot her dead in response.
2026-10-04	Ingold Guttenbeil (34)	Pacific Islander	Arden-Arcade, California	Sacramento County deputies responded to a report of a man asleep at the Change Carwash parking lot with a gun on his lap near an intersection. Police said the man also fired shots at the same intersection days ago. When they honk at him to wake him up, he didn't comply and reached down. Deputies then fatally shot him.
2026-10-04	Joey Ray Dawson (24)	White	Inverness, Florida	A Hobart, Oklahoma man called police and threatened to kill everyone in the house if deputies did not arrive within 10 minutes. Police stated that the address did not belong to the caller, Dawson, and it was used to lure Citrus County deputies there. Upon deputies' arrival, they encountered Joey in a gas mask and hiding his hands inside a large backpack. Shortly thereafter, he pulled out a black object before four deputies fatally shot him. Authorities later confirmed the object was a radio instead of a gun, and the four deputies were immediately placed on administrative leave.
2026-10-04	Haley Rodriguez (27)	Hispanic	Gates, New York	An officer was on patrol in the early morning when he encountered a woman standing in the road with a revolver. When the officer asked the woman if he could assist her, she pointed the gun at the officer, leading him to shoot her. The gun was later determined to be a replica. The footage had been released by police.
2026-10-04	Michael Wayne Schmidt (47)	White	Topeka, Kansas	Topeka officers fatally shot a man who was released from jail three days after Schmidt was released from jail on his own recognizance after a domestic violence arrest on October 1. The shooting happened when Schmidt allowed officers into his house and violated a protection order. When officers tried to arrest Schmidt, he went to a back room and grabbed a handgun, before officers fatally shot him dead.
2026-10-04	Ropati Tauiliili (48)	Pacific Islander	Henderson, Nevada	Tauiliili, a former Waipahu, Hawaii gang member previously convicted in a February 1997 killing of a Oahu man and previously served 15 years in prison, was fatally shot by Henderson police during a domestic violence situation. On October 3, Tauiliili went to a house, battered a family member, and then pointed a gun at multiple family members before leaving. Later that evening, officers were called back to the same home, where they found an adult woman suffering from gunshot wounds which she survived. Police spotted Tauiliili inside Davis Funeral Home, the exact funeral home where his mother was buried. Tauiliili began firing his weapon at officers and a Metro Air Unit drone before Henderson police called SWAT. Tauiliili reportedly continued firing at officers with an AR-style weapon into the midnight hours, and demands suicide-by-cop. Henderson police returned fire and fatally shot Tauiliili. The footage was released in a press conference.
2026-10-03	Persephone Berger (16)	White	Park Hills, Missouri	A sheriff's deputy responded to a report of an unresponsive individual and accidentally ran over Berger, who had just left a party and was walking home. Berger's family told a news outlet that police initially reported her death as a hit-and-run.
2026-10-03	Jerome Green (46)	Unknown	Summerville, South Carolina	A man flagged down police officers and told them he had killed someone. When officers attempted to arrest him, he resisted, leading officers to tase and restrain him. He became unresponsive and died shortly afterward. Police did not release details about whether the man was a suspect of homicide or not.
2026-10-03	Kevin Joe Monday (59)	White	Spring Hill, Florida	Hernando County deputies responded to a domestic violence at a residence in the afternoon, after a report indicating that Monday made a violent threat toward his child under ten years old. After the initial incident, shortly before 8 p.m., he exited his vehicle and shot toward a patrol vehicle. The officer inside wasn't injured. Additional deputies subsequently arrived and fatally shot him.
2026-10-03	Izaeah Elajah-Amar Washington (26)	Black	Albuquerque, New Mexico	A NMSP officer came across two men who were jaywalking and attempted to detain them. One individual, Washington, fled, before a fight with the officer ensued. Washington discharged a gun when the officer shot and killed him. The officer wasn't hit by gunfire. Police said the gun Washington possessed was stolen. NMSP officials confirm that the shooting was captured by a television crew member for the television show Cops. The footage from the officer's bodycam and the television production crew had been released by NMSP.
2026-10-03	Zadarious Dorsey (18)	Black	Newnan, Georgia	A Newnan officer spotted a white unidentified Kia with five men inside, including Dorsey. Five men immediately exited the Kia, with one walking toward a home while four others ran away. One of the fleeing four men, Dorsey, pulled out a handgun from his waistband before the officer shot him several times after telling him to drop it. He was pronounced dead afterward.
2026-10-02	unidentified male	Black	Gardena, California	An officer pulled a man over for a code violation. During the stop, the man allegedly reached for a firearm and pointed it at the officer, who shot him.
2026-10-02	Jamir Cave (26)	Black	Philadelphia, Pennsylvania	PPD officers in the Mayfair neighborhood were called to a man who attempted to break into several houses. Officers attempted to stop the man, but the man fled on-foot through Frankford Avenue. The foot pursuit ended near the Mr. Storage self-storage facility building where a confrontation occurred between the man and two officers, before both officers fatally shot him dead.
2026-10-02	Brandon Whitworth (49)	White	Bayonet Point, Florida	Two Pasco County deputies spotted a homeless trespasser behind the Oasis Gas Plus express store near the Publix at Tower Oaks Terrace who was screaming, threatening other people, and armed with a 7½ inch butcher knife. One of the deputies opened fire on Whitworth, killing him. Whitworth, of New Port Richey, had a history of arrests, including 18 arrests in Pasco County and 11 felony convictions.
2026-10-01	Carl Remble (27)	Unknown	Memphis, Tennessee	According to state police, Remble was fleeing state troopers, driving 120 miles per hour. During the chase, a trooper performed a PIT maneuver, causing Remble's car to spin off the road. It hit a brick mailbox and a utility pole before it caught fire. Remble died and a passenger was injured.
2026-10-01	Cyle Fabrizio (25)	White	Moundsville, West Virginia	A local suicidal man fatally shot a local high school teacher and her husband at a residence before attempting to open fire on officers and holding a juvenile hostage with a pistol to the victim's head. One Marshall County deputy fatally shot Fabrizio in the head, killing him, and the juvenile was immediately released unharmed.
2026-10-01	Johnathan Moore (34)	White	Akron, Ohio	Members of the Northern Ohio Violent Fugitive Task Force were at the house to serve an arrest warrant on vandalism nearly a mile south of the University of Akron campus grounds. Officers made contact with two people living in the home before they encountered a locked bedroom door and knocking the bedroom door down in order to make the arrest. As they entered, they found Moore holding a gun. Moore, who had an extensive criminal history, failed to follow commands, which prompted an officer to deploy his taser. He attempted to shoot himself in the head before one officer fatally shot him dead. The footage was released.

== See also ==
- Death in custody § United States
- Henry A. Wallace Police Crime Public Database
- List of cases of police brutality
- List of countries with annual rates and counts for killings by law enforcement officers
- List of law enforcement officers killed in the line of duty in the United States
- List of law enforcement officers convicted for an on-duty killing in the United States
- List of shootings by US immigration agents
- List of police reforms related to the George Floyd protests
- List of unarmed African Americans killed by law enforcement officers in the United States
- Lists of killings by law enforcement officers
- Police brutality in the United States
- Police misconduct § United States
- Police riot § United States
- Police use of deadly force in the United States
