= Benson Grist Mill =

Coordinates: 40.649387°N 112.296753°W

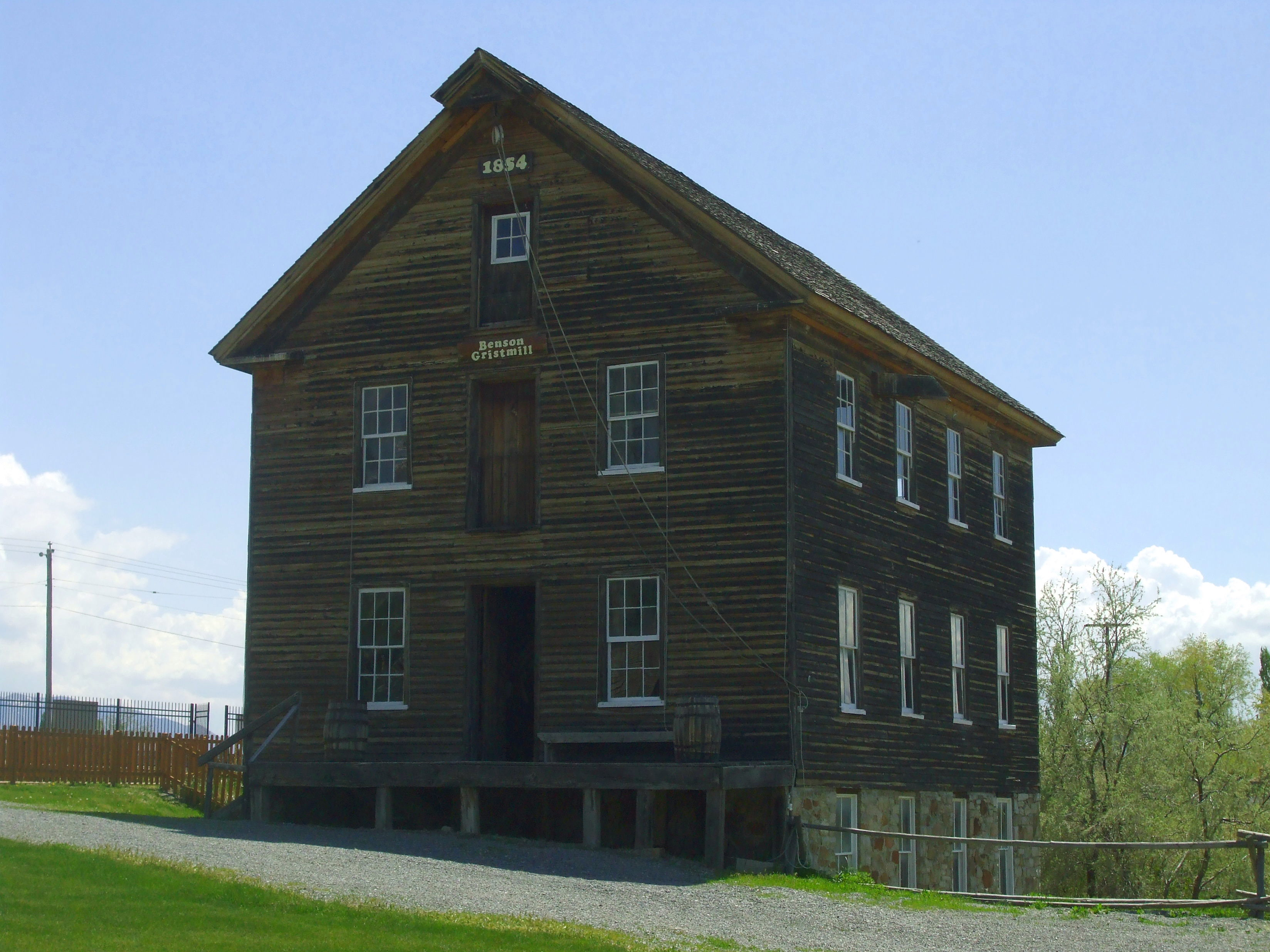
- Established: 1851 (original); June 11, 1988 (museum restoration)
- Location: Stansbury Park, Utah
- Type: restoration and replica museum
- Visitors: 10,000 - 12,000 per year
- Director: Jody Brunson
- Website: http://www.bensonmill.org/

Benson Grist Mill is a restoration-replica museum located in Tooele County, Utah in the western United States, which allows visitors to see the inner workings of a latter-nineteenth-century pioneer gristmill. It has four other historic (nineteenth-century) buildings which have been moved onto the site, as well as four ancillary structures, including an open-air pavilion. It covers 6.98 acres (2.82 hectare) along State Highway 138, 0.8 mile southwest of the intersection of the Road with State Highway 36 (known as Mills Junction). The museum is owned and operated by a division of Tooele County.

== History ==
History of Tooele County, published by Tooele County Daughters of Utah Pioneers in 1961, states: "A gristmill was built in 1854 at Lake Point, Utah, then known as Twin Springs Creek. Thomas Lee was hired by the church corporation to erect the mill. It was located near the Saw Mill and Tannery. Among members of the corporation were John Rowberry, Ezra T. Benson and Benjamin Crosland. Rowberry moved his family from Tooele to the mill location where he supervised the mill. E.T. Benson acquired sole ownership of the mill from the corporation as is attested by the following bill of sale copied from the records of the county. 'June 23, 1866, E.T. Benson to Brigham Young the sum of $3,333.33 for all claim to the gristmill known as Bensons Mill located on Twin Springs. Consisting of an adobe dwelling house, sheep sheds, cattle and sheep corrals, pig pens, hen house and all other out houses; also water rights.'

"This mill (the original building still exists) was noted for its honesty and integrity. A favorite expression of the early settlers, when the safety of their possessions was in question was, 'As safe as flour in the lower mill!'

"The mill changed hands many times during the next few years after serving the people for many useful years; it was abandoned in the early 1900s."

In 1850, Brigham Young, President of the Church of Jesus Christ of Latter-day Saints (LDS Church), authorized Ezra T. Benson, a member of the Quorum of the Twelve Apostles, to develop a mill site in the north end of the Tooele Valley, to serve the communities being proposed for that area. By 1851 a sawmill was operating at the site, and in 1854 the Lee brothers were hired to build a grist mill. In 1854 the area was called "Richville", and served as the area's first county seat (Tooele City was named the county seat in 1861). The mill itself was named the "E.T. Benson Flour Mill". In 1860 Brigham Young purchased the mill (in the name of the church), when Benson moved to the Cache Valley, some 100 miles north of the grist mill.

By 1862 the mill was named "Young and Rowberry's". John Rowberry lived in the mill area, and had been called as bishop of the local congregation in the area, which was known as either "Milltown" or "Richville" (both names appear on documents of the era).

In 1922 a former Grantsville, Utah resident, J. Reuben Clark (who was living in Salt Lake City, where he practiced law), purchased the mill property. By that time its wood waterwheel and its millstones had been replaced by a metal turbine and imported "grain breakers". The mill continued to operate until 1938 to grind flour for area residents, but after that it was used intermittently for a few years to grind meal for animals. The last mill operator was Oscar C. Jones, who departed the site in 1939.

In 1970 the Clark family sold the area containing the mill to Terracor Corporation, as part of its planning to develop a planned community (Stansbury Park, named for the Stansbury Mountain Range along the west side of the valley). However, the corporation had no immediate plan for the mill itself, and it lay unused and neglected for another 25 years. By the 1980s the mill was in serious disrepair, largely open to the elements and allowing unfettered access.

It was listed on the U.S. National Register of Historic Places in 1972.

== Restoration ==
In 1983 a Stansbury Park resident, John "Jack" Smith, formed a committee to acquire and restore the historic mill. The committee succeeded in getting the mill property deeded to Tooele County, and in causing the county to create a governmental unit to oversee the mill's restoration and operation.

Restoration of the mill and construction or repair of the other facilities and structures at the site were largely completed by volunteer effort, with financial assistance from the county. By the late 1980s visitors were being accepted to tour the site.

== Structures ==
A pioneer-era-style building has been erected east of the mill, to serve as a site office. A similar building was erected northwest of the mill to serve as a Country Store, selling artifacts and mementos.

The Bolinder Blacksmith Shop, which was built in nearby Grantsville, Utah nearly a century ago, was moved onto the Mill site in 1987. Its interior has been preserved to show the blacksmithing trade environment.

The Forsyth Pioneer Cabin, which was erected in 1872, west of Adobe Rock, was built by Andrew Barker Forsyth for his bride, Emily Elizabeth Moss. Andrew had come to Tooele County in 1866 with his father, who managed the nearby Grantsville Woolen Mill (the walls of which are still standing and visible from Highway 36). The Forsyth Cabin was donated and moved to the Benson Grist Mill historic site in 1986.

A barn houses relics and equipment from pioneer-era farms and ranches in Tooele Valley.

An open-air pavilion was erected by community volunteers in 2000 on the site, and is used for community events.

== Scheduled events ==
- Pioneer Fun at the Mill (July)
- Harvest Days - Farmers Market (Saturdays Only, mid June to mid October)
- Harvest Festival (Friday and Saturday in October)
- Christmas Lighting event (Monday evening after Thanksgiving)
- Tooele County Arts Guild Ren Faire 2023

== See also ==
- Stansbury Park
- Lake Point, Utah
- Adobe Rock
