= Adobe Rock =

Large rock face in Utah, United States

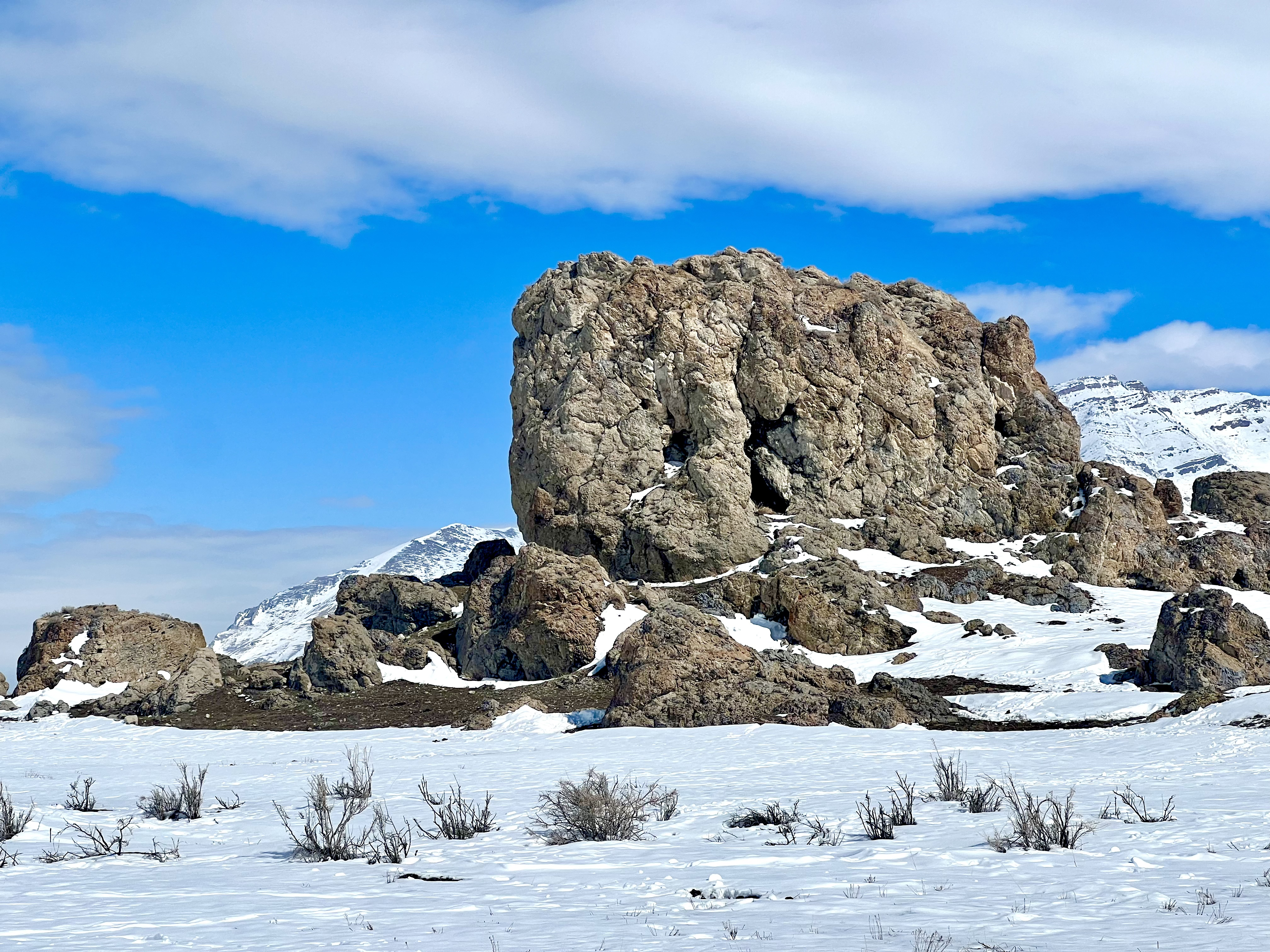
- Looking northeast towards Lake Point, Utah, viewing the southern face of Adobe Rock

Highest point
- Elevation: 4,298 ft (1,310 m)
- Coordinates: 40°39′36″N 112°17′18″W

Geography
- Location within Utah
- Location: Tooele County
- Country: United States
- State: Utah
- Parent range: Oquirrh Mountains

Adobe Rock is described by the USGS as a pediment at Lake Point, Utah. The large rock outcropping sits adjacent to SR-36 just north of SR-138 at Mills Junction. Because of its distance from the steep incline of the Oquirrh Mountains and its prominent location on the edge of a hill, Adobe Rock has served as a natural landmark in Tooele Valley ever since the first pioneers traversed the Hastings Cutoff trail. Though not officially a national monument like its nearby peer Black Rock (Great Salt Lake), it has equal significance as a navigating landmark and cultural significance as a monument with businesses using the Adobe Rock name, books using its images on their covers, and Lake Point, Utah depicting its likeness as their city logo.

== History ==
On July 27, 1947, The Daughters of Utah Pioneers installed a Utah Historical Marker on the west side of Adobe Rock to designate it as a historical monument in Tooele County, Utah. The marker says it was placed by the Tooele County Company of the Daughters of Utah Pioneers, DUP marker No. 103.

On July 27, 1847, three horsemen from the scouting party sent out by Brigham Young, obtained an excellent view of the surrounding valley, from the top of this rock. In 1849, Captain Howard Stansbury of the United States Topographical Engineers built a small adobe house by this rock, for his herders, hence the name "Adobe Rock". The near by highway follows the same route as the old pioneer trail used by explorers, trappers, emigrants and gold seekers. A spring near by made this a favorite camp site.

— Daughters of Utah Pioneers

== Land Use ==
Although Adobe Rock makes a major visual impact throughout Tooele Valley, it is completely inaccessible to the public. The land is privately owned by Kennecott Utah Copper LLC and fenced off for use of horse pastures. On October 18, 2018, the Tooele County Planning Commission approved Kennecott's proposed rezoning plan to develop 1,444 acres around Adobe Rock and across SR-36 into a large mixed-use housing development called Adobe Rock Ranch. This plan encompassed adding 4,710 residential units along with a variety of commercial, retail, and open space. Residents who opposed the Adobe Rock Ranch rezoning plan gathered enough signatures to allow a vote to revoke the approval of the county. During the 2020 United States elections a large majority of Tooele County residents voted no on Proposition #2: Adobe Rock Ranch which ended county approval for the Kennecott development plan.

== See also ==
- Oquirrh Mountains
- Black Rock (Great Salt Lake)
- Lake Point, Utah
- Stansbury Park
