= Utah State Route 179 =

Proposed highway

State Route 179
- Midvalley Highway
- SR 179 highlighted in red

Route information
- Length: 13.2 mi (21.2 km) Mileage reflects the route at full build-out.
- Existed: 2018–present

Major junctions
- South end: SR-36 near Tooele
- SR-112 in Tooele; SR-138 in Erda
- North end: I-80 near Stansbury Park

Location
- Country: United States
- State: Utah

Highway system
- Utah State Highway System; Interstate; US; State; Minor; Scenic
← SR-178	→ SR-180

State Route 179, also known as the Midvalley Highway, is a highway in the U.S. state of Utah. It runs through the northern part of the Tooele Valley, located in eastern Tooele County.

== Route description ==
The Midvalley Highway is proposed to begin at SR-36 south of the city of Tooele, proceeding to the northwest. After crossing the Union Pacific Railroad's main line, it will turn to the northeast, passing the east side of the Utah Industrial Depot. After passing the depot, it will turn to the northwest again before crossing SR-112 at 1000 North. The route will cross Sheep Lane and Erda Way before reaching SR-138, where it will turn back to the northeast. It will proceed northeast to a trumpet interchange at Interstate 80, where it will end. At full build-out, the highway will be approximately 13.2 miles (21.2 km) long, consisting of 3.7 miles (6.0 km) of arterial and 9.5 miles (15.3 km) of freeway.

== History ==
=== Planning ===
The need for a highway running down the center of the Tooele Valley had been identified by 2001, when it was recognized that the existing SR-36 would not have enough capacity for future traffic volumes. Although initial remedies included widening SR-36 and a new 1000 North extension (now part of SR-112), planners knew the Midvalley Highway would eventually be needed as a long-term solution.

By January 2011, UDOT released an Environmental Impact Statement defining a Preferred Alternative for the route. A Travel Demand and Crash Data Review was completed in November 2013.

On May 11, 2018, the Utah Transportation Commission signed a resolution designating State Route 179 as the official number for the Midvalley Highway, defining SR-179 as the proposed highway from SR-138 north to I-80. The same resolution also mandated that SR-138 end at the Midvalley Highway; the segment between there and SR-36 will revert to Tooele County jurisdiction. However, these changes are contingent on the construction of the relevant segment of the new Midvalley Highway, and as such were not included in the 2019 Legislature's annual state highway amendments bill.

=== Construction ===
The Utah Department of Transportation is currently working with Tooele County to design Phase 1 of the project. This phase will consist of a two-lane freeway from Interstate 80 to the current SR-138, a distance of 4.5 miles (7.2 km). In addition, the existing SR-138 roadway will be realigned, and a new intersection will be constructed at Sheep Lane. Pre-construction work will begin in summer 2019, but major construction is not expected until 2021.

== Future ==
Plans call for the segment between I-80 and SR-112 to be eventually upgraded to a four-lane freeway, with the portion between SR-36 and SR-112 becoming a four-lane arterial. Interchanges are proposed at I-80, SR-138, 1000 North (SR-112), and the future 3400 North parkway, with at-grade intersections planned for Utah Avenue (former SR-112) and SR-36. Grade separations will be provided at the Union Pacific Railroad line, Erda Way, Sheep Lane, and the future Midvalley Trail.

== Major intersections ==
This table reflects the full proposed routing. The entire route is in Tooele County.

Location	mi	km	Exit	Destinations	Notes
Tooele				SR-36 (Main Street)	Planned southern terminus
Tooele				SR-112 (1000 North)	Planned interchange; proposed southern end of freeway
Erda				3400 North	Planned interchange
Erda	0.00	0.00	—	SR-138	Future interchange; current southern terminus
	4.5	7.2	3	I-80 Reno, Salt Lake City	Northern terminus; signed as exits 3A (I-80 west) and 3B (I-80 east)
1.000 mi = 1.609 km; 1.000 km = 0.621 mi: Unopened

== See also ==
- List of state highways in Utah
