= Black Rock (Great Salt Lake) =

- Black Rock Site
- U.S. National Register of Historic Places
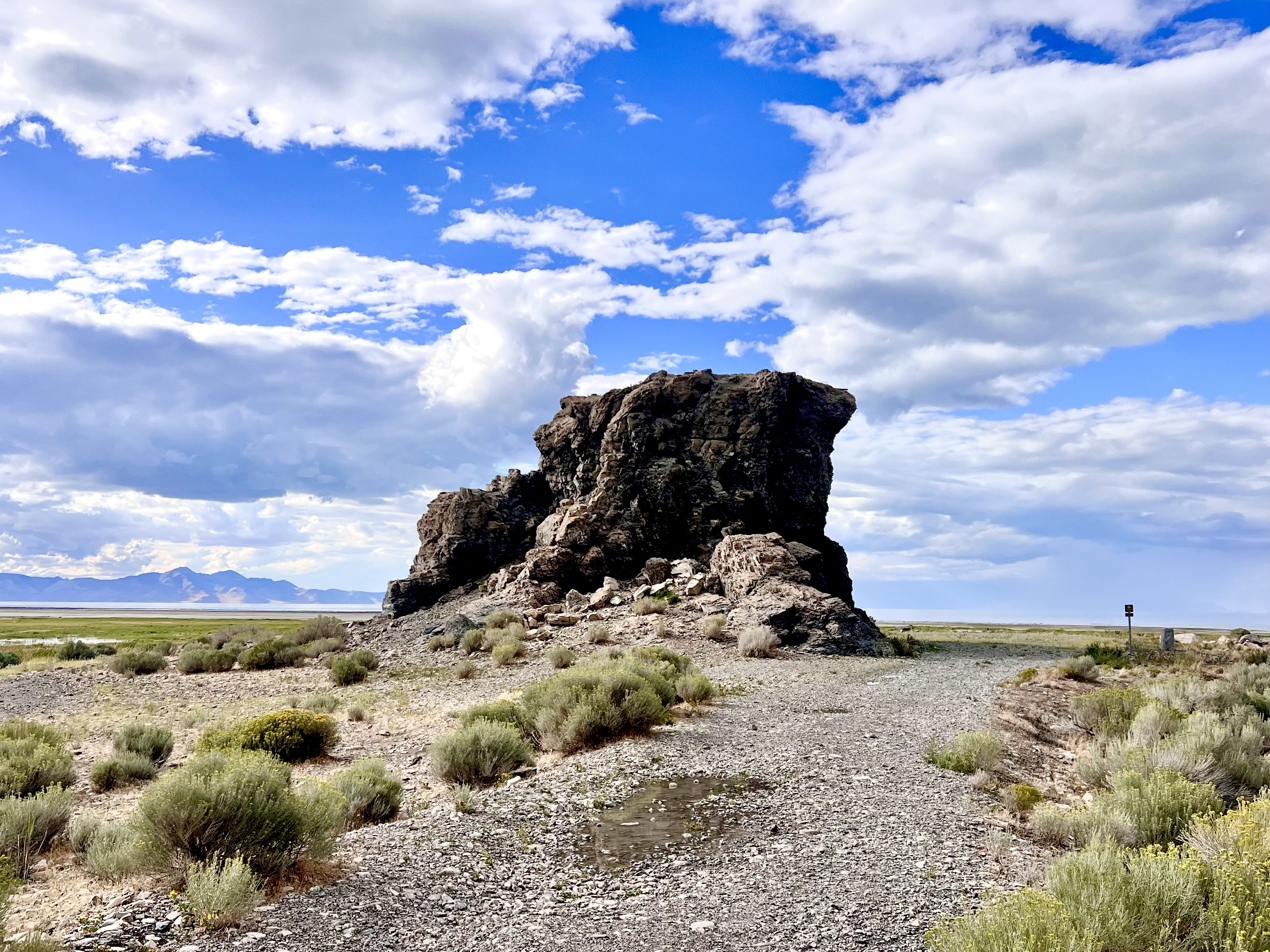
- Looking northwest towards the Great Salt Lake viewing the southern face of Black Rock.

- Location within Utah Location within the United States
- Location: 2.5 miles (4.0 km) west of jct. UT 202 and I 80
- Coordinates: 40.72503°N 112.22774°W
- Area: 6.81 acres (2.76 ha)
- NRHP reference No.: 100006332
- Added to NRHP: March 24, 2021

The Black Rock on Great Salt Lake near Lake Point, Utah is a historic landmark. It was added to the National Register of Historic Places in 2021 as part of the Black Rock Site. The site includes Black Rock and foundation ruins of the former Black Rock Resort.

The site was the location, in 1847, of "the first recreational bathing in the Great Salt Lake in recorded history."

The ill-fated Donner Party, taking the Hastings Cutoff alternative route to California, came by in 1846. Journal entries and interviews describe the Donner Party meeting the "Hastings Trail" on the south side of the Great Salt Lake in August 1846. In later interviews Donner Party member, Reed, was quoted multiple times saying that they had met Lansford Hastings near the landmark (on the eastern border of Lake Point) known as Black Rock and that they were the ones who had given the rock its name.

The rock was described in 1870 by travel guide writer Fitz Ludlow as grim and ugly, yet part of a charming scene:

"A fifteen minute [horse] ride, and Black Rock rose grim and ugly, like the foundation of some ruined tower...we had expected a grim and desolate landscape; a sullen waste of brine, stagnating along low ready shores, black as Acheron, gloomy as the sepulcher of Sodom. Never had Nature a greater surprise for us. The view is one of the most charming which could be imagined." (Ludlow 1870:385)

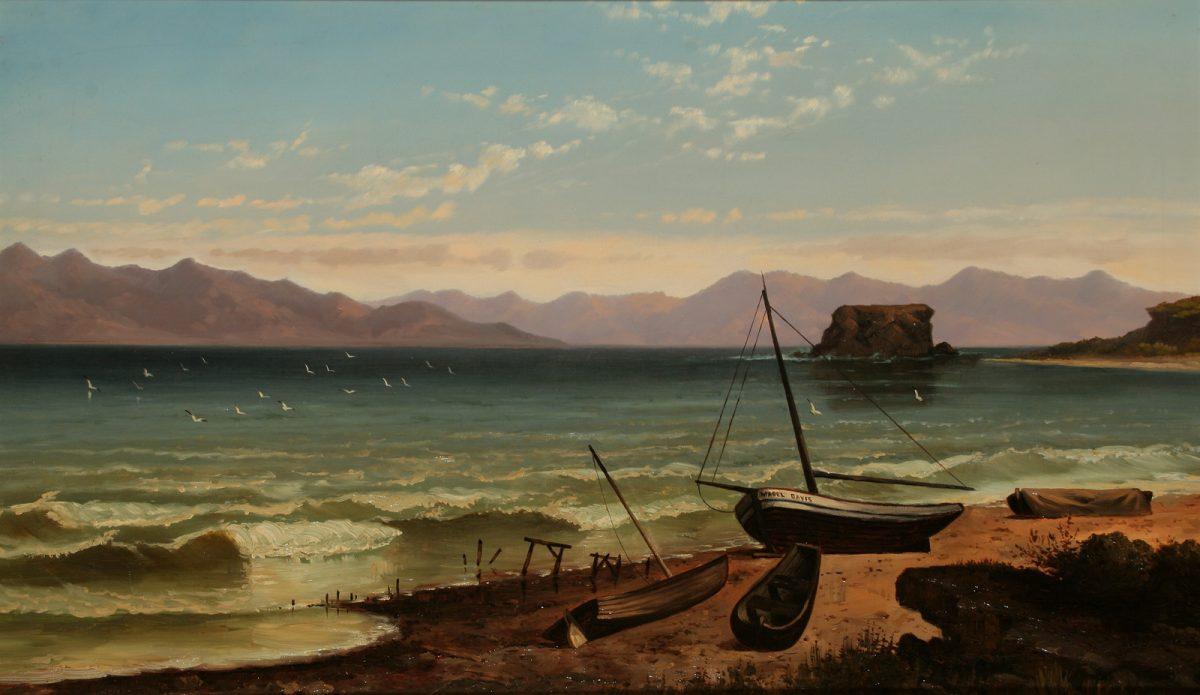
As depicted by Alfred Lambourne

It has been depicted in landscape paintings and lithographs of many artists including Alfred Lambourne, George M. Ottinger, Waldo Midgley, James Taylor Harwood, and Albert Tissandier.

The Black Rock itself measures approximately 39 feet (12 m) tall upon an approximate 130 by 60 feet (40 m × 18 m) base. Over the years, it has been an isolated rock out in the lake, or upon a peninsula into the lake.

While the Black Rock is entirely in Tooele County, the entire site listed is an area about 300 by 800 feet (91 m × 244 m) and spans into Salt Lake County.

== See also ==
- List of individual rocks
- Oquirrh Mountains
- Great Salt Lake
- Antelope Island
- Adobe Rock
- Lake Point, Utah
