= Utah State Route 112 =

State highway in Utah, United States

State Route 112
- SR-112 highlighted in red

Route information
- Maintained by UDOT
- Length: 8.231 mi (13.247 km)
- Existed: 1931–present

Major junctions
- West end: SR-138 in Grantsville
- East end: SR-36 in Tooele

Location
- Country: United States
- State: Utah

Highway system
- Utah State Highway System; Interstate; US; State; Minor; Scenic
← SR-111	→ SR-113

State Route 112 (SR-112) is a state highway in the U.S. state of Utah. It is approximately 8.2 miles (13.2 km) long and connects Tooele and Grantsville in Tooele County. It also provides access to the Tooele Army Depot.

== Route description ==
From its western terminus at SR-138 (Main Street) just east of Grantsville, the route starts out as 800 East, going south and quickly turns to the southeast. It continues in this direction for several miles meeting, and then running along the northeast boundary of the Tooele Army Depot. About 3 miles (4.8 km) from its end, the route turns to the east along 1000 North in Tooele and continues east until its terminus at SR-36 (Main Street).

== History ==
The route was designated on May 12, 1931, as the road from Tooele at SR-36 northwest to Grantsville at then SR-2 (now SR-138). Since that time, the route had undergone only a handful of minor legislative description changes until April 2009, when the eastern end was realigned. The American Recovery and Reinvestment Act of 2009 provided funds for a new construction project on 1000 North in Tooele, which would provide an alternate route from SR-112 to 600 West. As a result, this new construction from SR-112 to SR-36 (Main Street) was designated as part of SR-112, and the stretch of SR-112 from 1000 North southwesterly along Utah Avenue to Main Street was removed from the state highway system and returned to local jurisdiction. Construction of the new eastern portion was accomplished from May 2009 to June 2010.

== Major intersections ==
The entire route is in Tooele County.

Location	mi	km	Destinations	Notes
Grantsville	0.000	0.000	SR-138 (Main Street)	Western terminus
Tooele	5.874	9.453	Utah Avenue	Former SR-112 alignment into Tooele
Tooele	8.231	13.247	SR-36 (Main Street)	Eastern terminus
1.000 mi = 1.609 km; 1.000 km = 0.621 mi
