= Lake Point, Utah =

City in Utah, United States

Lake Point
- City
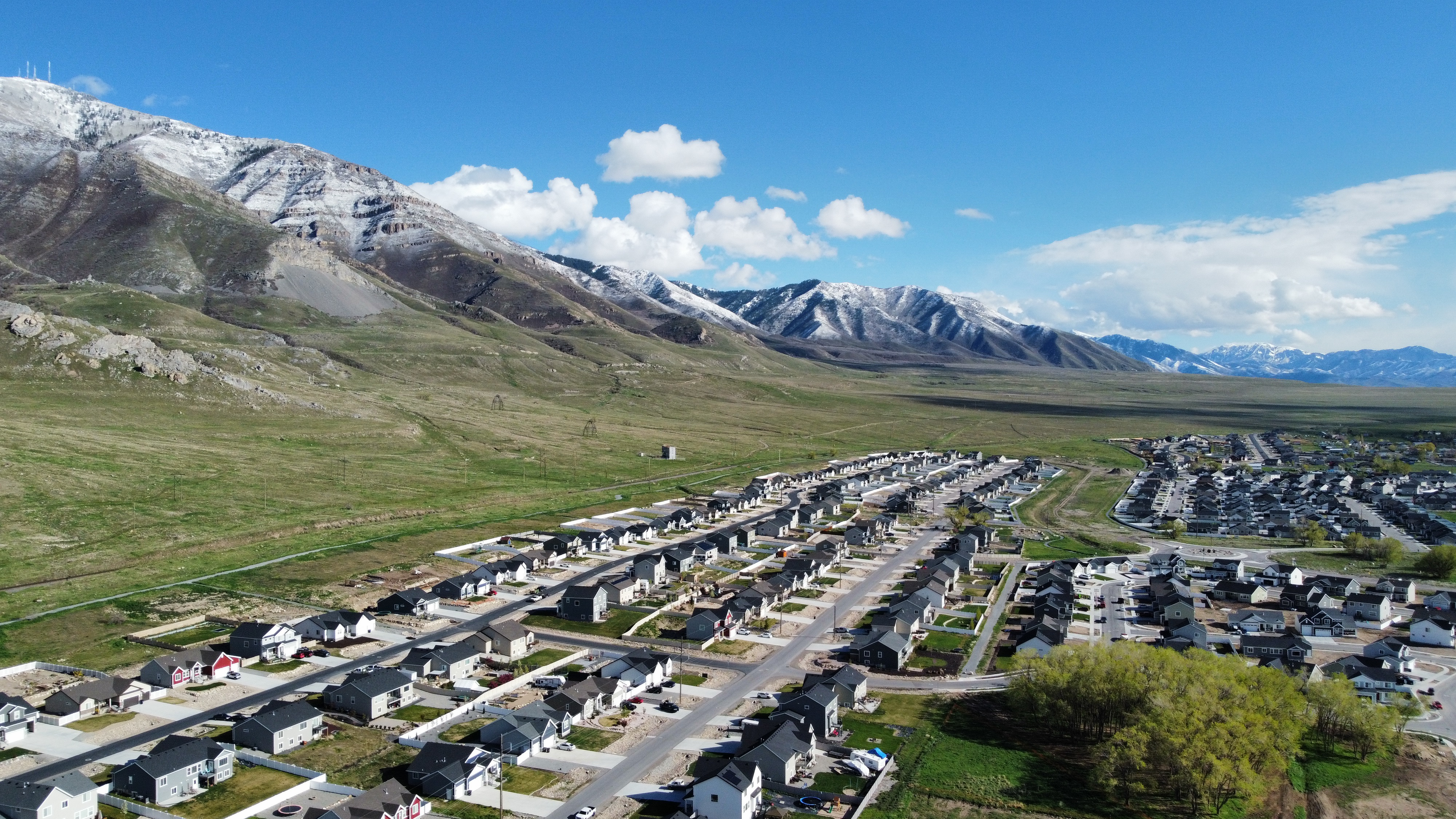

- Interactive map of Lake Point
- Location within Utah Location within the United States
- Coordinates: 40°40′55″N 112°15′47″W
- Country: United States
- State: Utah
- County: Tooele County
- Settled: 1854
- Incorporated: 2022

Government
  - Type: Five-Member Council

Area
  - Total: 4.6 sq mi (12 km^{2})
- Elevation: 4,246 ft (1,294 m)

Population (2020)
  - Total: 2,599
- Time zone: UTC-7 (Mountain (MST))
  - Summer (DST): UTC-6 (MDT)
- Zip Code: 84074
- Area code: 435
- FIPS code: 49-97053
- GNIS feature ID: 2831206
- Website: https://lakepoint.gov/

Lake Point is a city on the eastern edge of northern Tooele County, Utah, United States.

The community was originally settled in 1854 under the name of E.T. City, in honor of Ezra T. Benson. It was renamed Lake Point in 1923.

A 2021 feasibility study for the proposed Lake Point incorporation area indicated an estimated population of 2,599. During the 2021 United States elections, the residents of Lake Point voted to become a city with a five-member council; the first city council was then elected the following year.

== History ==
=== Military cartographers and early pioneers ===
John C. Frémont, a second lieutenant in the U.S. Army Corps of Topographical Engineers, was commissioned by the US Government to explore the Mexican territory west of the Louisiana Purchase with a special interest in the terrain and various routes that could link the Midwest to California. In the summer of 1843 Fremont took a smaller team from his men and veered off the Oregon Trail at Fort Hall to the Bear River into its terminus at the Great Salt Lake. He explored the lake on an eighteen-foot inflatable rubber boat loaded with provisions and produced a map of the lake and its surroundings.

From 1843-1846 Fremont made several expeditions which included a route south of the Great Salt Lake and eastward to the Humboldt River in Nevada. In January 1846, Fremont met with Lansford Hastings, another explorer military man who shared a passion for driving settlement in California. A year earlier, in 1845, Hastings published a popular book called "The Emigrants' Guide to Oregon and California" which contained a passage that said the quickest route to the San Francisco Bay was a diversion from Fort Hall on the Oregon Trail "...bearing West Southwest, to the Salt Lake". Fremont's detailed explanations of his most recent expedition south of the Great Salt Lake was received with much enthusiasm by Hastings. In 1846 Fremont would continue to publish details of his explorations through Utah and Nevada and Hastings set out with teams of men in recruiting settlers to use the Hastings Cutoff.

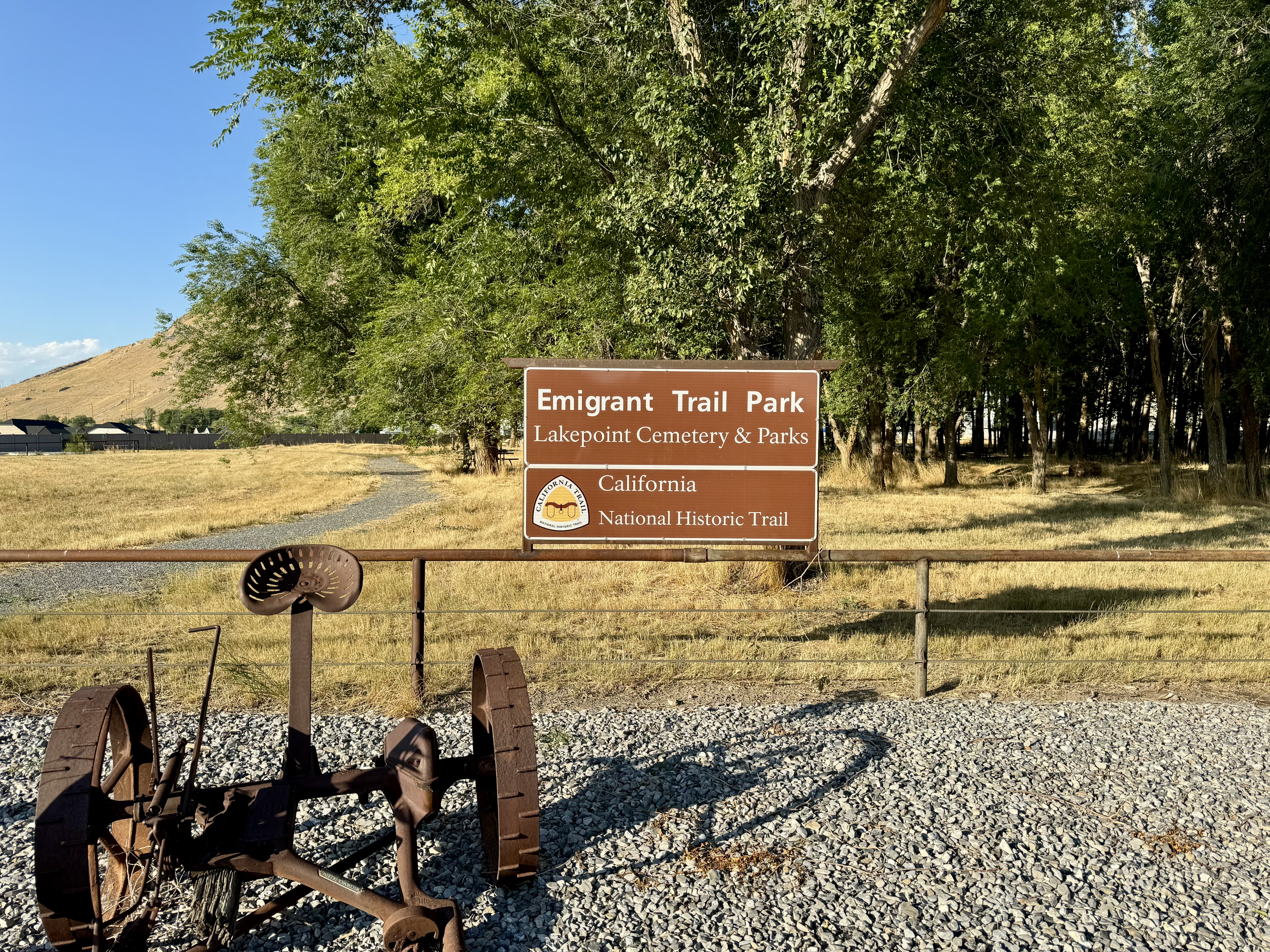
Emigrant Trail Park in Lake Point, Utah

The Donner Party were numbered among these same initial pioneers on the Hastings Cutoff, but were slowed down for a variety of reasons including road building activities. Journal entries and interviews describe the Donner Party meeting the "Hastings Trail" on the south side of the Great Salt Lake in August 1846. In later interviews Donner Party member, Reed, was quoted multiple times saying that they had met Lansford Hastings near the landmark (on the eastern border of Lake Point) known as Black Rock and that they were the ones who had given the rock its name.

Brigham Young had studied the published maps and articles written by John Fremont which greatly influenced his route and destination for a new Mormon settlement. The Brigham Young led the first Mormon pioneers into the Salt Lake Valley almost a year after the Donner Party first arrived. On July 27, 1847, just 3 days later, Brigham Young and 16 other men set out to examine the Hasting Cutoff trail along the south side of the lake and to evaluate the water, soil, timber, and other natural resources of Tooele Valley. No bold plans for the valley materialized in that expedition but it was concluded that there was potential for pastorage.

Similar to John Fremont, the U.S. Army Corps of Topographical Engineers ordered Captain Howard Stansbury to take his team to the Salt Lake Valley to gain better understanding of the land around the Great Salt Lake for purposes of supply and travel routes, and to document resources, indigenous peoples, and Mormon settlements. In November 1849, Stansbury and his team had made a trip around the Great Salt Lake and came into the Tooele Valley. Their team had cattle and constructed an adobe structure for those watching the herd. The structure made an impression because it was one of the first known buildings in the valley. The location made an impression as well because it was adjacent to a large rock tower that had already served as a landmark for travelers. The rock tower became known as Adobe Rock.

=== E.T. City ===
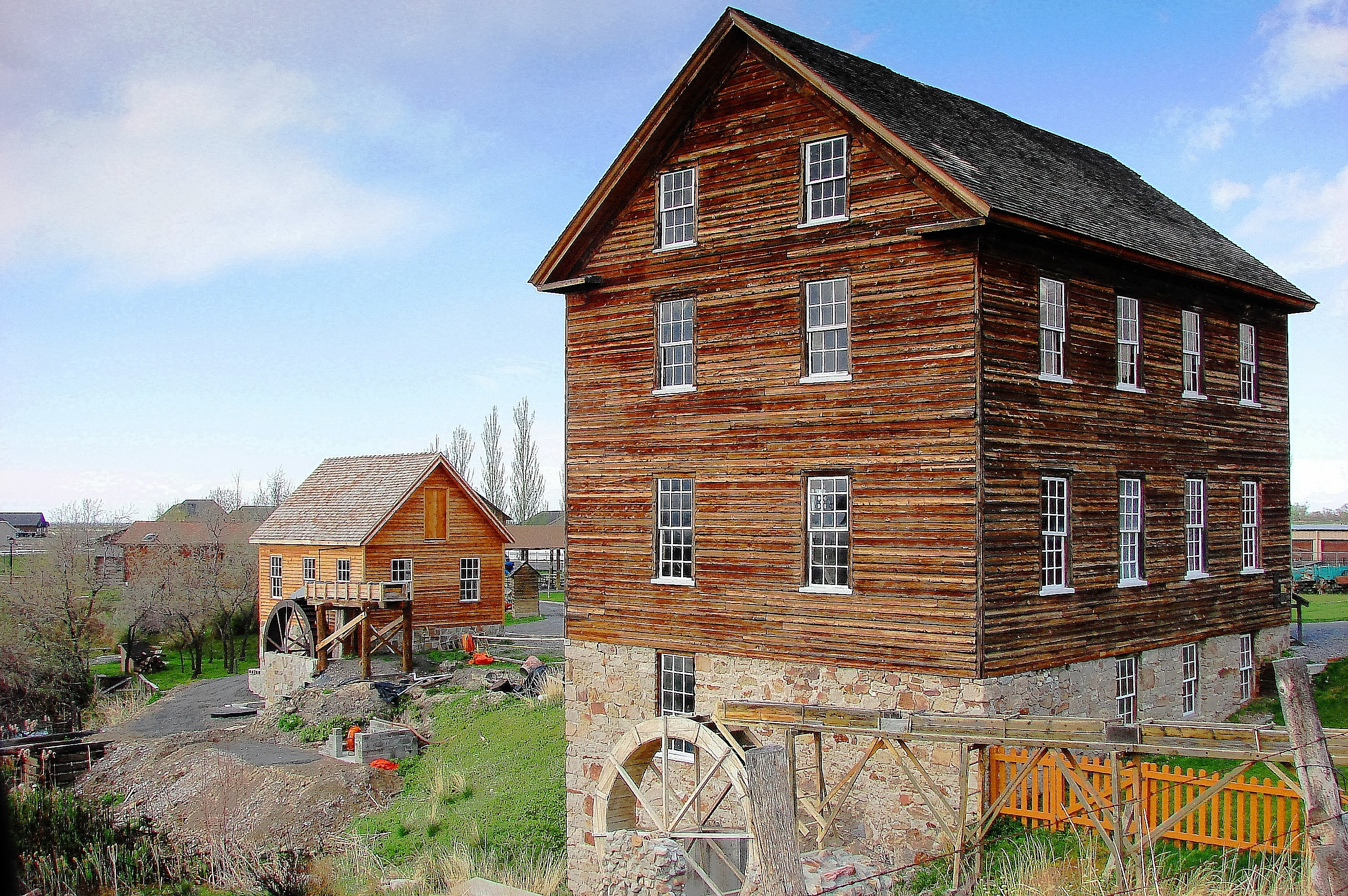
Benson Grist Mill

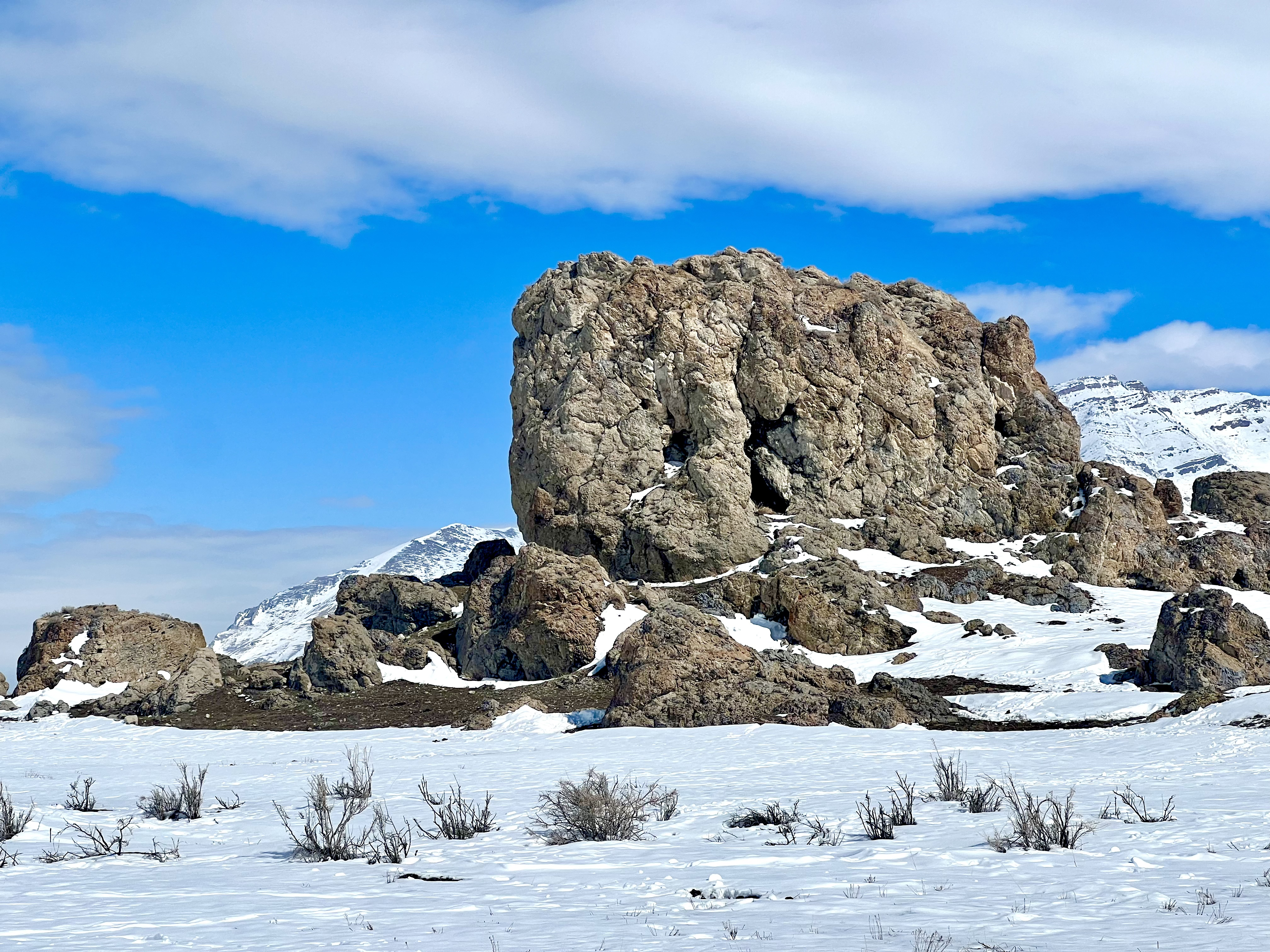
Adobe Rock

Pioneers of the Church of Jesus Christ of Latter-day Saints arrived in Lake Point on July 27, 1847. The team of men included Brigham Young and Orson Pratt. Pratt wrote in his journal that "We continued on about 4 miles further [beyond Black Rock], when we reached a valley putting up to the southward from the lake." Very little happened for two years from that initial visitation. Mormon settlers did travel the area and perhaps dwelled in an official capacity, but the Tooele Valley wasn't formally organized as a colony for members of the Church until Apostle Ezra T. Benson hired men to build mills and watch his cattle in the valley. Cyrus and Juda Tolman along with Phineas R. Wright were brought in to build sawmills and a grist mill. And John Rowberry and Robert Skelton followed shortly after in December 1849 to winter Benson's cattle. When the 1850 census was taken a year and a half later, all 5 men and their families were accounted for as living in Settlement Canyon in what is now Tooele City.

On April 24, 1850 Ezra T. Benson visited the new settlement and organized the first LDS branch with Rowberry as Bishop. By late Spring and Summer of that year more Mormon settlers came into the valley including Peter Maughan and his family. Tooele County was organized in April 1851 with Peter Maughan appointed to the position of County Clerk. In 1852 Settlement Canyon Fort, which included Peter Maughan's home, was disassembled and moved closer to present day city center in Tooele. In November 1853, Maughan, Rowberry, and Bates were appointed a committee to both "...locate E.T. City and for building a dam at Rock Springs [Adobe Springs Creek]." In 1854 $700 was expended to build the dam, which failed because the water seeped through an underground passage so that water would not rise. The committee then had to spend an additional $300 to bring water from Twin Springs to the location of the new settlement; Twin Springs was the same source of water for the Benson Grist Mill which was completed that same year. In August 1854 the Maughan house was disassembled and moved for a second time, now to the location that was selected for E.T. City. There were others who joined him who built small houses along the north-south road. In October 1854, Maughan was appointed as the Presiding Elder over E.T. City. According to the Utah Centennial County History Series, E.T. City was a precinct named after Ezra Taft Benson that extended from the Benson Grist Mill to E.T. Hill (Adobe Rock), and all the way over to Black Rock (Great Salt Lake). This was formalized in 1855 by Ezra Taft Benson who represented Tooele County in the Utah Territorial Legislature.

The first year of farming in E.T. City in 1855, the crops showed great promise of reaching maturity until they were destroyed by a massive swarm of grasshoppers. In 1856 the watering of their crops brought out saleratus in the soil that destroyed most of that year's harvest. Upon hearing the plight of the people in the new settlement, Brigham Young permitted a committee of 6 men led by Maughan to explore Cache Valley for a new location. They departed on July 21, 1856 and returned home safely. In late August, Brigham Young allowed for any man and his family to leave E.T. City to go with Peter Maughan to settle in Cache Valley. Some were glad to do so. They arrived at their new location in September of that same year and built Maughan's Fort which became Wellsville, Utah. In 1860, Ezra T. Benson joined Maughan to direct religious affairs and assist in settling the Cache Valley area.

=== Tourism and The Utah Western Railway ===
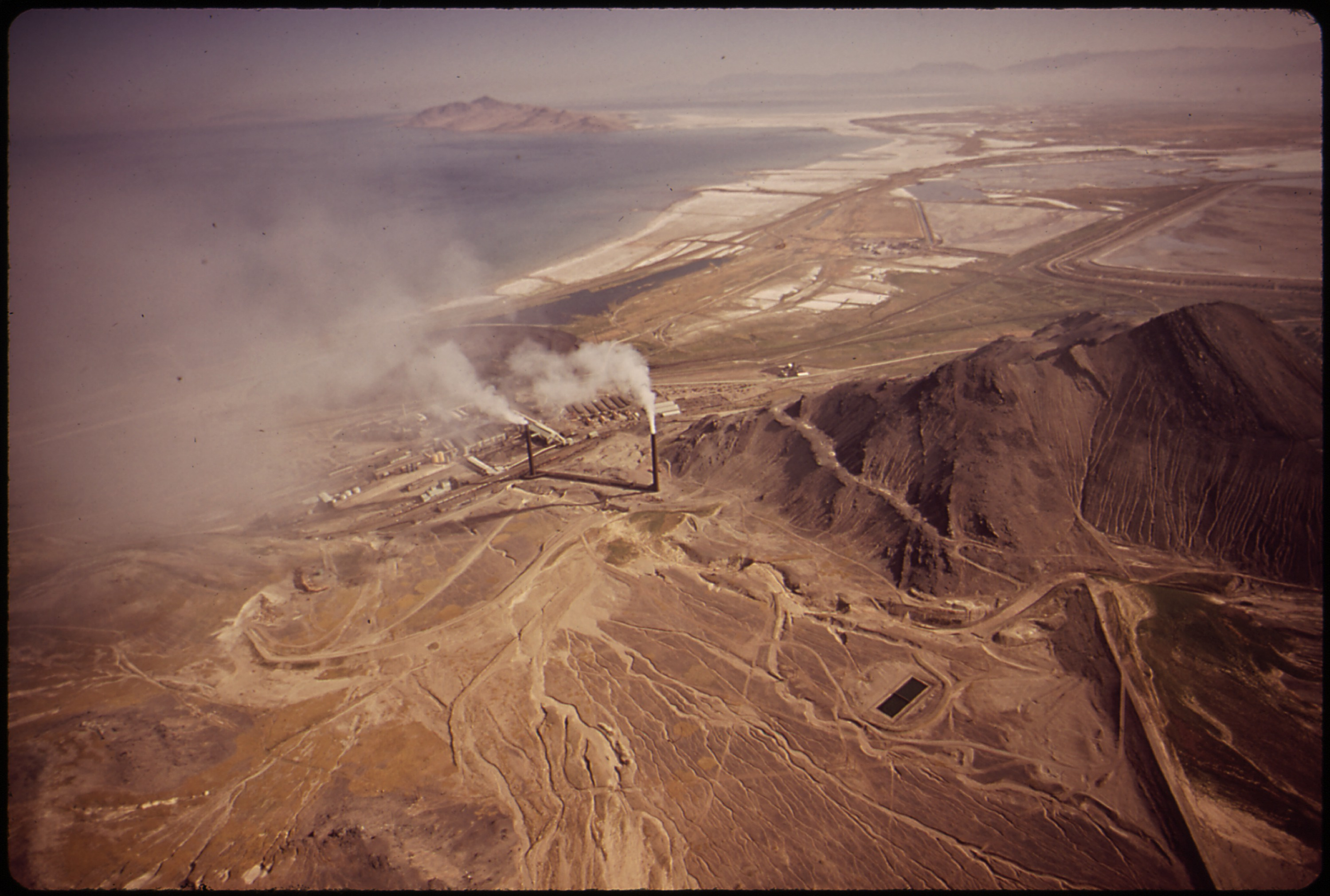
Kennecott Copper Smelter

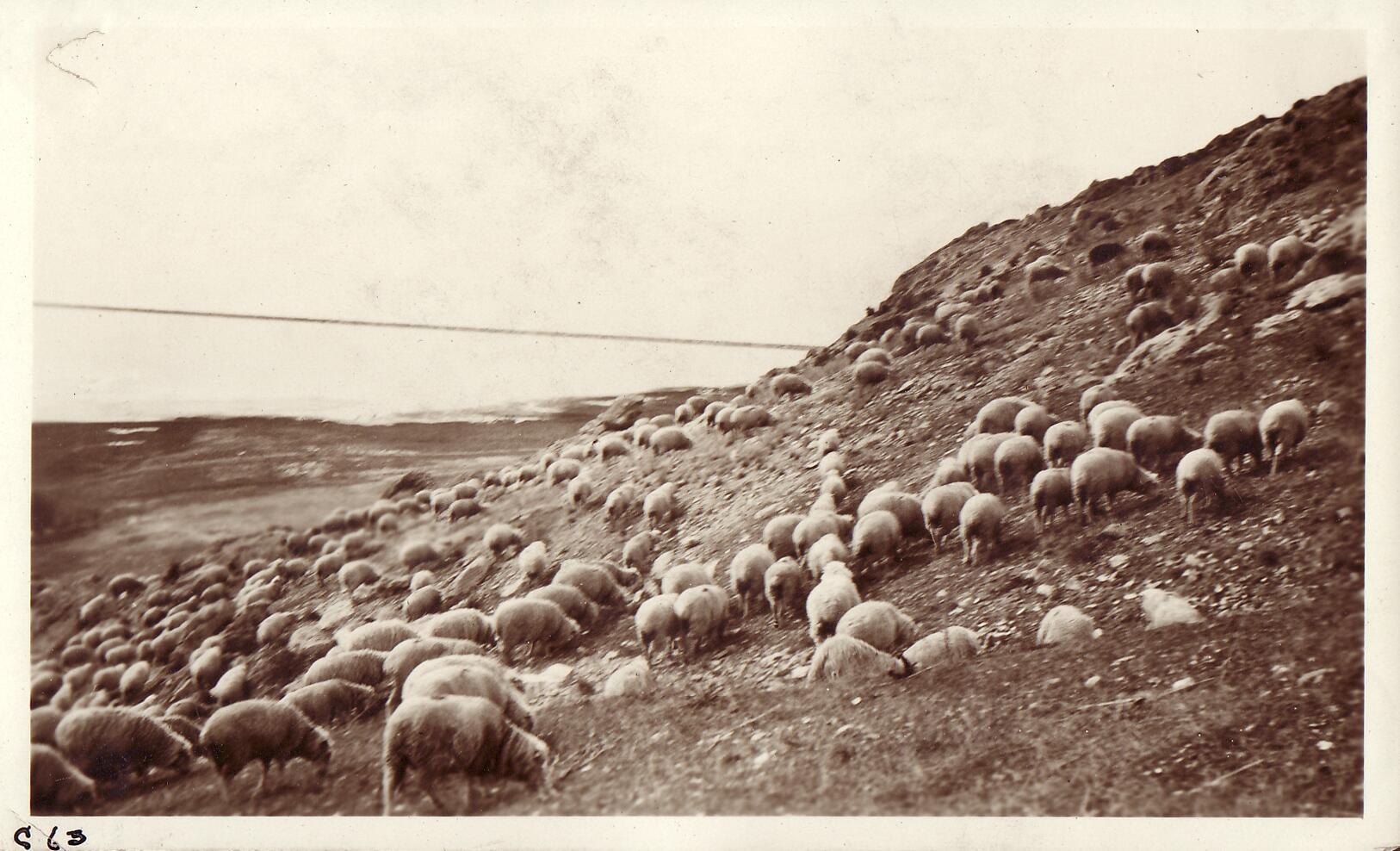
Sheep Herding in Lake Point, Utah

Less than a year later, in the spring of 1871, Jeter Clinton's Lake House was built at a location called Clinton's Landing in Lake Point. From Young's Lake Side resort one could pay 25-cents "to ride on the City of Corinne, a steamboat, going to Lake Point on the south shore". Within 4 years, and two railroad companies later, John W. Young became president of the newly formed Utah Western Railway and Heber P. Kimball treasurer and superintendent of construction. On February 7, 1875 they connected Salt Lake City to a train stop called Lake Point, adjacent to this station was Clinton’s new three story Lake Point Hotel with bath houses and a dock prepared to receive the City of Corinne Steamboat. In 1877 John Muir wrote, "Lake Point is only an hour or two from the city, and has hotel accommodations and a steamboat for excursions; and then, besides the bracing waters, the climate is delightful...The crystal brightness of the water, the wild flowers, and the lovely mountain scenery make this a favorite summer resort for pleasure and health seekers. Numerous excursion trains are run from the city, and parties, some of them numbering upwards of a thousand, come to bathe, and dance, and roam the flowery hillsides together".

Early railroading was very difficult with many smaller railroads ultimately folding and becoming part of larger railroad companies. On September 16, 1877 the Utah Western Railway completed its initial buildout to receive freight from Stockton, Utah, but the company was losing money.

The acquired Clinton land and the buffalo were part of a real estate scheme to sell subdivided cottage lots with beautiful planted trees, gardens, and culinary water wells with the tourist attraction of a Buffalo Park. The venture was unsuccessful and on February 18, 1893, Glasmann’s Buffalo Park Land Company sold its seventeen American bison to John E. Dooley. The bison were herded around the lake up to Farmington and loaded on a flat boat to become the nucleus of the buffalo herd on nearby Antelope Island.

=== A Highway Town and Extraction Economy ===
In late June 1892, Mary Ann Maughan, the wife of the now late Peter Maughan, wrote in her diary about a trip that took her to various places to visit friends and graves. She described visiting the Garfield Resort, seeing the buffalo herd at Buffalo Park, and noted that "...the place where E.T. City once stood there are only a few houses there now". The community had changed a lot since she and her husband left to help settle Cache Valley. The necessity of keeping a settlement close together for fortification purposes became less important as the threat from the Goshute tribe was neutralized, and E.T. City had diffused well beyond the E.T. Canal into larger owned properties spread out along several branching roads. In some cases, all that remained of the older cabins were remnants of rock chimneys.

== Geography ==
It is located 17 miles (27 km) southwest of Salt Lake City International Airport and 11 miles (18 km) north of Tooele, Utah. At its location on the south shore of the Great Salt Lake, the city is served by Interstate 80 and Utah State Route 36.

== Demographics ==
Historical population
Census	Pop.	Note	%±
1860	141		—
1870	114		−19.1%
1880	177		55.3%
1890	206		16.4%
1900	192		−6.8%
1910	179		−6.8%
1920	196		9.5%
1930	299		52.6%
1940	231		−22.7%
1950	190		−17.7%
Source: U.S. Census Bureau

== See also ==
- Oquirrh Mountains
- Farnsworth Peak
- Black Rock (Great Salt Lake)
- Adobe Rock
- Benson Grist Mill
- Stansbury Park
