= Stansbury Park, Utah =

- CDP and Township
- Location in Tooele County and the state of Utah

- Location of Utah in the United States
- Coordinates: 40°37′48″N 112°18′16″W
- Country: United States
- State: Utah
- County: Tooele
- Established: 1970
- Named for: Howard Stansbury

Government
  - Type: Unincorporated area

Area
  - Total: 1.5 sq mi (3.8 km^{2})
  - Land: 1.3 sq mi (3.4 km^{2})
  - Water: 0.19 sq mi (0.5 km^{2})
- Elevation: 4,278 ft (1,304 m)

Population (2020)
  - Total: 9,851
- Time zone: UTC-7 (Mountain (MST))
  - Summer (DST): UTC-6 (MDT)
- ZIP code: 84074
- Area code: 435
- FIPS code: 49-72720
- GNIS feature ID: 2409995
- Website: Official Service Agency Website; Official Stansbury Park Community Association Website

Stansbury Park is a census-designated place (CDP) in Tooele County, Utah, United States. As of the 2020 United States Census, the population was 9,851, up from the 2010 figure of 5,145.

Stansbury Park is located in the northern end of Tooele Valley at the base of the Oquirrh Mountains. Traveling by Interstate 80, Stansbury Park is 35 minutes from downtown Salt Lake City.

Stansbury Park was proposed by the original developer (Terracor) as a planned community with a lake for sailing and canoeing, an eighteen-hole golf course, clubhouse, swimming pool, and parks. Although the original developer withdrew from the scene in the 1980s due to bankruptcy, that plan has generally been followed. The parks throughout Stansbury Park include baseball diamonds, soccer fields, basketball courts, tennis courts, play areas for children, skateboard park, and an astronomical observatory. A large park northwest of Utah State Route 138 is being developed. A natural lake (The Mill Pond) exists on the northern edge of the area; it is fed by a spring at its southeast end. The outflow water from this lake is piped around the Oquirrh Mountain Range (east of Stansbury Park) to the Kennecott Company's copper mine refinery operation (the runoff water from the lake enters a large pipe NW of the Benson Grist Mill for transport to the Kennecott operation).

The area includes several businesses, clustered in two developments at the southeast and northeast corners of the area along Utah State Route 36.

As of 2019, the community is not incorporated; thus all municipal services (except for water and sewer service) are provided by Tooele County. A proposal to incorporate was voted down in November 2016.

== Recreation ==
The 18-hole public golf course runs through the center of Stansbury Park. It contains 14 lakes. All the par 3 holes are over water and 16 of the holes have water hazards. During the winter, Stansbury Park is often the only course open in the greater Salt Lake City area. The course has a clubhouse with food service, a pro shop, putting green and driving range.

The Harmon's astronomical observatory, the Stansbury Park Observing Complex, is at the north end near the skateboard park. The observatory boasts a 40 cm (16") Ealing reflector, an 81 cm (32") reflector and a 200 mm (8") refractor along with computerized tracking and CCD imaging capabilities. The facility is owned and operated by the Salt Lake Astronomical Society. In 2017 another building was erected north of the original complex buildings, to house the world's largest amateur-built reflector telescope.

== Schools ==
Stansbury Park has six public-education schools and one charter school. There are four public elementary schools (K through 6th grades), one junior high, and one high school. Stansbury Elementary opened in 1979, Rose Springs Elementary opened in 2005, and Old Mill opened in 2017. Stansbury Junior High (7-8 grade) opened in 2025. Stansbury High School (9th through 12th), just southwest of Rose Springs Elementary School, opened in August 2009. Bonneville Academy, on the west edge of Stansbury Park, is a K-8 Charter school with a focus on STEM education. In 2023, An 8-year-old boy called Dallin Cunningham died at Rose Springs Elementary School, after falling off a slide in the school's playground. In 2024, Dallin's parents, Timothy and Kathryn Cunningham, sued the local school district over the death of their 8-year-old son.

== Churches ==
As of 2009, there were five church buildings in Stansbury Park, all units of the Church of Jesus Christ of Latter-day Saints (LDS Church). An LDS meetinghouse northwest of the Benson Grist Mill was placed into service in early 2009; that area was not part of the original Stansbury Park proposal, but since its water and sewer are provided by the Stansbury Park Improvement District, it is now considered an integral part of the development.

== Miscellaneous ==
Stansbury Park receives mail service from the Tooele Post Office, ZIP 84074.

Drinking water for Stansbury Park comes from deep wells about two miles southeast of the park, east of Utah State Route 36. Originally, the golf course was watered from another deep well within the Park boundary at the southeast corner, but that water had such a high level of hardness that it was abandoned in 1985 and the potable-water well is now also used to serve the golf course. Sewer service is provided by a lagoon complex northwest of the community (north of Utah State Route 138). These services are administered by the Stansbury Park Improvement District.

The golf course, swimming pool, and common areas within Stansbury Park were originally administered by two separate service districts (Stansbury Greenbelt Service Area #1 and SGSA #2), but since August 1992 have been administered by a combined district, the Stansbury Service Agency, whose volunteer, unpaid board members are elected by the population.

Woodland Park, near the southeast end of Stansbury Park, contains trees which existed before the development started. The park area was the site of a large horse stable complex before and during the first part of the area's present development. It presently contains a children's playground and a basketball court.

Benson Grist Mill, north of the original area of Stansbury Park, is a restoration of an actual nineteenth-century water-powered (powered by waterflow from The Mill Pond) wheat-grinding mill built on that site, and has grown into a recreational and historical interest area.

Stansbury Lake, southwest of The Mill Pond, is a manmade lake. A peninsula which extends into the lake, called Captain's Island, contains 178 houses, and there are another 143 houses along the lake's shores. The lake is noted for its boating (non-motor-powered boats only, although electric motors are now allowed), swimming, and fishing. Resident fish include bluegill, smallmouth bass, largemouth bass, grass carp, and yellow perch. Black crappie were planted at one time but have apparently not continued. Carp have been introduced at times in attempts to control weed growth in the lake.

The original addressing scheme for Stansbury Park was to divide the area into neighborhoods, each with a name and with the houses therein to be numbered from 1 to XXX. The three original neighborhoods were Country Club, Lake View, and Mill Pond (which consisted of blocks of condominiums rather than individual houses). This addressing system is confusing to resident and outsider alike, and areas developed since 1990 have abandoned that concept, instead using individual street names and house numbers which integrate into the Tooele City numbering system (although the starting point of Tooele City's numbering system is some seven miles distant).

Stansbury Park has an active community association, originally named the Stansbury Park Homeowners Association, but now named the Stansbury Park Community Association. This organization grants preliminary approval to housing and remodeling plans within the service area (Tooele County Engineering Department grants final approval), and organizes outdoor activities such as Stansbury Days every third Saturday in August, Easter Egg hunts, gardening classes and other local celebrations such as fireworks displays on holidays. In its early days it published an annual telephone/address directory covering the area.

== Geography ==
Stansbury Park is located on State Route 36, approximately 6 miles (9.7 km) north of the city of Tooele.

According to the United States Census Bureau, the CDP has a total area of 1.5 square miles (3.9 km^{2}), of which 1.3 square miles (3.4 km^{2}) is land and 0.2 square miles (0.52 km^{2}) (12.84%) is water.

Stansbury Park is approximately 23 miles (30 minutes) from the Salt Lake International Airport

== Demographics ==
Historical population
| Census | Pop. | Note | %± |
|---|---|---|---|
| 1980 | 300 | | — |
| 1990 | 1,049 | | 249.7% |
| 2000 | 2,385 | | 127.4% |
| 2010 | 5,145 | | 115.7% |
| 2020 | 9,851 | | 91.5% |
source: US Decennial Census

As of the census of 2000, there were 2,385 people, 701 households, and 625 families residing in the CDP. The population density was 1,842.7 people per square mile (711.5 people/km^{2}). There were 718 housing units at an average density of 554.7 per square mile (214.2/km^{2}). The racial makeup of the CDP was 95.60% White, 0.50% African American, 0.71% Native American, 0.59% Asian, 0.04% Pacific Islander, 1.34% from other races, and 1.22% from two or more races. Hispanic or Latino of any race were 4.53% of the population.

There were 701 households, out of which 55.8% had children under the age of 18 living with them, 83.5% were married couples living together, 4.4% had a female householder with no husband present, and 10.8% were non-families. 9.0% of all households were made up of individuals, and 1.4% had someone living alone who was 65 years of age or older. The average household size was 3.40 and the average family size was 3.64.

In the CDP, the population was spread out, with 37.7% under the age of 18, 6.8% from 18 to 24, 34.1% from 25 to 44, 18.5% from 45 to 64, and 2.9% who were 65 years of age or older. The median age was 30 years. For every 100 females, there were 99.4 males. For every 100 females age 18 and over, there were 98.9 males.

The median income for a household in the CDP was $66,295, and the median income for a family was $67,930. Males had a median income of $47,008 versus $31,477 for females. The per capita income for the CDP was $20,347. None of the families and 0.3% of the population were living below the poverty line, including no under eighteens and none of those over 64.

== See also ==
- List of census-designated places in Utah
- Lake Point, Utah
