= Utah State Route 138 =

State highway in Utah, United States

State Route 138
- SR 138 highlighted in red

Route information
- Maintained by UDOT
- Length: 16.300 mi (26.232 km)
- Existed: 1970–present

Major junctions
- West end: I-80 near Grantsville (exit 84)
- SR-112 in Grantsville
- East end: SR-179 near Grantsville

Location
- Country: United States
- State: Utah

Highway system
- Utah State Highway System; Interstate; US; State; Minor; Scenic
← SR-137	→ SR-139

State Route 138 is a highway, completely within Tooele County in northern Utah that connects I-80 at exit 84 through Grantsville to where Parachute Lane meets the Tooele Midvalley Highway (SR-179) looping back onto I-80.

== Route description ==
From its western terminus at exit 84 of I-80, northeast of the Stansbury Mountains, the route heads southwest (toward the mountain range), reaching the mining operation of Flux, then turns southeasterly. Upon entering the western side of Grantsville, the highway heads east (serving as Grantsville's Main Street) and turns to the northeast after leaving the city. It runs northeasterly until terminating where Parachute Lane meets the Tooele Midvalley Highway (SR-179). The route runs about sixteen miles (26 km) with an additional four miles (6.4 km) on the Midvalley Highway back to I-80.

With the exception of the segment between SR-112 and Sheep Lane, the route is included in the National Highway System.

== History ==
=== Previous route 1938-1952 ===
The State Road Commission of Utah first printed the designation of SR-138 in 1938 on a route connecting Grantsville north to Burmester, known today as Burmester Road. This first iteration of SR-138 was deleted from further state maps with the 1953 edition.

=== Previous route 1970-2020 ===
In the 1970 edition of the Utah Official Highway Map, I-80 appeared for the first time as a new route in Tooele County that bypassed a major section of existing state highway once dually designated as U.S. Route 50 Alternate and U.S. Route 40 but redesignated under the reprised name of SR-138. This was part of a broader highway naming reconfiguration that extended SR-36 beyond Mills Junction to Lake Point exit 99 on I-80. This version of SR-138, which connected to SR-36 at Mills Junction through Stansbury Park into Grantsville to exit 84 on I-80, remained the same for 50 years.

In the May 2018 meeting of the Utah Transportation Commission, a motion passed to truncate the east end SR-138 to the future Tooele Midvalley Highway (SR-179). This was formalized with the completion of the segment of SR-179 between SR-138 and I-80 in 2021. The section of highway removed from SR-138 east of SR-179 has been renamed Pole Canyon Road which starts from Parachute Lane in Stansbury Park and terminates at Center Street in Lake Point, Utah.

== Major intersections ==
The entire route is in Tooele County.

Location	mi	km	Destinations	Notes
	0.000– 0.505	0.000– 0.813	I-80 – Wendover, Salt Lake City	Western terminus; I-80 exit 84
Grantsville	12.209	19.648	SR-112 south (800 East)	Western terminus of SR-112
			SR-179	Eastern terminus
1.000 mi = 1.609 km; 1.000 km = 0.621 mi
