= List of tallest lake islands =

The following table includes the 30 tallest world islands located in a lake or reservoir. These lake islands are ranked by their topographic prominence, their maximum elevation above the surrounding water level.

All geographic coordinates are adjusted to the World Geodetic System of 1984 (WGS 84). North American topographic elevations are adjusted to the North American Vertical Datum of 1988 (NAVD 88). Use the OpenStreetMap link below to view the location of the high points of these tallest lake islands.

== Tallest lake islands ==
Rank	Island	High point	Lake	Prominence (Note: Lake and reservoir elevations vary seasonally.)	Peak elevation	Lake elevation	Country or region	High point coordinates
1	Ometepe (Note: Ometepe has the greatest topographic prominence of any lake island on Earth. It is also the only island with an ultra-prominent peak)	Volcán Concepción	Lake Nicaragua	1579 m 5,180 ft	1610 m 5,282 ft	31 m 102 ft	Nicaragua	11.538628°N 85.622161°W
2	Teresa Island	Birch Mountain	Atlin Lake	1393 m 4,570 ft	2062 m 6,765 ft	669 m 2,195 ft	British Columbia Canada	59.431911°N 133.820745°W
3	Goat Island	Goat Island Peak	Powell Lake	1264 m 4,147 ft	1314 m 4,311 ft	50 m 164 ft	British Columbia Canada	50.06455°N 124.396691°W
4	Olkhon Island (Note: Olkhon Island has the greatest topographic prominence of any lake island in Asia.)	Mount Zhima	Lake Baikal	821 m 2,694 ft	1276 m 4,186 ft	455 m 1,493 ft	Russia	53.238289°N 107.711715°E
5	Samosir Island (Note: Samosir Island is an island in a lake (Lake Toba) on an island (Sumatra).)	Samosir	Lake Toba	806 m 2,644 ft	1713 m 5,620 ft	907 m 2,976 ft	Indonesia	2.640618°N 98.831913°E
6	Idjwi Island (Note: Idjwi Island has the greatest topographic prominence of any lake island in Africa.)	Idjwi Island high point	Lake Kivu	776 m 2,546 ft	2238 m 7,343 ft	1462 m 4,797 ft	Democratic Republic of the Congo	2.129311°S 29.075806°E
7	Stansbury Island (Note: Stansbury Island becomes a peninsula when the water level of the Great Salt Lake drops to a low enough level.)	Castle Rock	Great Salt Lake	751 m 2,464 ft	2028 m 6,654 ft	1276.9 m 4,189 ft	Utah United States	40.846833°N 112.499069°W
8	Antelope Island (Note: Antelope Island becomes a peninsula when the water level of the Great Salt Lake drops to a low enough level.)	Frary Peak	Great Salt Lake	735.4 m 2,413 ft	2012.3 m 6,602 ft	1276.9 m 4,189 ft	Utah United States	40.962026°N 112.216054°W
9	René-Levasseur Island	Mont Babel	Manicouagan Reservoir	597 m 1,959 ft	957 m 3,140 ft	360 m 1,181 ft	Quebec Canada	51.448284°N 68.687983°W
10	Isla Zapatera	Sierra Santa Julia	Lake Nicaragua	594 m 1,949 ft	625 m 2,051 ft	31 m 102 ft	Nicaragua	11.738263°N 85.81661°W
11	Talim Island (Note: Talim Island is an island in a lake (Laguna de Bay) on an island (Luzon).)	Mount Tagapo	Laguna de Bay	437 m 1,434 ft	438 m 1,437 ft	1 m 3 ft	Philippines	14.339418°N 121.232569°E
12	Monte Isola (Note: Monte Isola has the greatest topographic prominence of any lake island in Europe.)	Monte Isola	Lake Iseo	415 m 1,362 ft	600 m 1,969 ft	185 m 607 ft	Italy European Union	45.703221°N 10.089634°E
13	St. Ignace Island	Mount Saint Ignace	Lake Superior	381 m 1,251 ft	565 m 1,854 ft	183.7 m 603 ft	Ontario Canada	48.788041°N 87.8532°W
14	Amantaní (Note: Amantaní has the greatest topographic prominence of any lake island in South America.)	Pachamama	Lake Titicaca	318 m 1,043 ft	4130 m 13,550 ft	3812 m 12,507 ft	Peru	15.673368°S 69.716094°W
15	Taal Volcano (Note: Taal Volcano is an island in a lake (Lake Taal) on an island (Luzon).)	Taal Volcano high point	Lake Taal	306 m 1,004 ft	311 m 1,020 ft	5 m 16 ft	Philippines	14.00401°N 120.99133°E
16	Michipicoten Island	The Saddleback	Lake Superior	273 m 897 ft	457 m 1,499 ft	183.7 m 603 ft	Ontario Canada	47.755788°N 85.88235°W
17	Pie Island	Pie Island high point	Lake Superior	271 m 890 ft	455 m 1,493 ft	183.7 m 603 ft	Ontario Canada	48.23527°N 89.160877°W
18	Isla del Sol	Cerro Chequesani	Lake Titicaca	264 m 866 ft	4076 m 13,373 ft	3812 m 12,507 ft	Bolivia	16.024683°S 69.187418°W
19	Isla Taquile	Isla Taquile high point	Lake Titicaca	262 m 860 ft	4074 m 13,366 ft	3812 m 12,507 ft	Peru	15.757252°S 69.687691°W
20	Wild Horse Island	Wild Horse Island high point	Flathead Lake	259 m 850 ft	1141 m 3,743 ft	881.8 m 2,893 ft	Montana United States	47.840502°N 114.204001°W
21	Fremont Island (Note: Fremont Island becomes a peninsula when the water level of the Great Salt Lake drops to a low enough level.)	Castle Rock	Great Salt Lake	246 m 807 ft	1523 m 4,997 ft	1276.9 m 4,189 ft	Utah United States	41.174117°N 112.343272°W
22	Isle Royale	Mount Desor	Lake Superior	241 m 792 ft	425 m 1,394 ft	183.7 m 603 ft	Michigan United States	47.955846°N 89.011794°W
23	Wizard Island	Wizard Island Peak	Crater Lake	233 m 766 ft	2113 m 6,932 ft	1879.6 m 6,167 ft	Oregon United States	42.938341°N 122.146375°W
24	Ukerewe Island	Ukerewe Island high point	Lake Victoria	198 m 650 ft	1332 m 4,370 ft	1134 m 3,720 ft	Tanzania	2.068933°S 32.98262°E
25	Anaho Island	Anaho Island high point	Pyramid Lake	175.9 m 577 ft	1335.0 m 4,380 ft	1159.1 m 3,803 ft	Nevada United States	39.95136°N 119.513925°W
26	Manitoulin Island	Cup and Saucer	Lake Huron	175 m 575 ft	352 m 1,155 ft	176.8 m 580 ft	Ontario Canada	45.850038°N 82.106193°W
27	Carrington Island (Note: Carrington Island becomes a peninsula when the water level of the Great Salt Lake drops to a low enough level.)	Carrington Island high point	Great Salt Lake	164.7 m 540 ft	1441.6 m 4,730 ft	1276.9 m 4,189 ft	Utah United States	41.007494°N 112.570375°W
28	Saint Joseph Island	Saint Joseph Island high point	Lake Huron	163 m 536 ft	340 m 1,115 ft	176.8 m 580 ft	Ontario Canada	46.204675°N 83.953371°W
29	Pigeon Island (Note: Pigeon Island has the greatest topographic prominence of any lake island in Australasia.) (Note: Pigeon Island is an island in a lake (Lake Wakatipu) on an island (South Island).)	Pigeon Island high point	Lake Wakatipu	155 m 509 ft	463 m 1,519 ft	308 m 1,010 ft	New Zealand	44.924339°S 168.396249°E
30	Porcupine Island	Porcu Benchmark	Iliamna Lake	155 m 509 ft	169 m 554 ft	14 m 46 ft	Alaska United States	59.702922°N 154.194021°W

== See also ==
- List of elevation extremes by country
- List of elevation extremes by region
- List of U.S. states and territories by elevation
- Lists of islands
  - List of islands by area
  - List of islands by highest point
  - List of islands by name
  - List of islands by population
- Recursive islands and lakes
- River island
