= Elias Smith (Mormon) =

American journalist (1804–1888)

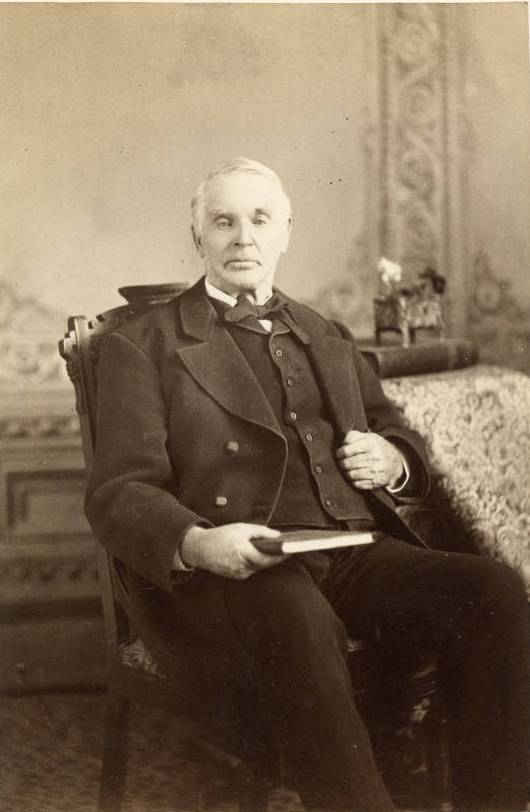
- Elias Smith ca. 1880

Members of the Council of Fifty
- 1844 – June 24, 1888
- Called by: Joseph Smith

Probate judge

In office
- 1851 – 1882

Personal details
- Born: September 6, 1804; Royalton, Vermont, United States
- Died: June 24, 1888 (aged 83); Salt Lake City, Utah, United States
- Resting place: Salt Lake City Cemetery; 40.7772°N 111.8580°W
- Occupation: Business manager
- Employer: Deseret News
- Spouse(s): Lucy Brown; Amy Jane King
- Parents: Asahel Smith; Elizabeth Schellenger

Elias Smith (September 6, 1804 – June 24, 1888) was one of the early leaders in Latter Day Saint movement. Smith was president of the high priests in the church from 1870 to 1877 and president of the high priests quorum in the Salt Lake Stake of the Church of Jesus Christ of Latter-day Saints (LDS Church) from 1877 to 1888.

== Biography ==
Smith was born in Royalton, Vermont, the son of Asael Smith, Jr. and Elizabeth Schellenger. In 1809, his father emigrated to Stockholm, New York, where Elias was raised on a farm with few opportunities for schooling. At the age of twenty-one, he entered public life and held various offices in the town of Stockholm. He also taught school for several terms.

The announcement of a new faith by his cousin, Joseph Smith, drew several members of the Smith family into the new church. George A. Smith was a missionary at the age of sixteen, but his elder cousin Elias was thirty-one years of age when he joined the Latter Day Saints. After the organization of the church, Joseph Smith, Sr., first patriarch of the church, with his son Don Carlos, paid the families of his brothers Asael Jr., Samuel, Silas, and John a visit in August 1830, and brought them a copy of the Book of Mormon. They all expressed interest in the new religion, but none of them were baptized until 1835, except John, who later became patriarch of the LDS Church and was the father of apostle George A. Smith. In 1835, Hyrum Smith and David Whitmer visited the area and the families of Asael Jr. and Silas were baptized, most of them on July 1. However, Elias was not baptized until August 27, 1835, and the next morning he was ordained an elder. In the town and neighborhood of Stockholm, the Smiths established a branch of the church, and in May 1836, the families of Asael Jr. and Silas Smith, with their converts, started for Kirtland, Ohio.

=== Kirtland ===
In 1837 and 1838, Smith taught school at Kirtland. In the latter part of 1837, several of the original Quorum of the Twelve and other prominent men sought to divide the church. Joseph Smith, his brother Hyrum, Sidney Rigdon, Brigham Young, and other leaders fled from Kirtland. A company of over six hundred of the remaining faithful members was organized to follow their leaders to Far West, Missouri. This company, known as Kirtland Camp, was under seven captains, among them was Elias Smith. They left Kirtland early in July 1838 and arrived at Far West on October 2. From Far West they went to Adam-ondi-Ahman, where the company disbanded. Shortly thereafter, the army of Governor Lilburn Boggs marched upon Far West to drive the Mormons en masse out of Missouri. Smith was one of the defenders of Far West who were forced to give up their arms; he was also one of the members of the committee chosen to effect removal of the Latter Day Saints from Missouri to Illinois. He was among the last Mormons to leave Far West.

=== Nauvoo period ===
Smith settled in Nashville, Iowa Territory, across the river from Nauvoo, Illinois. In the organization of the stake in Lee County, Iowa, he was made a member of the stake high council; he was subsequently ordained to act as bishop of the stake, a position he held until the stake was disbanded and he moved to Nauvoo. At Nauvoo, Smith was associated with the press and became the manager of the Times and Seasons and the Nauvoo Neighbor. In 1844, Smith became a member of the Council of Fifty. After the assassination of his cousins Joseph and Hyrum, he followed the leadership of Brigham Young, as did apostle George A. Smith and George's father John, who was made presiding patriarch of the church.

=== Utah ===
Smith left Nauvoo with his family in May 1846, intending to go with the body of the church to the Salt Lake Valley that year. However, he was unable to do so and moved to Iowaville, Iowa, where his mother died in October 1846 and his father in July 1848. In 1851, he emigrated to Utah Territory and soon after was elected by the territorial legislature to be probate judge of Salt Lake County. He continued in this office until 1882. In 1852, Smith was appointed as the chairman of the Code Commission, with Albert Carrington and William Snow as members of the commission. Their duty was to present to the legislature those laws best adapted to the conditions and character of the people.

In addition to his judicial duties, Smith was business manager of the Deseret News under Willard Richards, and was postmaster of Salt Lake City from July 1854 to 1858. In 1856, he became editor of the Deseret News; he held this position until September 1862, when he was succeeded by Albert Carrington. Afterwards, Smith confined himself almost exclusively to his judicial duties. In 1862, he was a member of the Utah Constitutional Convention, and one of the committee members who drafted a constitution for the proposed state.

== Personal life ==
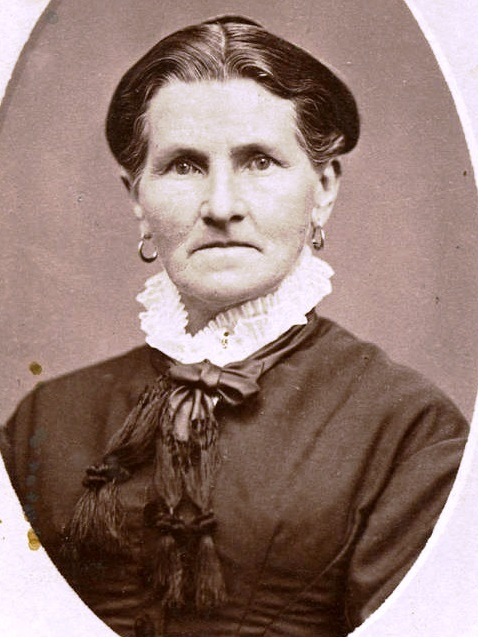
Lucy Brown Smith

Smith was a bachelor until the age of forty-one. He married Lucy Brown at Nauvoo on August 6, 1845. She was born in England on January 4, 1820, joined the Latter Day Saints church in 1842, and arrived in Nauvoo in 1843. They were the parents of Elias A. Smith, who succeeded his father as judge in Salt Lake County. Smith had one plural wife, Amy Jane King, and was the father of sixteen children.

Amy Jane King was born October 3, 1839, in Mantua, Portage County, Ohio. Her parents were Thomas Jefferson King and Rebecca Englesby Olin. They had a very comfortable log home and large farm with a grove of maple trees.

Smith first met Amy Jane King as his 46-year-old teacher in Iowaville, 50 miles west of Nauvoo. During the winter of 1850-51, Amy and her brothers attended the local school. She was 11 years old. After seven years, the Kings emigrated to Utah and were welcomed by Elias and his family on August 9, 1854. The next summer, she worked in his home. On April 15, 1851, Elias married Amy and she moved into his home. She had her first baby the next year. She was a believing member of the faith until she died on November 8, 1913.

Smith died at his home in Salt Lake City.

== See also ==
- Jean Baptiste (grave robber)
