= Howard Stansbury =

United States army major

- Born: February 8, 1806; New York City, US
- Died: April 17, 1863 (aged 57); Madison, Wisconsin, US
- Occupation: Surveyor
- Known for: Surveying the Great Salt Lake

Howard Stansbury (February 8, 1806 – April 17, 1863) was a major in the U.S. Army Corps of Topographical Engineers. One of his most notable achievements was leading a two-year expedition (1849–1851) to survey the Great Salt Lake and its surroundings. The expedition report entitled Exploration and survey of the valley of the Great Salt Lake of Utah, including a reconnaissance of a new route through the Rocky Mountains was published in 1852 providing the first serious scientific exploration of the flora and fauna of the Great Salt Lake Valley as well as a favorable impression of the members of the Church of Jesus Christ of Latter-day Saints, who had settled there beginning in 1847.

== Career ==
Stansbury was born in 1806 in New York City. He was trained as a civil engineer and joined the Topographical Bureau in 1828. In the service of the bureau, he surveyed the James River in 1836, and the Illinois and Kaskaskia Rivers in 1837. In 1838 he oversaw the construction of a road from Milwaukee to the Mississippi River. In July 1838 he joined the new U.S. Corps of Topographical Engineers as a first lieutenant. As a member of the corps, he surveyed the Great Lakes in 1841 and conducted an extensive survey of the Portsmouth, New Hampshire harbor between 1842 and 1845. In 1848 he oversaw the start of construction of the Carysfort Reef Light in Florida. During the Mexican–American War he oversaw the building of fortifications in the Dry Tortugas in the Gulf of Mexico.

== Stansbury Expedition ==
In 1849 Stansbury was ordered to travel from Fort Leavenworth, Kansas to survey the Great Salt Lake in Utah, to evaluate emigration trails along the way (especially the Oregon and Mormon trails), and to scout for possible locations for a transcontinental railroad. The expedition consisted of 18 men, including second-in-command Lieutenant John Williams Gunnison. During the next two years, the expedition explored the Great Salt Lake, Utah Lake and the Cache Valley of northern Utah all the way to Fort Hall in southern Idaho. When he arrived in the Utah Territory, the Mormon leaders were worried that the expedition was part of an effort by the U.S government to oust the settlers. Stansbury held a meeting with Brigham Young where he assured the leader that the expedition was purely scientific. Young responded by assigning his personal secretary, Albert Carrington, to assist the expedition.

In his report, Stansbury wrote:

This pledge thus heartily given was as faithfully redeemed and it gives me pleasure here to acknowledge the warm interest manifested and efficient aid rendered as well by the president as by all the leading men of the community both in our welfare and in the successful prosecution of the work.

In 1850, he advised Brigham Young on the extermination of the Timpanogos, which he said "could not but meet my entire approval" and gave supplies for the Battle at Fort Utah. Upon completing the mission in Utah, the expedition started back east to Leavenworth. Rather than follow the standard Oregon Trail route from Fort Bridger over South Pass through the Sweetwater River valley, Stansbury wanted to scout a more direct route east. Following the advice of Jim Bridger and local trappers and traders, the expedition followed the Blacks Fork River east, crossed the Green River near the present town of Green River, Wyoming and proceeded east along the Bitter Creek valley, crossing the Red Desert, and skirting the northern side of Elk Mountain across the Laramie Plains. They passed over the Laramie Mountains and made their way to Fort Laramie where they struck the Oregon Trail heading east.

Having now brought our reconnoissance [sic] for a new route from the waters of the Pacific to a point where its results can be at least approximately ascertained it is very gratifying to be able to state that these results are in a high degree satisfactory more so indeed than I had anticipated. It has been ascertained that a practicable route exists through the chain of the Rocky Mountains at a point sixty miles south of that now generally pursued and in a course as much more direct as the chord of an arc is than the arc itself.

== Later life ==
After the Utah expedition, Stansbury oversaw construction projects in Minnesota and Ohio. He served briefly as a mustering officer in Columbus, Ohio and as a recruiting officer in Wisconsin during the early years of the Civil War. He died in Madison on April 13, 1863.

== Legacy ==
The Stansbury expedition to Utah was a huge scientific success. He was the first to determine that the lake was actually a remnant of a larger inland freshwater pluvial lake (today called Lake Bonneville). The method of triangulation used to map the lake was a first for the Topographical Corps, and the method was put into standard use by the Corps and later by the US Geological Survey. The expedition collected many different species of birds, plants, lizards and mammals as well as rock samples and fossils. Several esteemed scientists of the day provided commentary in the expedition report, including Spencer Fullerton Baird (ornithologist and ichthyologist), Charles Frédéric Girard (ichthyologist and herpetologist), John Torrey (botanist) and James Hall (paleontologist). Several discovered species were heretofore unknown to science including Uta stansburiana which was named for the expedition leader.

In the late 1850s, Native American conflicts on the Oregon Trail forced the government to establish a new trail through Colorado and Wyoming known as the Overland Trail. Between Laramie and Fort Bridger, the trail follows almost exactly the route mapped by the expedition. In the 1860s the First transcontinental railroad also followed the path through southern Wyoming and Utah, although Stansbury had suggested that the railroad descend the Wasatch Mountains via Provo Canyon and cross the valley to the south of the lake rather than the actual path taken through Weber Canyon to the north. In the 20th century two major highways also followed the route: the Lincoln Highway and Interstate 80.

Lieutenant Gunnison wrote a book entitled The Mormons or Latter-Day Saints, in the Valley of the Great Salt Lake: A History of Their Rise and Progress, Peculiar Doctrines, Present Condition that together with the official expedition report provided many Americans with their first in-depth look at the Mormon faith. In 1853 Gunnison returned to Utah to survey a railroad route and was killed with 7 of his men by a band of Pah Vants.

== Namesakes ==
The Stansbury expedition named numerous geographical features in the Salt Lake Valley and environs. Some islands in the Great Salt Lake are named for members of the expedition, including Stansbury Island and Stansbury Bay, Carrington Island and Gunnison Island. The Stansbury Mountain range is located on the western side of the Tooele valley, and the community of Stansbury Park, Utah and Stansbury High School are located within the valley. In addition to Uta stansburiana, Stansbury was also honored with Purshia stansburyana (cliff-rose).
