= Redemption: For Robbing the Dead =

Redemption: For Robbing The Dead
- Film poser
- Directed by: Thomas Russell
- Written by: Thomas Russell
- Produced by: James Alexander; Courtney Russell; Asia Stryker
- Starring: Jon Gries; Edward Herrmann; Barry Corbin; Margot Kidder; Rance Howard; Gregg Christensen; Larry Thomas
- Cinematography: Derek Pueblo
- Edited by: A. Todd Smith
- Music by: Spencer Russell
- Distributed by: Monterey Media (US)
- Release date: October 16, 2011 (Heartland Film Festival)
- Country: United States
- Language: English

Redemption: For Robbing The Dead is a 2011 American Western independent film written and directed by Thomas Russell, a film professor at Brigham Young University. The film stars Jon Gries, Edward Herrmann, Barry Corbin, Gregg Christensen, Margot Kidder, Rance Howard, and Larry Thomas. Redemption: For Robbing The Dead is based on actual events, telling a fictionalized version of real-life grave robber Jean Baptiste who was sentenced to exile in Utah in 1862. The film was given an AML Award.

== Plot ==
The film is based on the experiences of mid-nineteenth century frontier police officer Henry Heath, who finds out that someone has been systematically robbing the graves in the town cemetery, where his own young daughter is buried. In dealing with the criminal, Heath has to look at his own beliefs about justice and redemption.

== Cast ==
- John Freeman as Henry Heath
- David H. Stevens as Jean Baptiste
- Robyn Adamson as Lucille Heath
- Jon Gries as Tom Sutter
- Edward Herrmann as Governor Dawson
- Barry Corbin as Judge Smith
- Margot Kidder as Marlys Baptiste
- Rance Howard as Doctor
- Larry Thomas as Josiah
- Gregg Christensen as Officer Dewey

== Festivals ==
Redemption: For Robbing The Dead was selected to screen at the following film festival:

- 2011 Heartland Film Festival
