= Fremont Island =

Island in the Great Salt Lake in Weber County, Utah, United States

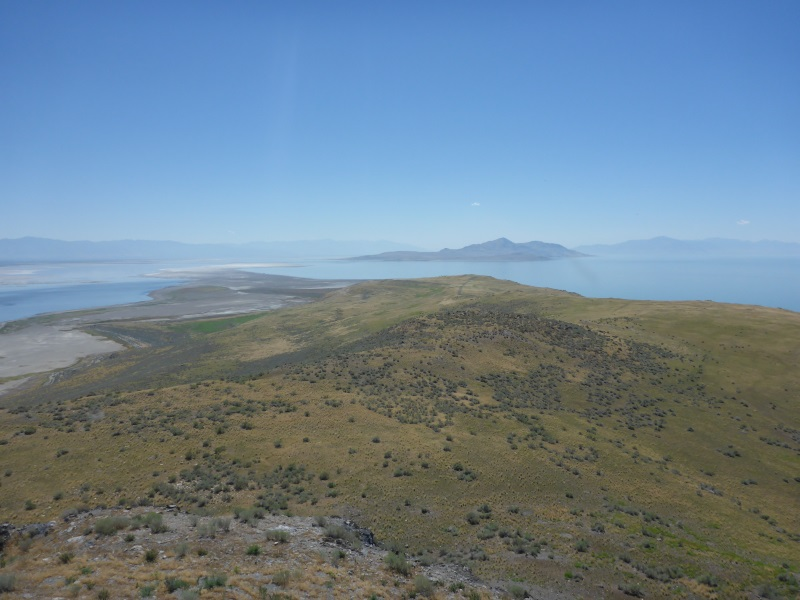
- View from Castle Rock, looking south toward Antelope Island, August 2014

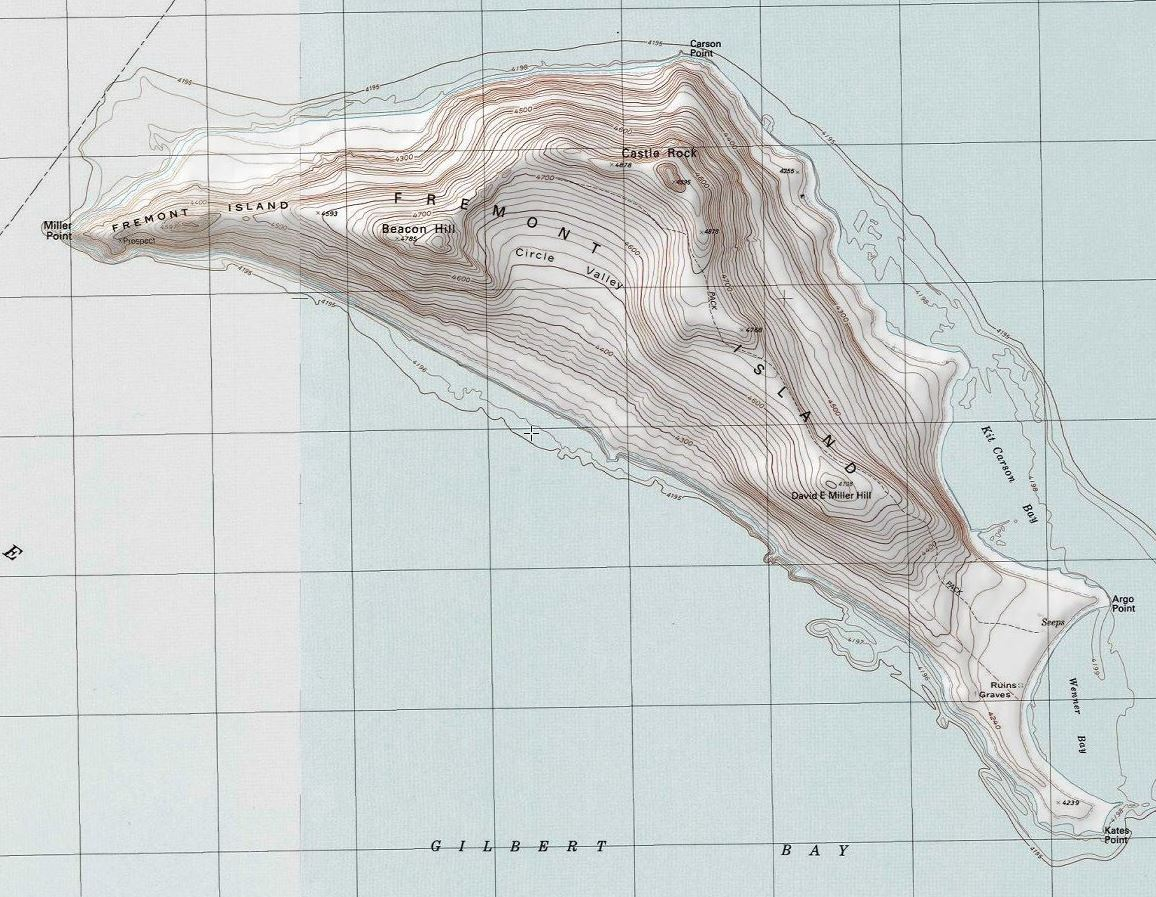
- Fremont Island map
- Etymology: John C. Frémont

Geography
- Location: Great Salt Lake
- Coordinates: 41°09′56″N 112°20′23″W
- Area: 11.91 km^{2} (4.60 sq mi)
- Length: 8.57 km (5.325 mi)
- Width: 2.76 km (1.715 mi)

Administration
- United States
- State: Utah
- County: Weber

Fremont Island is an island located in Great Salt Lake in northern Utah, United States. The size is about 4.6 square miles, or 2,943.04-acre (11.91 km^{2}) State owned, it is the lake's third largest island after Stansbury Island and Antelope Island. The island has also been known by several other names, including mo'ko-mom-bĭtc (in Gosiute Shoshoni), Castle Island, Coffin Island, Disappointment Island, and Miller Island.

== Human history ==
Fremont Island is named for military leader and explorer John C. Frémont.

In 1843, Kit Carson and John C. Frémont were the first explorers of European descent to visit the lake. Frémont was expecting to find an exotic paradise. Instead, he found little grass, and no trees, water or game. He dubbed it “disappointment island.” During their visit Kit Carson carved a cross into a rock which can still be seen.

In April 1848, a year after Mormon pioneers made it to the Salt Lake Valley, Albert Carrington and other pioneers boated around the area and dubbed it “Castle Island” due to a throne-like shape at the north end of the island.

It was first dubbed Fremont Island in 1850, when Capt. Howard Stansbury surveyed the Great Salt Lake. That name eventually stuck.

In 1859, two Farmington men placed 153 head of sheep on the island, even calling it “Miller’s Island” after one of the men, Dan Miller.

In 1862, Jean Baptiste, a gravedigger, was exiled to Fremont Island after being caught robbing nearly 300 graves in Salt Lake City. Weeks later, signs of his escape were found, but Baptiste had vanished, and his fate remains a mystery.

In the early 1870s, the island became a spot for precious metal mining — though only 38 claims were made over a two-year span.

In 1886, a judge named Uriah J. Wenner moved his family to the island. Wenner was diagnosed with tuberculosis and moved his family to Fremont Island because of its remote location. He and his family remained there until he died in 1891 and was even buried on the island. His wife, Kate, left the island and eventually remarried. When she died in 1942, her ashes were placed next to Uriah's on the island.

In 2003 the island was leased by the Barrow Land and Livestock company. Exotic species of animals were brought to the island with the intent to provide unique hunting opportunities. In October 2013 a feral pig was spotted near the Antelope Island causeway. This prompted the state authorities to investigate and find populations of illegal species. The state and owners then proceeded to hunt the remaining animals by air to prevent the potential spread to the mainland.

In February 2018 Fremont Island was purchased by a group that included diesel truck entrepreneur David "Heavy D" Sparks as an investment. Great Salt Lake conservation groups expressed concern over potential future plans for the island, including a development plan to build thousands of homes there, and hoped that the State of Utah would acquire the land. In December 2020 the island was donated to the State of Utah by The Nature Conservancy, which had purchased the island to prevent commercial development. The state will own and manage the island for public recreational use, and The Nature Conservancy holds an easement to ensure the island's continued preservation.

== Access ==
Fremont Island is owned by the State of Utah (DNR - Division of Forestry, Fire & State Lands) as of 5 December 2020. The island is accessible via an exposed sand bar when the Great Salt Lake water level is lower than 4,194 feet in elevation. The start point of the land bridge is approximately 1 mile east of the Antelope Island Marina and can be accessed via the Antelope Island causeway. Access by boat is best done in a flat-bottomed craft as water levels near the island are very shallow. Traveling to the island on foot or by bicycle is a muddy affair and may be best done when water levels are low or during winter months when the soft mud is frozen.

== Flora ==
There are certain plant species that occur on Fremont Island, and there is historic evidence that some species that were earlier documented to occur on the island are no longer present. For example, explorers who visited this island in the mid-1800s noted the presence of abundant "onions" which they identified as Calochortus luteus. However, this name was applied to plants that were later renamed as other species. While it is unlikely that the California endemic C. luteus occurred on Fremont Island, it is clear that some species of Calochortus once present is now extinct.
