= Cub Island =

Island in Utah, United States

Coordinates: 41.34798°N 112.85359°W

Cub Island is an island in Box Elder County, Utah, United States.

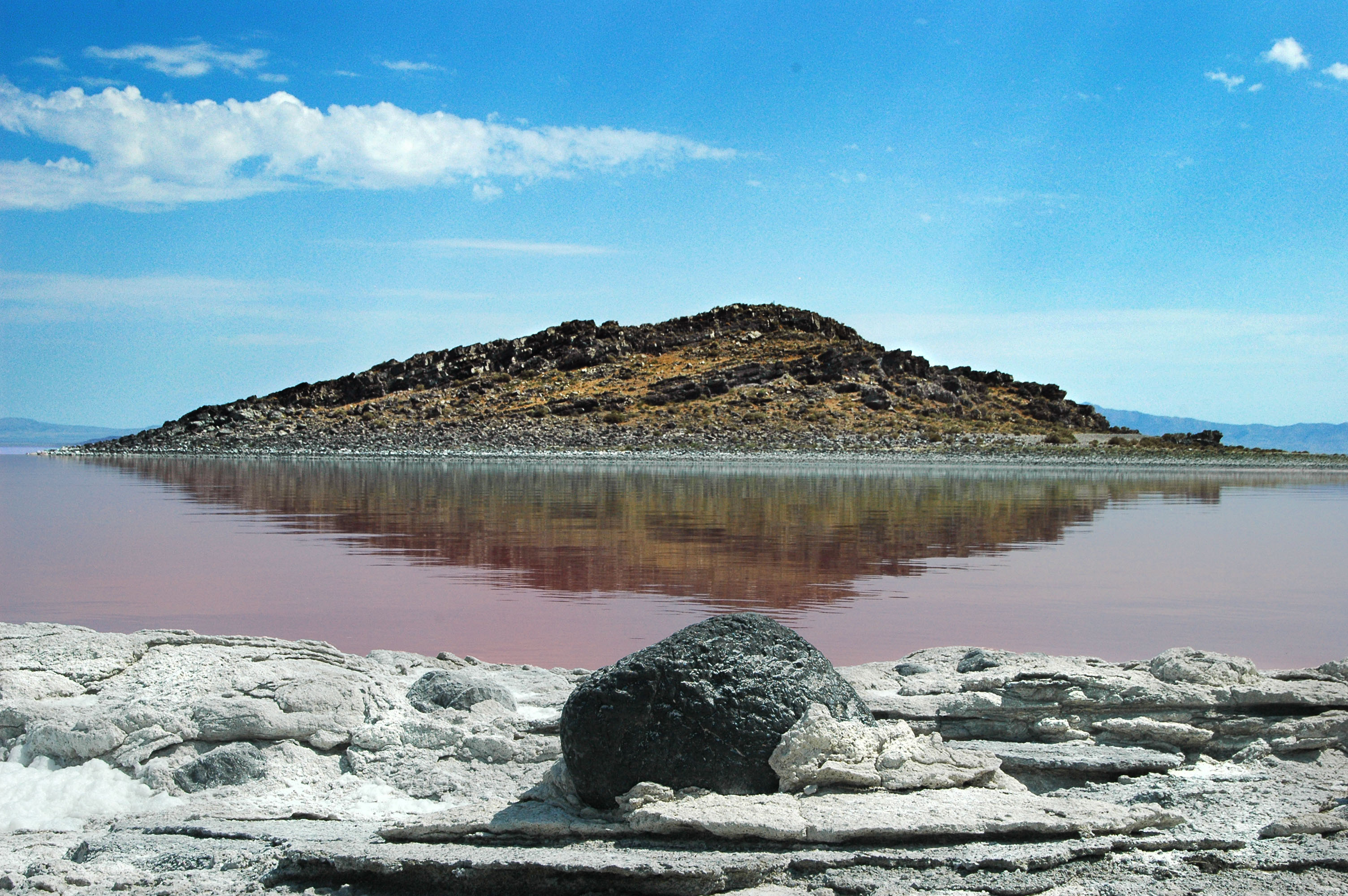
Cub Island as seen from the northern end of Gunnison Island.

Cub Island was so named on account of its smaller size to nearby Gunnison Island. During periods of lower water levels, Cub Island is connected to Gunnison Island by an exposed shoal.
