= Jean Baptiste (grave robber) =

19th-century gravedigger and grave robber in Utah Territory

- Born: c. 1813; Ireland (per 1860 Census)
- Disappeared: 1862 (aged 49); Fremont Island, Utah Territory, U.S.
- Status: Disappeared; fate unknown
- Other name: Grave Robber of Salt Lake City
- Occupation: Gravedigger

Jean Baptiste (c. 1813 – disappeared 1862) was a grave robber in the Utah Territory during the mid-19th century. While employed as a city gravedigger in Salt Lake City, he desecrated an estimated 300 graves before his discovery in 1862. His crimes, which involved wearing the clothing of the deceased and hoarding stolen funeral goods, led to his exile to a remote island in the Great Salt Lake, from which he disappeared and was never recovered.

== Early life ==
Jean Baptiste's early life is poorly documented. The 1860 United States census lists his birth year as 1813 and his birthplace as Ireland, though contemporary accounts frequently speculated he was French or Italian. In the mid-1850s, he lived in Victoria, Australia, during the gold rush. While there, he encountered missionaries from The Church of Jesus Christ of Latter-day Saints (LDS Church) and converted to the faith. He reportedly donated property for a chapel used by missionaries in Australia.

In 1855, he boarded the ship Tarkania for California; after the vessel was scuttled in Hawaii, he worked as a teacher in Honolulu before reaching San Francisco in 1856. He settled in Salt Lake City in 1859 and was employed as a gravedigger for the city cemetery. He lived with his wife, Maria, who later claimed she had no knowledge of his criminal activities.

== Discovery of crimes ==
In January 1862, police officer Henry Heath personally purchased burial clothing for the interment of an outlaw named Moroni Clawson. When Clawson's body was later exhumed by his brother George, it was discovered to have been stripped of its burial clothes, raising suspicions of grave robbery.

Heath and cemetery sexton J. C. Little began an investigation and searched Baptiste's home. To ensure legal procedure, Heath sought direction from Probate Judge Elias Smith, who oversaw the subsequent search of the residence. Investigators discovered boxes containing approximately 60 pairs of children's shoes, a dozen pairs of men's shoes, funeral shrouds, and infant clothing. Baptiste was found to be wearing the burial suits of the deceased and using wood from stolen coffins as fuel for his fireplace. He specifically targeted the graves of children and the wealthy due to the quality of their clothing.

When confronted, Baptiste confessed. He admitted to similar grave robberies while living in Australia and estimated he had robbed as many as 300 graves in Salt Lake City over three and a half years. While families attempted to identify the recovered items at the courthouse, most of the clothing was eventually placed in a large box and buried in a single communal grave at the cemetery.

== Exile and disappearance ==
To prevent mob violence, LDS Church President Brigham Young addressed the community and reassured them that the thefts would not affect the resurrection. Young proposed exile, suggesting that families could reclaim remains if they wished, though he emphasized it was not necessary.

City officials secretly transported Baptiste to Antelope Island, but later moved him to the more isolated Fremont Island. According to local folklore, his ears were severed and his forehead was branded with the words "For Robbing the Dead" before his banishment, though these claims are not supported by the primary judicial record.

Three weeks after his exile, cattle herders on Fremont Island found that Baptiste had killed a heifer for food and leather and dismantled a cabin, presumably to build a raft. Historians at the Utah Division of State History primarily theorize that Baptiste attempted to cross to the mainland but drowned in the Great Salt Lake. An alternative theory suggests he successfully reached the northern shore and fled to mining camps in the Montana Territory or Idaho Territory.

In March 1893, hunters near the Jordan River discovered a skeleton with an iron shackle around its leg, leading to rumors of his death; however, Henry Heath confirmed Baptiste was never shackled, suggesting the remains belonged to an unrelated individual.

== Legacy ==
Baptiste's story is a persistent subject of regional folklore. In these narratives, his spirit is often described as a figure haunting the southern shores of the Great Salt Lake while carrying a bundle of burial clothes. His life was dramatized in the 2011 film Redemption: For Robbing the Dead, directed by Brigham Young University professor Tom Russell.

== See also ==
- List of fugitives from justice who disappeared
- Great Salt Lake folklore
