= Gunnison Island =

Island in Box Elder County, Utah, United States

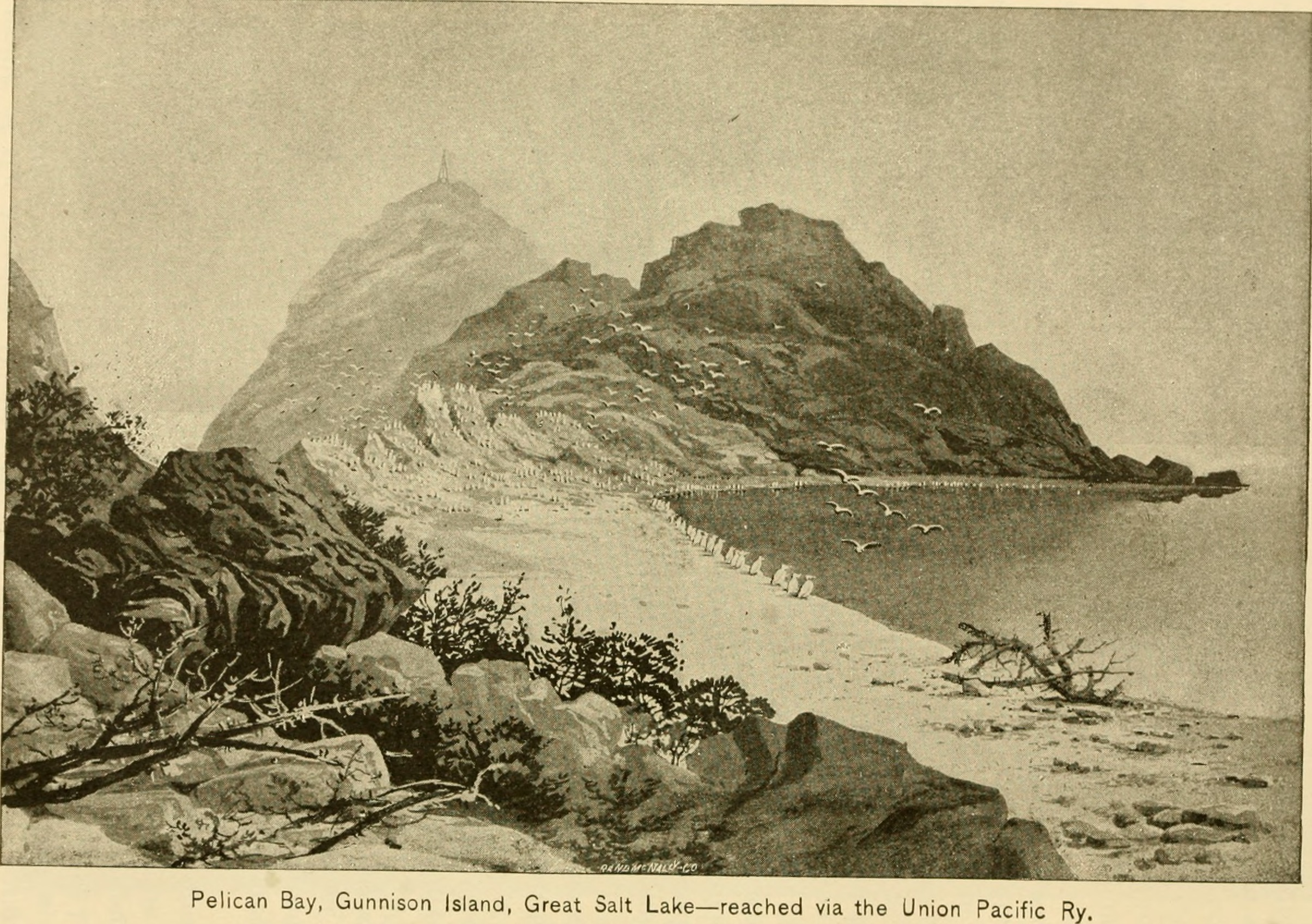
- Gunnison Island, 1891
- Interactive map of Gunnison Island

Geography
- Location: Great Salt Lake
- Coordinates: 41.339°N 112.858°W
- Area: 4.8 km^{2} (1.9 sq mi)
- Length: 1 mi (2 km)
- Width: 0.5 mi (0.8 km)

Administration
- United States
- State: Utah
- County: Box Elder

Gunnison Island is located in the northwest quadrant of the Great Salt Lake in Box Elder County, Utah, United States, approximately 55 miles (89 km) northwest of Salt Lake City and about 6 miles (9.7 km) east from the lake's western shore, and is best known as an important rookery for the American white pelican (Pelecanus erythrorhynchos). The California gull (Larus californicus) also nests on the island, and occasional nesters include the great blue heron (Ardea herodias), common raven (Corvus corax), prairie falcon (Falco mexicanus), and rock wren (Salpinctes obsoltetus).

The entire island was designated as the Gunnison Island State Wildlife Management Area in the late 1970s. Access to the island is restricted to prevent curious tourists from disturbing the nesting birds.

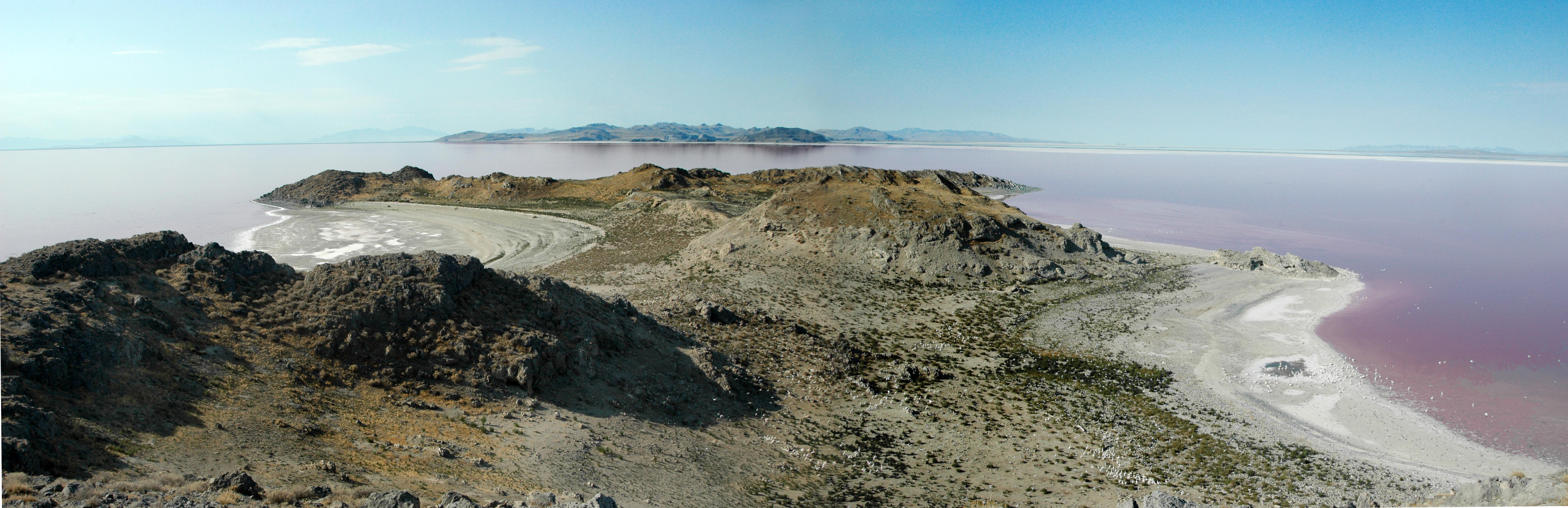
View looking south from the peak at the northern end of Gunnison Island. Carrington Island is in the immediate distance. Notice the red water, which characterizes of the northern arm of the Great Salt Lake. Also notice the large number of nesting American pelicans along the shore of the bay on the western side of the island.

Wildlife biologists estimate that the population on Gunnison Island (about 10,000) constitutes about 10–20% of the entire American white pelican population; there are also about 15,000 California gulls that nest on the island.

Historically, the island's remote location protected it from predators, which made it an ideal spot for ground-nesting birds. However, due to recent low lake levels, it is no longer an island; it is connected to shore by a land bridge which predators can use.

The remoteness also forces the pelicans to travel 30 miles (48 km) or more to find fresh water and food. The pelicans typically fly east to the Bear River Migratory Bird Refuge, where the Bear River flows into the Great Salt Lake. In the bird refuge, the water's salinity is low enough that fish can live there. (The Great Salt Lake contains no fish.)

The pelicans have also been known to fly south to Utah Lake, about 100 miles (160 km) away. To get to their destinations, large flocks of adult pelicans ride thermals to a great height, then coast down to their destination.

== History ==
Gunnison Island was named after John W. Gunnison, an American explorer and surveyor of the Great Salt Lake valley in 1849.

In the mid-1890s, artist and author Alfred Lambourne spent a year living in solitude on the island. From November 1895 to March 1896, he was alone. In March, a few enterprising individuals decided to harvest and sell the abundant guano that the nesting birds left behind as fertilizer. Lambourne included musings about these guano sifters in his work Our Inland Sea, which he authored during his time on the island. Lambourne left the island early in the winter of 1896 along with the first group of guano sifters.

The mining activity caused the pelicans to temporarily abandon Gunnison Island as a nesting site, though the gulls remained despite the human company. Because of the difficulty of obtaining the guano, however, and its tendency to dissolve in the rain and wash back into the Great Salt Lake, the guano industry was abandoned about ten years after it began.

== See also ==
- Carrington Island
- Fremont Island
- Promontory Mountains
