= Stansbury Island =

Island in the Great Salt Lake, Utah, United States

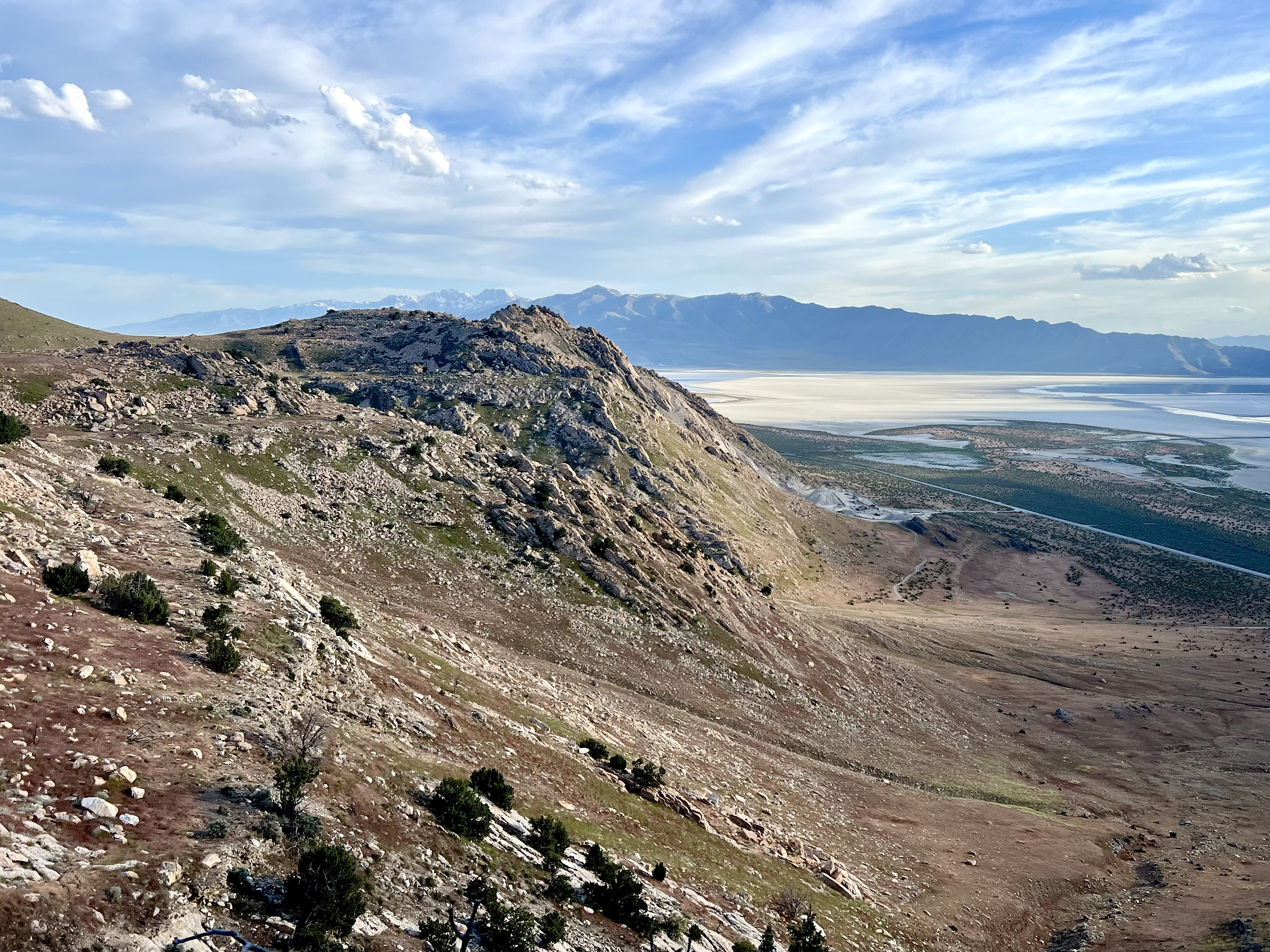
- Stansbury Island Trail Facing Southwest
- Interactive map of Stansbury Island
- Etymology: Howard Stansbury

Geography
- Location: Great Salt Lake
- Coordinates: 40°49′47″N 112°29′52″W
- Highest elevation: 6,647 ft (2026 m)

Administration
- United States
- State: Utah

Stansbury Island is the second largest island within the Great Salt Lake in the U.S. state of Utah. Located in Tooele County, it is considered an island even though a dirt causeway connects it to the mainland. Stansbury Island was named after Howard Stansbury, the leader of a government expedition that surveyed the lake in 1849.

A biking trail is located on the island. Petroglyphs and two caves large enough to explore are also located on the island. Its peak is Castle Rock, at 6647 feet above sea level. Camping is permitted in most areas.

== Geography and geology ==
Stansbury Island is longitudinally aligned and is approximately 11.5 miles (18.5 km) long, 4.5 miles (7.2 km) wide, and 22,314 acres (90.30 km^{2}) in area. The island is a desert mountain/mountain range, with a few fresh water seeps along the eastern side. The western side lacks water. The island is uninhabited and is used as a winter feeding ground for sheep. Average annual precipitation is approximately six inches.

The rocks on the island are mostly early Paleozoic in age. Precambrian strata are present at the north tip and along a portion of the northeast shore. The quartzite ledge on the southern part of the island is Devonian in age. The remaining northern third of the island dates back to the Cambrian Period, consisting of a small outcrop of Tintic Quartzite, but mainly middle Cambrian limestone, shale, and dolomite. The rest of the island is composed of Upper Cambrian to Upper Mississippian strata, mostly limestone, dolomite, quartzite, and shale.

The southern half of the island was folded into a southward anticline. The northern half of the island is composed of a series of northwesterly trending fault blocks in which the strata dip to the west. The faults in the north section are transverse and may have some strike–slip component.

Claret Cup cacti grow in abundance on the island, which forms the northern limit of their natural range. Unusually large juniper trees were noted by Howard Stansbury in his 1850 survey of the island.

Bolinder Resources runs a quarry on the island. They quarry quartzite for railroad ballast.

== See also ==
- Antelope Island
- Carrington Island
- Stansbury Mountains
- Fremont Island
