= Albert Carrington =

American journalist and religious leader

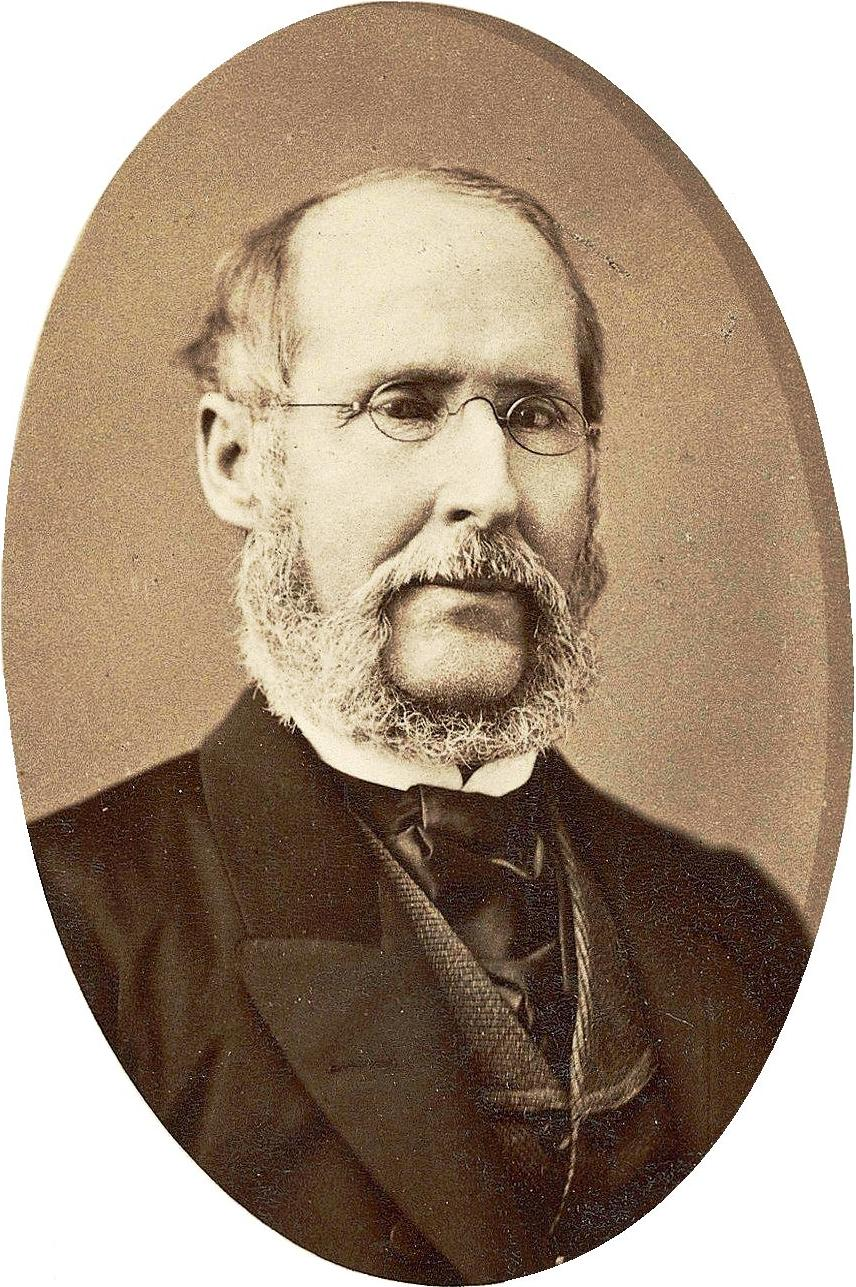

Quorum of the Twelve Apostles
- August 29, 1877 – November 7, 1885
- End reason: Excommunicated for adultery

Assistant Counselor in the First Presidency
- May 9, 1874 – August 29, 1877
- End reason: Dissolution of First Presidency upon death of Brigham Young

Counselor in the First Presidency
- June 8, 1873 – May 9, 1874
- End reason: Called as Assistant Counselor in the First Presidency

Quorum of the Twelve Apostles
- July 3, 1870 – June 8, 1873
- End reason: Called as Counselor in the First Presidency

LDS Church Apostle
- July 3, 1870 – November 7, 1885
- Reason: Death of Ezra T. Benson
- End reason: Excommunicated for adultery
- Reorganization at end of term: Marriner W. Merrill, Anthon H. Lund, and Abraham H. Cannon ordained

Personal details
- Born: January 8, 1813; Royalton, Vermont, United States
- Died: September 19, 1889 (aged 76); Salt Lake City, Utah Territory, United States
- Resting place: Salt Lake City Cemetery; 40°46′37.92″N 111°51′28.8″W
- Spouse(s): Rhoda Maria Woods; Mary Rock
- Children: 15
- Parents: Daniel Van Carrington; Isabella Bowman
- Signature
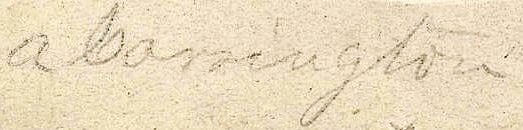

Albert Carrington (January 8, 1813 – September 19, 1889) was an apostle and member of the Quorum of the Twelve Apostles and First Presidency of the Church of Jesus Christ of Latter-day Saints (LDS Church).

== Early life ==
Carrington was born in Royalton, Vermont. He graduated from Dartmouth College in 1833 and taught school and studied law in Pennsylvania. In 1839, he married Rhoda Maria Woods. The Carringtons were baptized into the Church of Jesus Christ of Latter Day Saints in Wiota, Wisconsin, on July 18, 1841, and in 1844 moved to Nauvoo, Illinois, to join the gathering of Latter Day Saints. In January 1846, Carrington took Mary Rock as a plural wife. Following the death of Joseph Smith, Carrington followed Brigham Young to the Salt Lake Valley.

== In Utah Territory ==
Carrington was the editor of the LDS Church-owned Deseret News from 1854 to 1856 and again from 1862 until 1867. He was elected multiple times to the Legislative Council in the Utah territorial legislature until 1868.

While serving as Brigham Young's secretary, in 1849 Carrington was hired by Howard Stansbury to make a survey of the Great Salt Lake. Carrington accompanied Stansbury to Washington, D.C., in 1850 to report on the expedition's efforts and returned to Utah in 1851. Carrington Island was named for him in honor of his contributions to the expedition.

== Church service ==
Carrington became an apostle and a member of the Quorum of the Twelve on July 3, 1870. He was the president of the European Mission four times—once prior to becoming an apostle (1868–70) and three times as an apostle (1871–73, 1875–77, 1880–82). Carrington was the tenth official Church Historian of the LDS Church between 1871 and 1874. From 1873 until 1877, he was a counselor to Young in the First Presidency and served as Young's personal secretary for more than 20 years.

== Excommunication and readmission ==
Carrington was excommunicated from the LDS Church by the Quorum of the Twelve Apostles on November 6, 1885, for adultery, fornication, and "lewd and lascivious conduct". Carrington's extramarital relationships had begun in England while he was the mission president; he had hid these relationships from the leaders of the church for over 10 years and had lied to the Quorum of the Twelve Apostles about them when rumors about Carrington began spreading. (The Salt Lake Tribune first accused Carrington of adultery in 1875.) In 1885, Carrington argued before the Twelve that because he did not ejaculate inside the women he had sexual relations with, he had technically not committed adultery, but had simply committed "a little folly in Israel". The Quorum disagreed and excommunicated him.

Carrington was rebaptized on November 1, 1887. Upon his rebaptism, he was not reinstated as an apostle or as a general authority.

On his deathbed, Carrington received permission to be ordained an elder so that he could be buried in his temple robes. Wilford Woodruff, the president of the church, sent Angus M. Cannon to ordain him. Cannon arrived at 3:57 pm but Carrington had died at 3:42 pm. It was later decided that he could be buried in his temple clothing. Carrington died at Salt Lake City, Utah Territory, at age 76, and was buried at Salt Lake City Cemetery. Only a portion of his original headstone still remains.

== Works ==
- Carrington, Albert (1947). Diary of Albert Carrington (Heart throbs of the West). Daughters of Utah Pioneers, Central Company.

== See also ==
- Soaking (sexual practice)

== External resources ==
- Grampa Bill's General Authority Pages

The Church of Jesus Christ of Latter-day Saints titles
Preceded by Brigham Young, Jr.	Quorum of the Twelve Apostles; July 3, 1870 – June 8, 1873; August 29, 1877 – November 7, 1885	Succeeded by Moses Thatcher
