= Carrington Island =

Island in Utah

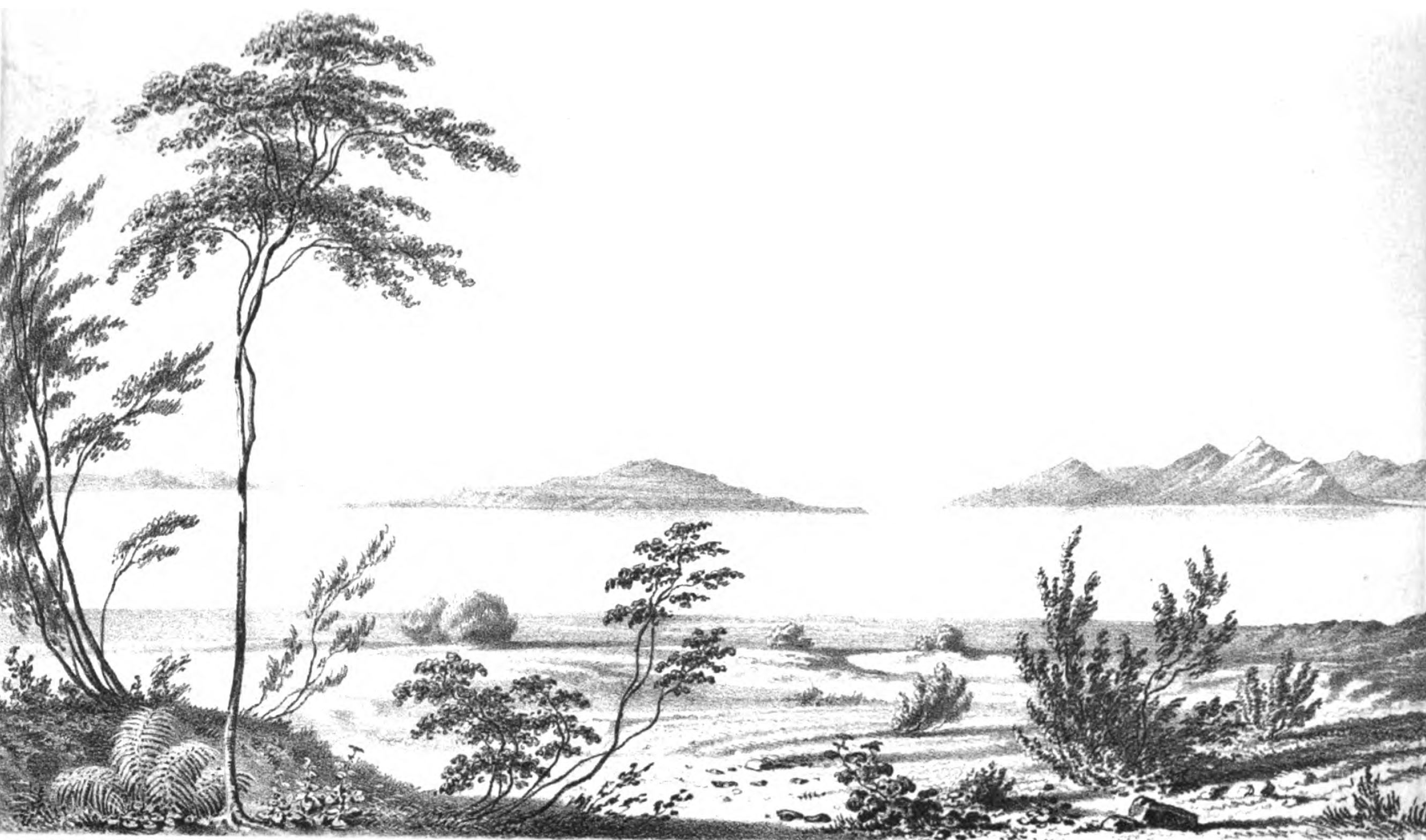
- Carrington Island seen from Stansbury Island during the Stansbury Expedition (1850)
- Interactive map of Carrington Island

Geography
- Location: Great Salt Lake
- Coordinates: 41°0′24.9438″N 112°34′15.7584″W
- Area: 4.8 km^{2} (1.9 sq mi)
- Length: 2.7 km (1.68 mi)
- Width: 3.2 km (1.99 mi)

Administration
- United States
- State: Utah
- County: Tooele

Carrington Island is a 1,200-acre island located in the Great Salt Lake in northern Utah. It is the fourth-largest island in the lake.

== History ==
Carrington Island is named for Albert Carrington, Utah pioneer and apostle of The Church of Jesus Christ of Latter-day Saints. Lambourne's Rock (elevation 4727 feet) at the summit of the island is named for painter Alfred Lambourne.

Charles Stoddard filed a homestead claim on the island in 1932 and built a cabin, but left the island after his well produced only saltwater. Stoddard Point on the island's northeastern shore was named after him.

The US Army operated the Carrington Island Precision Bombing Range on the island during World War II. Its surface remains pockmarked with bomb craters from this era. As the island was never cleaned up due to its remote location, unexploded ordnance may still be present. SAC Bay on the island's southeastern shore and SAC Point on the island's southern tip were named for the Strategic Air Command during the island's use as a bombing range.

Brine shrimp harvesters in the area operate a radio repeater on the summit of the island.

== Access ==
The northwestern 542 acres of the island are privately owned by the Six Mile Ranch Co. of Grantsville, UT. The remainder of the island is public land managed by the Bureau of Land Management. Sandbars connect the island to Stansbury Island and to the mainland but are cut by canals.

== See also ==
- Stansbury Island
- Gunnison Island
