= Mineral Fork Formation =

Geologic formation

- Stratigraphic range: Proterozoic
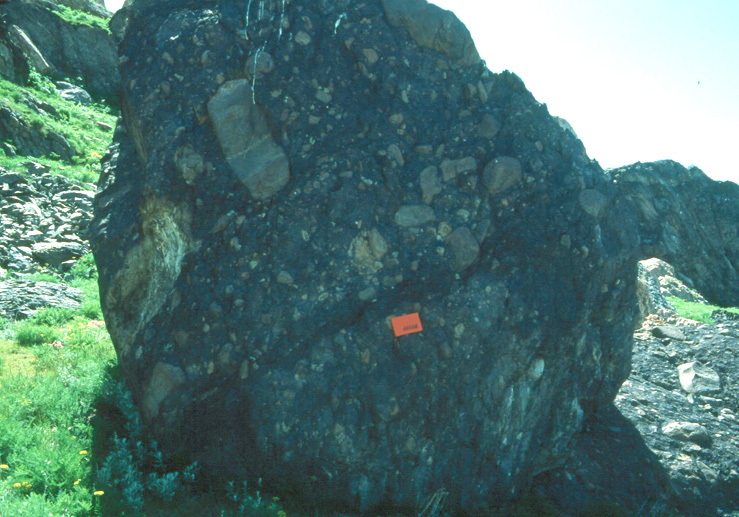
- Boulder of diamictite of the Mineral Fork Formation, along the Elephant Head Trail, Antelope Island, Utah.
- Type: sedimentary
- Underlies: Mutual Formation (Big Cottonwood Canyon), Tintic Formation (Santaquin-Provo), or Kelly Canyon Formation (Antelope Island)
- Overlies: Farmington Canyon Complex (Antelope Island), Big Cottonwood Formation (other locations)
- Thickness: 1000 to 3000 feet

Lithology
- Primary: Tillite, Shale, Quartzite, Conglomerate

Location
- Region: Southern Rocky Mountains
- Extent: Wasatch Mountains, Antelope Island

Type section
- Named for: Mineral Fork, Salt Lake County, Utah
- Named by: Granger et al., 1952

The Mineral Fork Formation is a mapped Proterozoic bedrock unit in Utah.

== Description ==
Granger et al. (1952) describe the Mineral Fork Formation as black tillite consisting of boulders, cobbles and pebbles of quartzite, limestone, or granitic rocks in a black sandy matrix, with dark-gray to black varved slate or shale, dark-gray quartzite, and occasional channel fillings of boulder conglomerate.

=== Exposures ===
According to Yonkee et al. (2000), the Mineral Fork is exposed at the following locations in Utah:

- Antelope Island
- Big Cottonwood Canyon
- Santaquin-Provo

And also:

- Little Cottonwood Canyon

=== Fossils ===
Abundant microfossils of planktonic alga of Bavlinella faveolata.

== Age ==
The presence of Bavlinella faveolata in the formation indicates a likely age of 750–650 Ma, because this fossil occurs elsewhere where it is well-dated radiometrically. The Mineral Fork Formation is no older than 1,250 Ma and no younger than 540 Ma. Thus it is likely Neoproterozoic but possibly Mesoproterozoic.
