= Diamictite =

Type of sedimentary rock

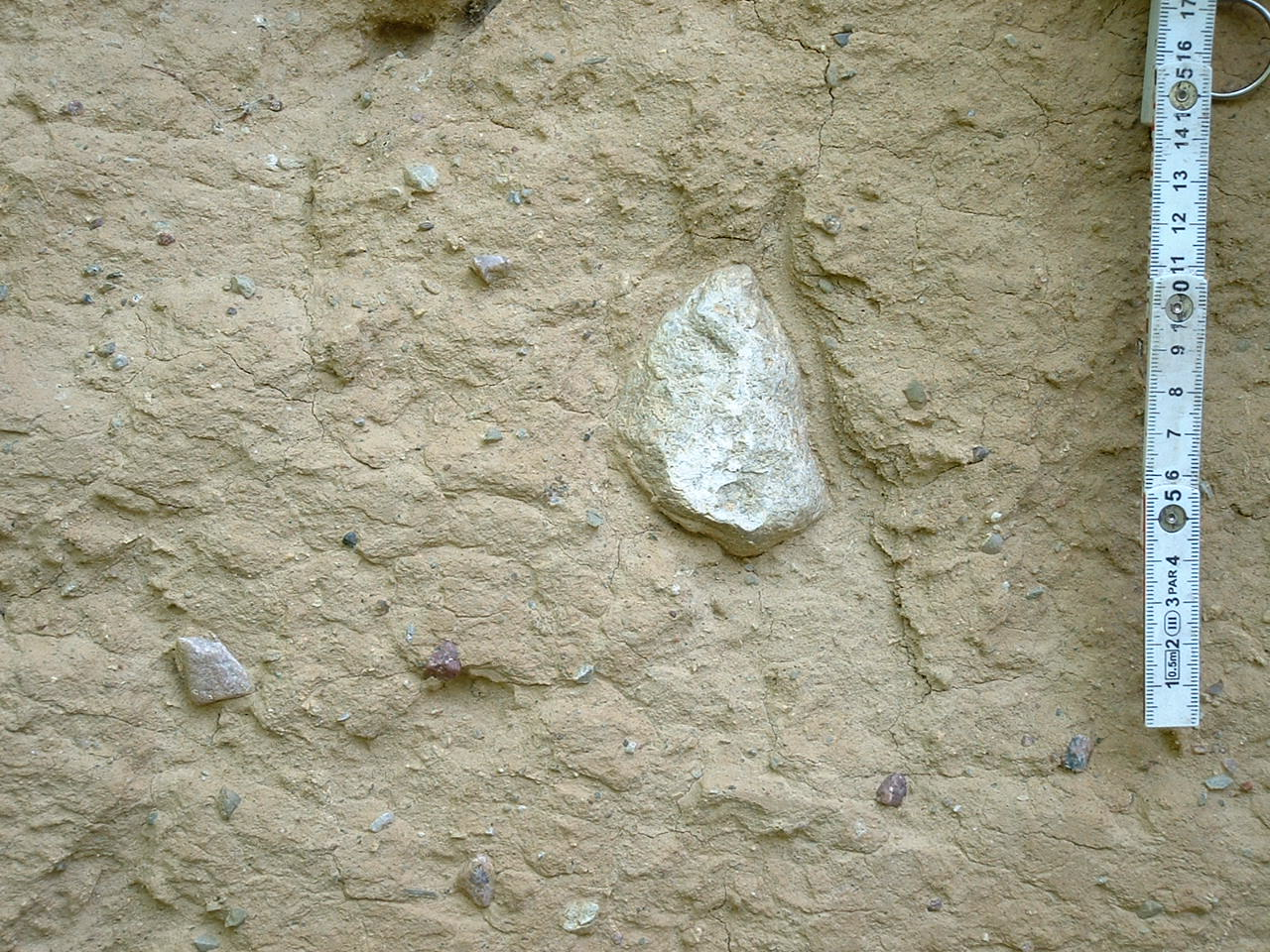
Diamictite from Stolpe, eastern Germany

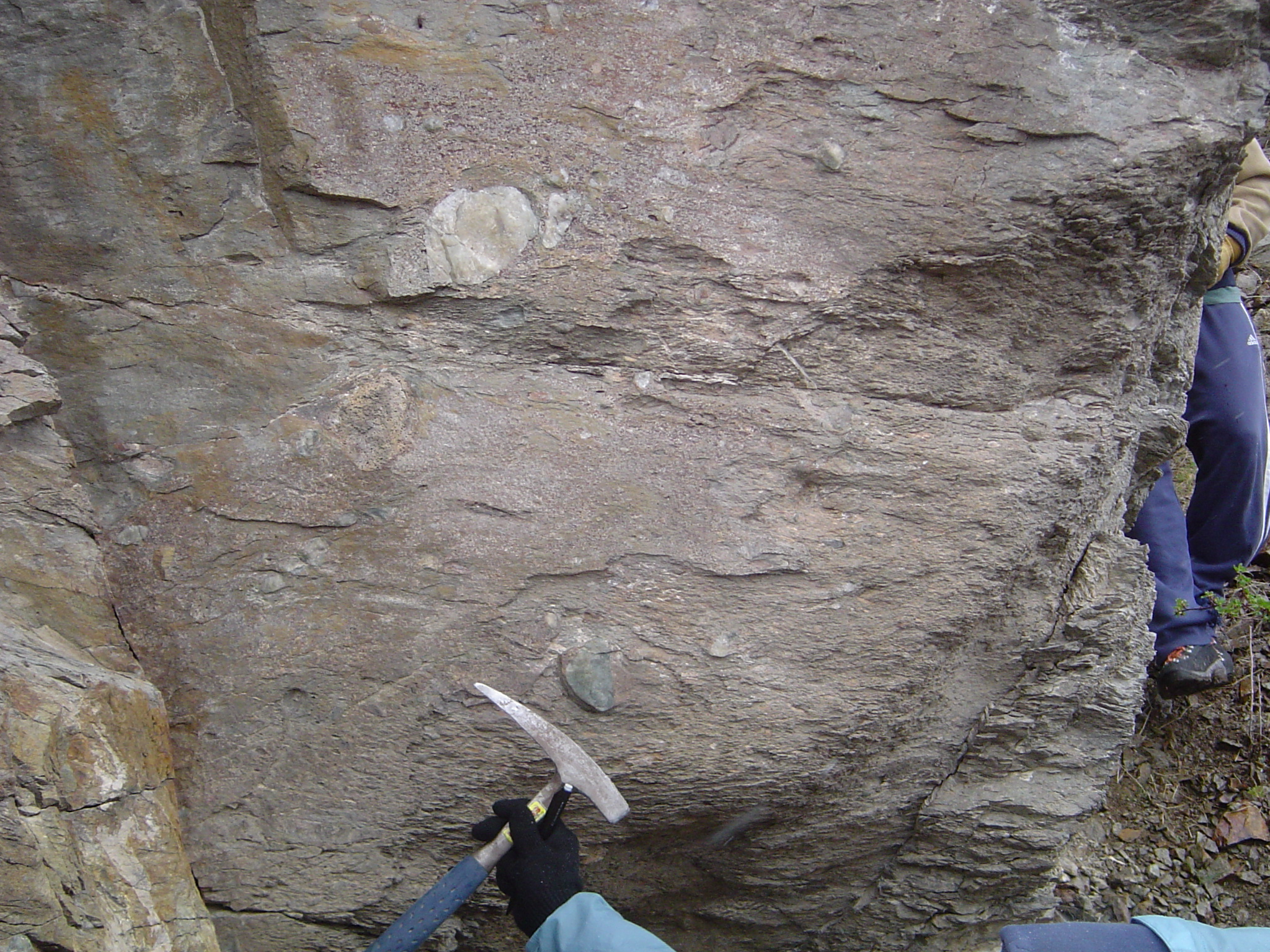
'Snowball Earth'-type diamictite from the Pocatello Formation, Idaho, United States

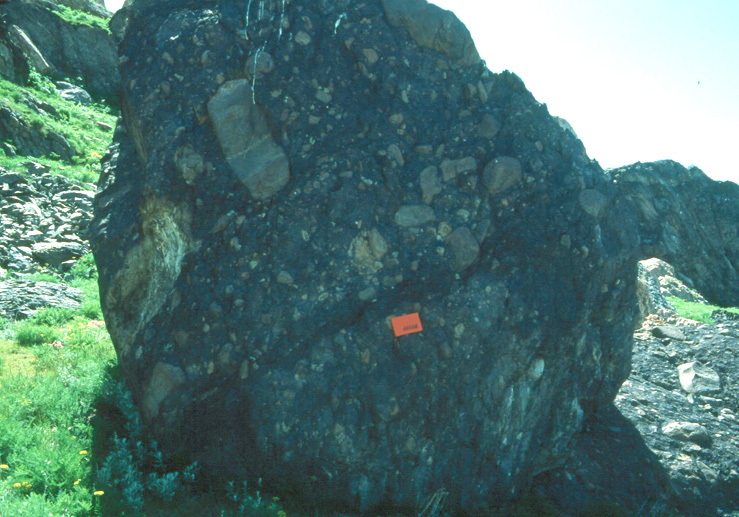
Boulder of diamictite of the Mineral Fork Formation, Antelope Island, Utah, United States

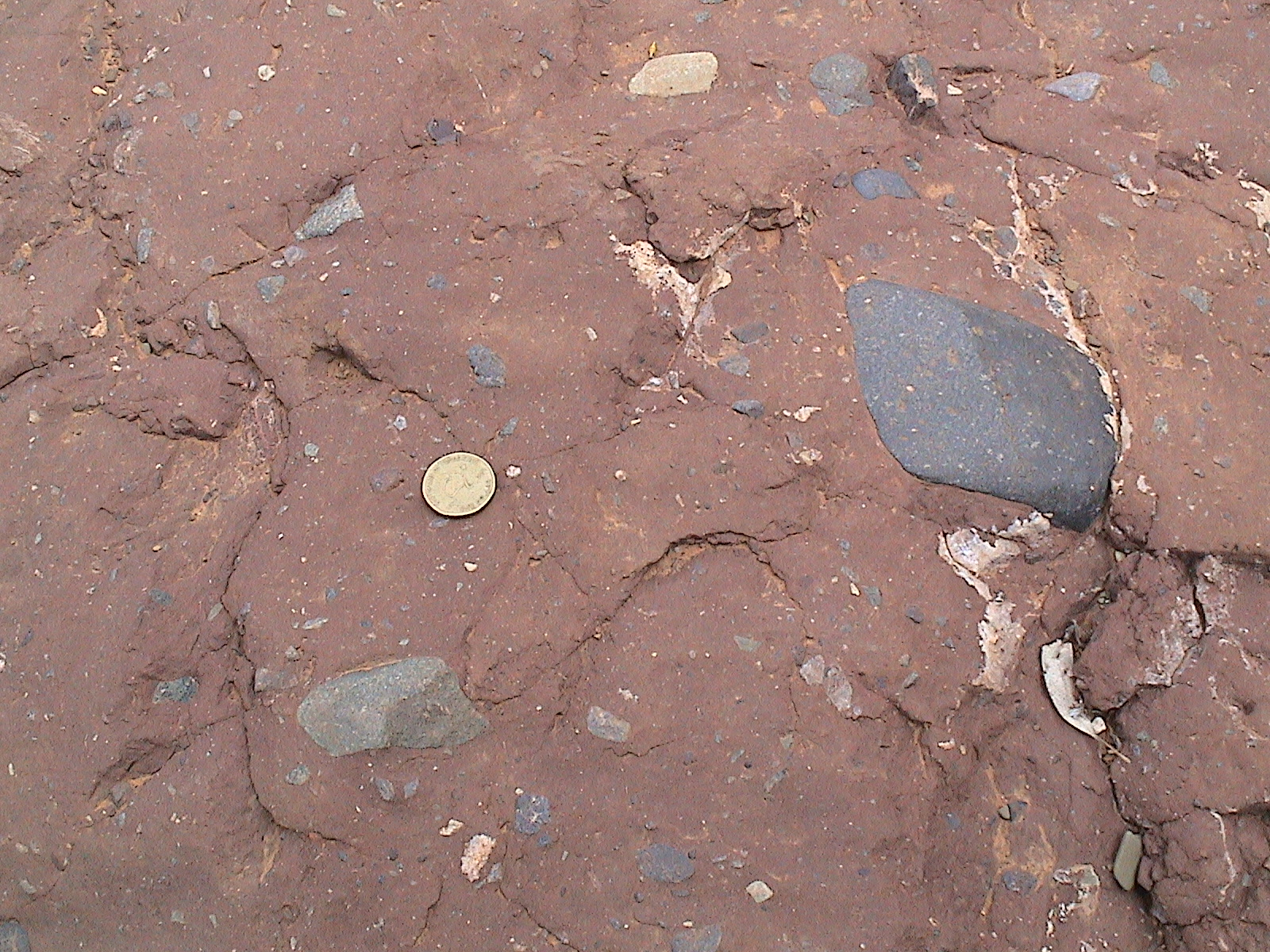
Elatina Formation diamictite below Ediacaran GSSP site in the Flinders Ranges NP, South Australia. A$1 coin for scale.

Diamictite ( /ˈdaɪ.əmɪktaɪt/; from Ancient Greek dia- (δια): 'through' and meiktós (µεικτός): 'mixed') is a type of lithified sedimentary rock that consists of unsorted to poorly sorted terrigenous sediment containing particles that range in size from clay to boulders, suspended in a matrix of mudstone or sandstone. The term was coined by Richard Foster Flint and others as a purely descriptive term, devoid of any reference to a particular origin. Some geologists restrict the usage to unsorted or poorly sorted conglomerate or breccia that consists of sparse, terrigenous gravel suspended in either a mud or sand matrix.

Unlithified diamictite is referred to as diamicton.

The term diamictite is often applied to unsorted or poorly sorted, lithified glacial deposits such as glacial tillite and boulder clay. Diamictites in general are often understood to have been formed by ancient glaciers, for example the Snowball Earth hypothesis rests on this explanation. However the most common origin for diamictites is deposition by submarine mass flows like turbidites and olistostromes in tectonically active areas, and they can be produced by a range of geological conditions. A list of theorized origins include:

- glacial
  - meltwater flow deposition
  - unsorted moraine glacial till
  - basal melt-out
  - ice rafted sediments deposited by melting icebergs or disintegrating ice sheets (dropstones)
- volcanic
  - lahars
  - lahar mass flows entering the ocean
- marine
  - debris flow
  - turbiditic olistostromes
  - mixing of sediments by submarine landslides
- tectonic
  - fault gouge
- erosional
  - regolith, in the form of a debris flow
  - other mass wasting events
- extraterrestrial
  - impact breccia
