= Antelope Island =

Island in the Great Salt Lake in Utah, United States

Native name: Pa'ri-bi-na
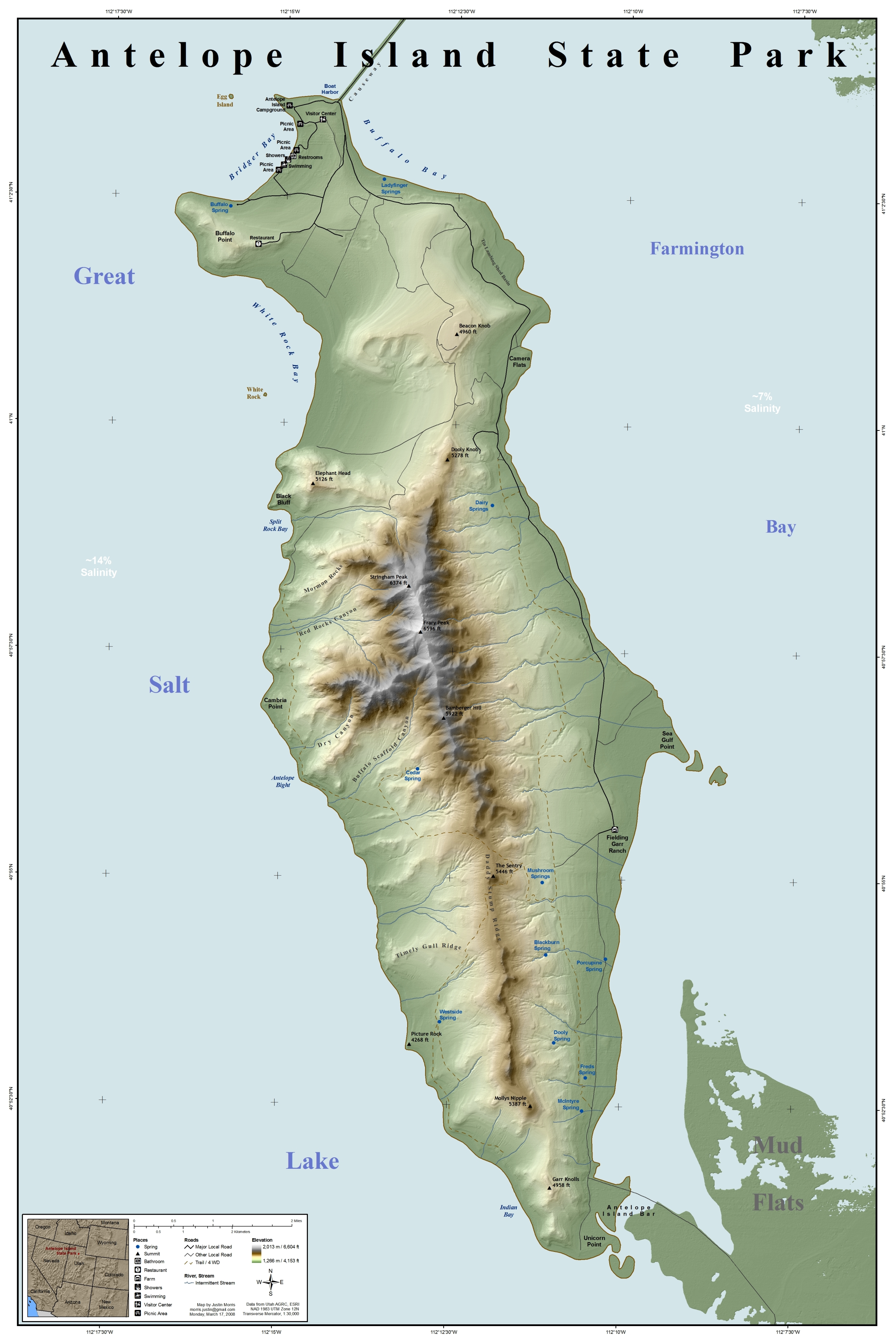
- Island map created by Justin Morris (2008)
- Interactive map of Antelope Island

Geography
- Location: Great Salt Lake, Utah, United States
- Coordinates: 40°57′30″N 112°12′50″W
- Area: 28,240 acres (11,430 ha)
- Length: 24 km (14.9 mi)
- Width: 7.8 km (4.85 mi)
- Highest point: Frary Peak 6,596 ft (2,010 m)

Additional information
- Official website: Official website

Antelope Island State Park
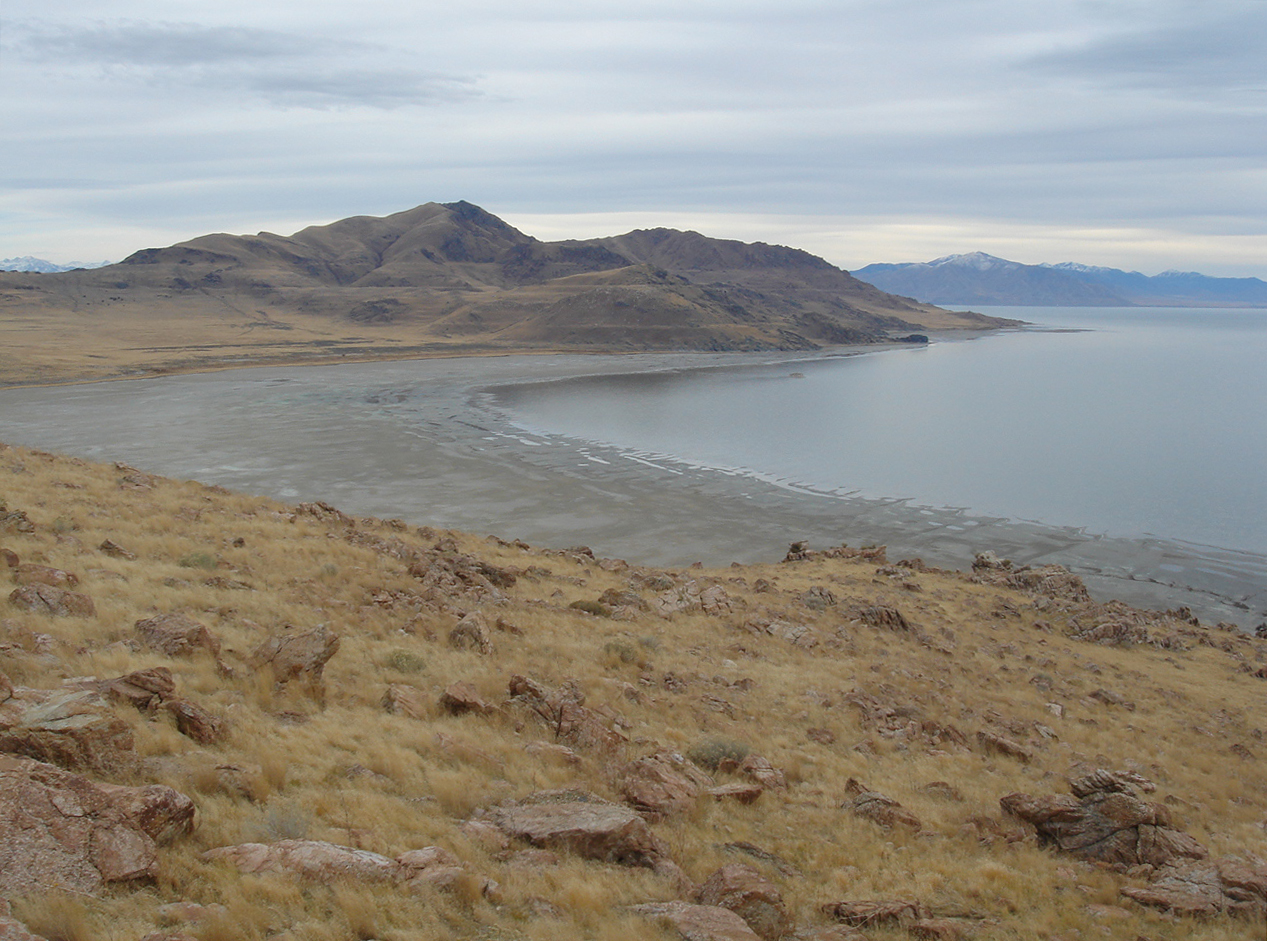
- View from Buffalo Point, Antelope Island

- Location within Utah Location within the United States
- Location: Davis County, Utah, United States
- Coordinates: 40°57′30″N 112°12′50″W
- Area: 42 sq mi (110 km^{2})
- Elevation: 4,200–6,596 ft (1,280–2,010 m)
- Established: 1969 (northern half purchase); 1981 (southern half purchase)
- Administrator: Utah State Parks
- Visitors: 116,564 (in 2025)
- Website: Official website
- Utah State Parks

Antelope Island, with an area of 42 square miles (109 km^{2}), is the largest of ten islands located within the Great Salt Lake in Utah. The island lies in the southeastern portion of the lake, near Salt Lake City and Davis County, and becomes a peninsula when the lake is at extremely low levels. It is protected as Antelope Island State Park.

The first known non-natives to visit the island were John C. Frémont and Kit Carson during exploration of the Great Salt Lake in 1845, who "rode on horseback over salt from the thickness of a wafer to twelve inches" and "were informed by the Indians that there was an abundance of fresh water on it and plenty of antelope". It is said they shot a pronghorn antelope on the island, and in gratitude for the meat, they named it Antelope Island.

Antelope Island holds populations of pronghorn, bighorn sheep, American bison, porcupine, badger, coyote, bobcat, mule deer, and millions of waterfowl. The bison were introduced to the island in 1893, and the Antelope Island bison herd has proven to be a valuable genetic pool for bison breeding and conservation purposes. The bison do well, because much of the island is covered by dry, native grassland.

The geology of Antelope Island consists mostly of alluvial plains with prairie grassland on the north, east and south of the island, along with a mountainous central area of older Precambrian metamorphic and igneous rocks and late Precambrian to Paleozoic sedimentary rocks, covered by a thin layer of Quaternary lake deposits, colluvium and alluvium. The Precambrian deposits on Antelope Island are some of the oldest rocks in the United States, older even than the Precambrian rocks at the bottom of the Grand Canyon.

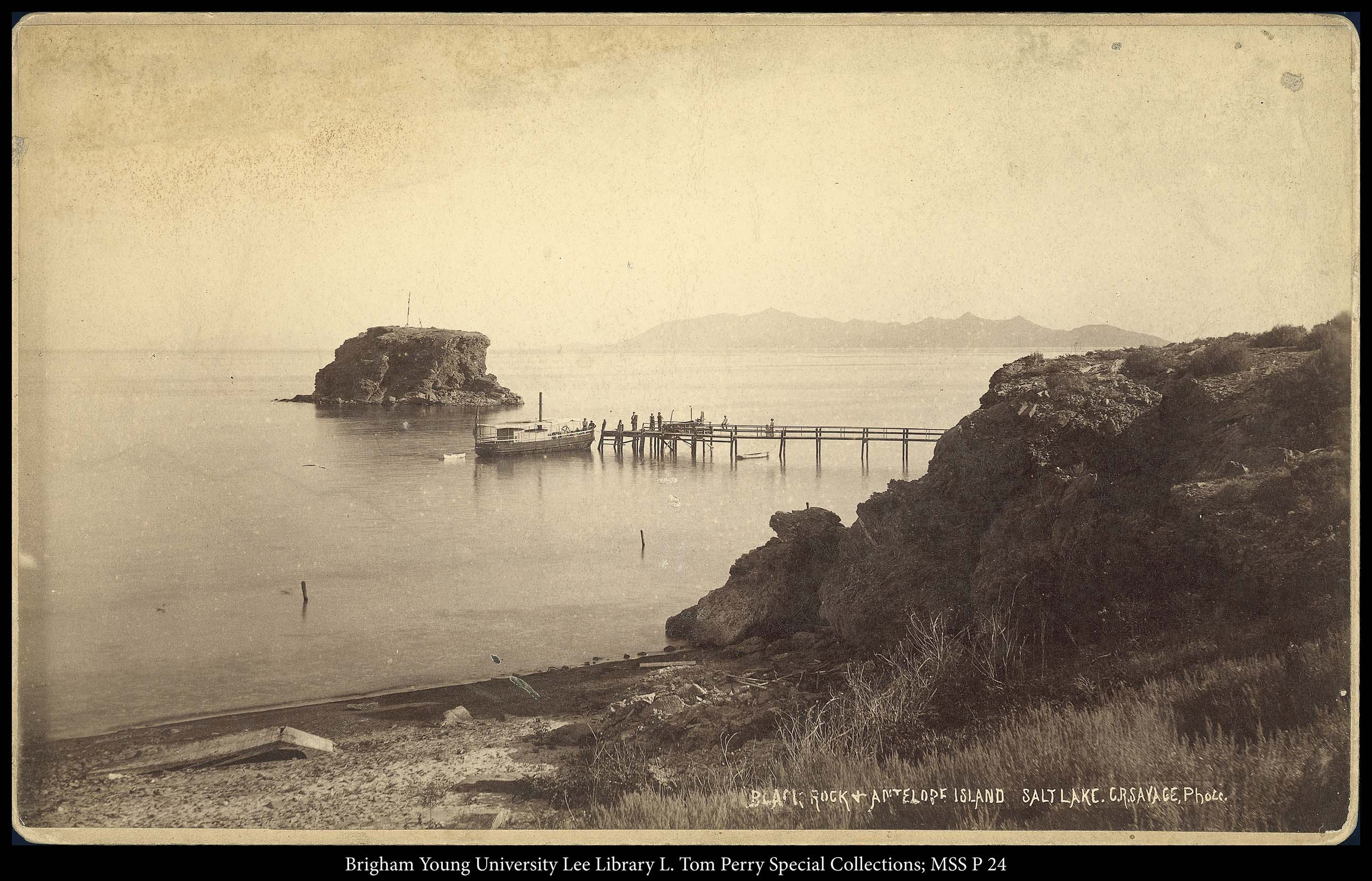
Antelope Island, c. 1875–1890. Photo by Charles Roscoe Savage.

== History ==
=== Native Americans ===
Archeological evidence dates the earliest habitation of Native Americans in Utah to about 10,000 to 12,000 years ago. Paleolithic people lived near the Great Basin's wetlands, which had an abundance of fish, birds, and small game animals. Big game, including giant bison, mammoths and ground sloths, were also attracted to the water sources. Over the years, the megafauna disappeared, while American bison, mule deer and pronghorn became more predominant.

Around 8000 BC, this population was replaced by the Desert Archaic people, who sheltered in caves near the Great Salt Lake. Relying more on gathering than the previous Utah residents, their diet was largely made of cattails and other salt tolerant plants such as pickleweed, burro weed and sedge. Red meat appears to have been a luxury. The Desert Archaic people used nets and the atlatl to hunt water fowl, small animals and pronghorns. Artifacts include nets woven with rabbit skin and plant fibers, gaming sticks, woven sandals, and animal figures made from split-twigs. About 3,500 years ago, lake levels rose and the population of Desert Archaic people appears to have dramatically decreased.

Artifacts discovered at Antelope Island State Park show that the island was occupied by prehistoric peoples more than 6,000 years ago. There are forty freshwater springs on Antelope Island. The Fielding Garr Ranch was built near the strongest and most consistent of the springs. Archaeologists have determined that human activity has taken place near these springs for at least 1,000 years.

=== Fielding Garr Ranch ===
The first Anglo-Americans to reach the island were John C. Fremont and Kit Carson. They explored Antelope Island in 1845 and named the island for the herds of grazing pronghorn. Captain Howard Stansbury used the island as a base. He mapped the lake and attempted to locate where the waters of the lake drained in an attempt to find a waterway to the Pacific Ocean. The first permanent settler on the island was Fielding Garr. Garr was sent to the island by LDS Church to establish a ranch for the "church tithing herds". The Fielding Garr Ranch was owned and operated by the church until the 1870s for the purpose of providing funds for the Perpetual Emigration Fund. This fund financed the immigration of Mormon converts from Europe to Utah. The ranch house, built in 1848, still stands and is the oldest Mormon-built home that is still on its original foundation, in Utah.

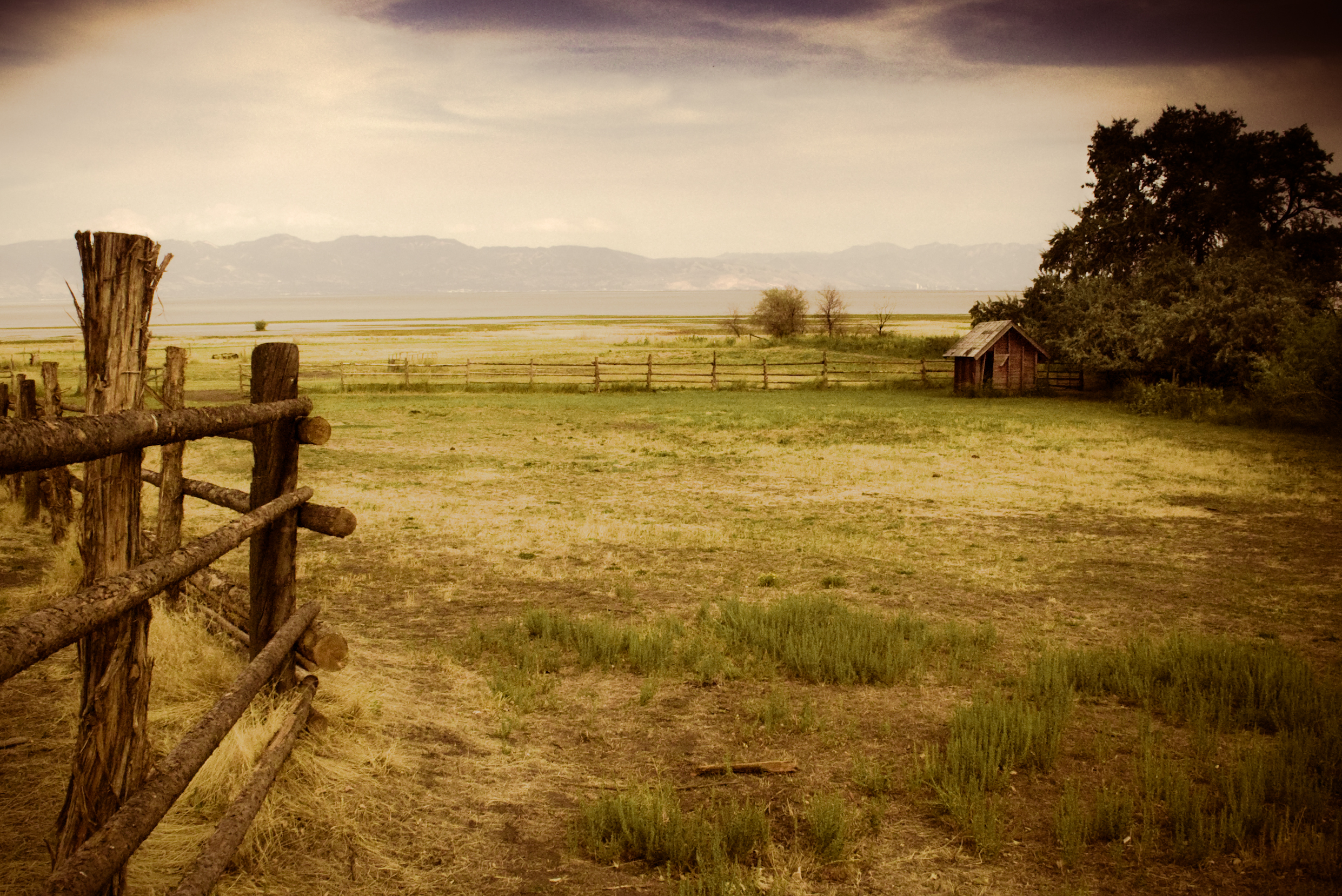
A view of the ranch

The building of the Transcontinental Railroad in 1869 opened the rest of the island to settlement by homesteaders. The first federal surveys of the island revealed that only the area surrounding the Fielding Garr Ranch had been improved. This discovery gave the federal government the authority to open the island to settlement under the Homestead Act. Settlement on the island was unsuccessful and by 1900 most of the settlers had not improved their claims and, except for the ranch, the island was free of human habitation.

John Dooly Sr. purchased the island for one million dollars and established the Island Improvement Company. Dooly is responsible for the introduction of the bison, and the foundation of the Antelope Island bison herd. He brought twelve bison to the island. Four bulls, four cows, and four calves were transported by boat on February 15, 1893. At the time there were fewer than 1,000 head of bison in all of North America. Historians speculate that Dooly introduced the herd to the island for commercial purposes with the idea of establishing a rare opportunity for hunters to take the nearly extinct American bison. The twelve bison became the foundation of the Antelope Island bison herd that numbers between 500 and 700 animals, making it one of the largest and oldest publicly owned American bison herds in the United States.

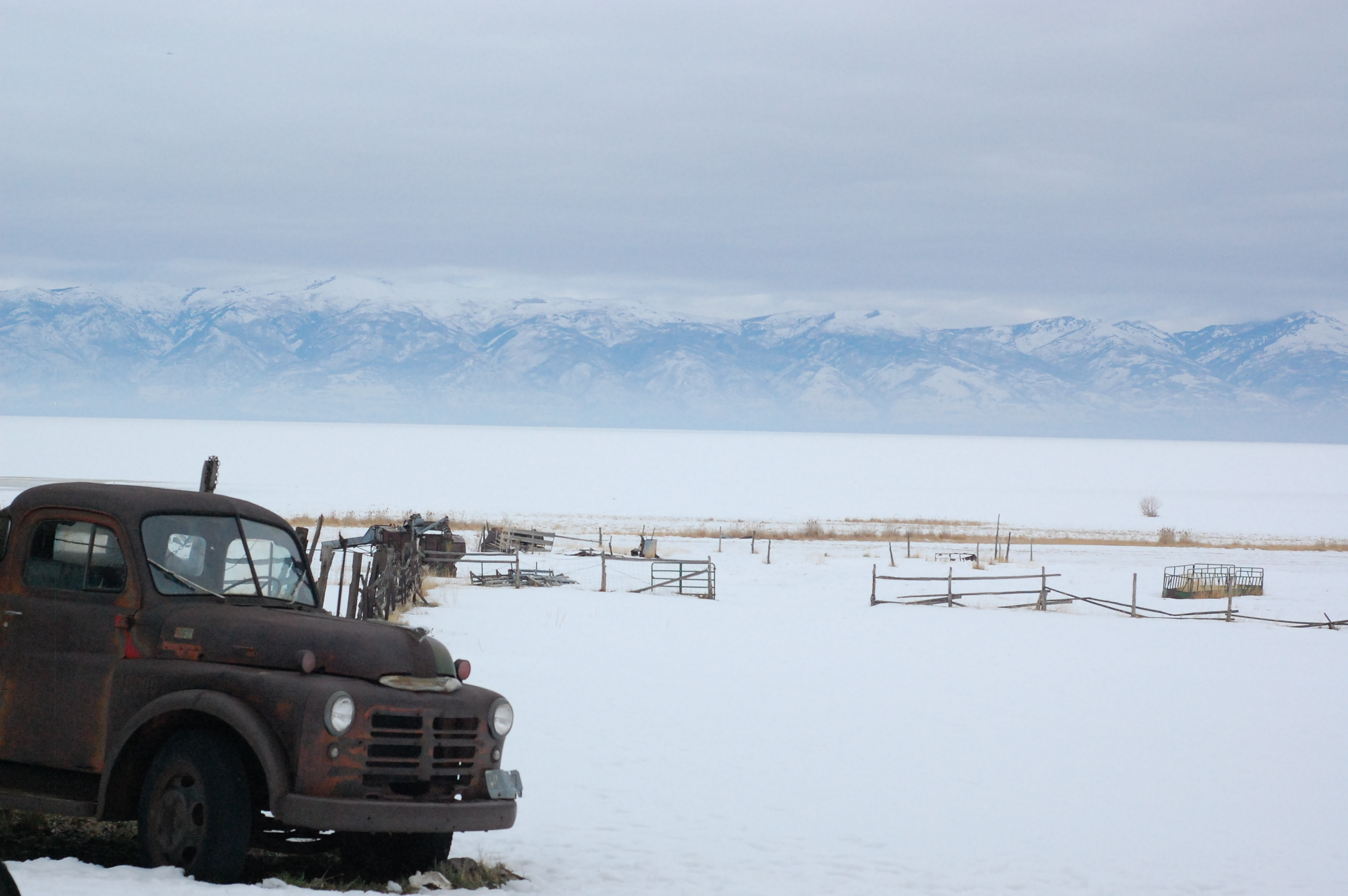
An old Dodge pick up truck is a reminder of the days when Antelope Island State Park was an active ranch.

John Dooly Jr. assumed responsibility for the day-to-day operation of the ranch in about 1902. He focused on raising sheep. The Fielding Garr Ranch became one of the most industrialized and largest sheep ranching operations in the western United States. A failing wool market in the 1950s caused a shift in focus on the ranch. Sheep were dropped in favor of cattle. The cattle ranch worked as one of the largest cattle operations in Utah until 1984 when the ranch was sold to the state to go with 2,000 acres (810 ha) of the island that had been purchased by the state in 1969. The last herds of cattle were removed from the island in 1984 after an extremely snowy winter that caused the death by starvation of about 350 heifers and calves. The meltwater from the heavy snows flooded the causeway, limiting access to the island. Ranchers resorted to hiring barges and making multiple trips from shore to island to salvage their stock.

=== Protected status ===
The process of changing Antelope Island from a privately owned ranch to a state park took many years. During the early 20th century there was talk of the island being acquired by the federal government for the establishment of a national park.

A. H. Leonard purchased the herd of bison from the Dooly family in 1926. Leonard intended to sell the herd to zoos. He found it impossible to get the bison off the island due to the water level and the drafts and sizes of the boats that were available to him. At this point he offered to sell the herd to the federal government if a national park were to be established on the island. Time magazine cites "Congressional apathy" as being the reason the island and bison herd were not protected.

Senator Frank E. Moss of Utah asked the National Park Service consider the Great Salt Lake for inclusion in the National Park System in 1959. The study had high praise for Antelope Island as a potential national park, but found "little else worthwhile about the Great Salt Lake". The National Park Service was concerned with a lack of planning by the State of Utah and the fact that the lake was used as a dumping site for municipal and industrial waste. The Park Service was impressed by the scenic and recreational possibilities of the northern end of Antelope Island, describing it as the "most impressive site of the lake." The qualities of the island were not enough to persuade the park service to seek the creation of a national park encompassing the Great Salt Lake. The park service cited years of "mismanagement, apathy, and lack of any coordinated plan for its proper development." Sewage from Salt Lake City that was being dumped untreated into the lake at the time and waste from a smelting facility on the southern end of the lake were two of the greatest sources of pollution. The Park Service did express interest in safeguarding the lake since it is a remnant of the Pleistocene. The Park Service also noted a lack of recreation on the lake and an inaction by the state to positively respond to an earlier request for the formation of a state park.

In 1971 the directors of the Golden Spike Empire, Inc., a local civic group that sought to promote the Great Salt Lake area as a tourist destination, recommended that all of Antelope Island be purchased. The group encouraged the development of the state park on the northern end of the island. GSE encouraged the establishment of a national monument on the remainder of the island. Davis County commissioners were against the establishment of a national monument citing the "look but don't touch" rules of national monuments. The local government was in favor of the state park and encouraged its development as a means of attracting tourists and increasing county revenues.

The Fielding Garr Ranch was purchased by the state in 1982 at a cost of $4.5 million. Access to the park was limited to a causeway on the southern end of the park at Saltair that was built in the 1950s until a northern causeway was completed in 1969. The park hosted a "moderate number" of visitors during the 1960s and 1970s. Visitation came to a stop in 1983 when floodwaters washed out both causeways. Cars did not return to the park until 1993 when the northern causeway was re-opened.

== Natural history ==
=== Great Salt Lake ===
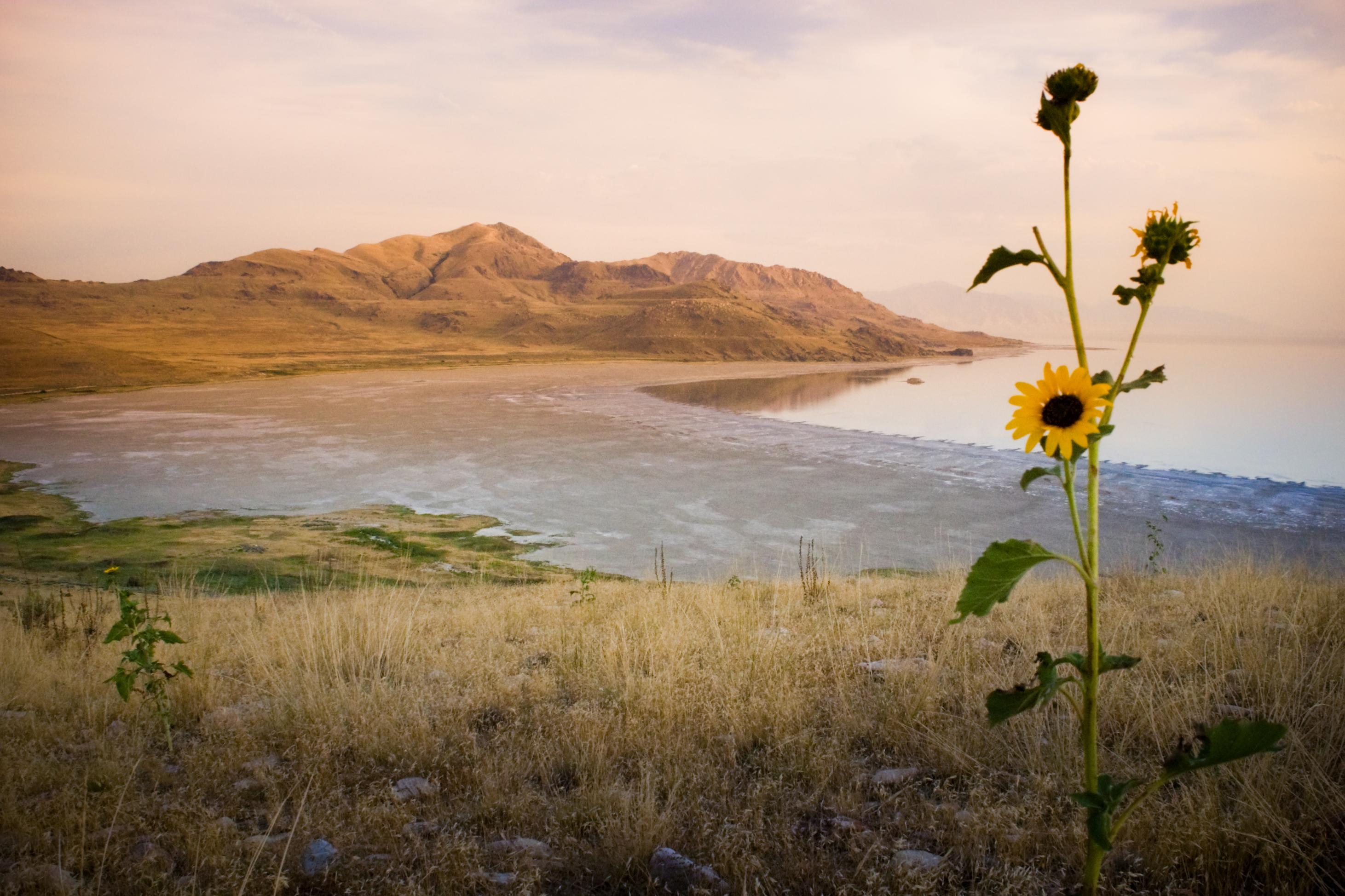
Looking south towards White Rock Bay

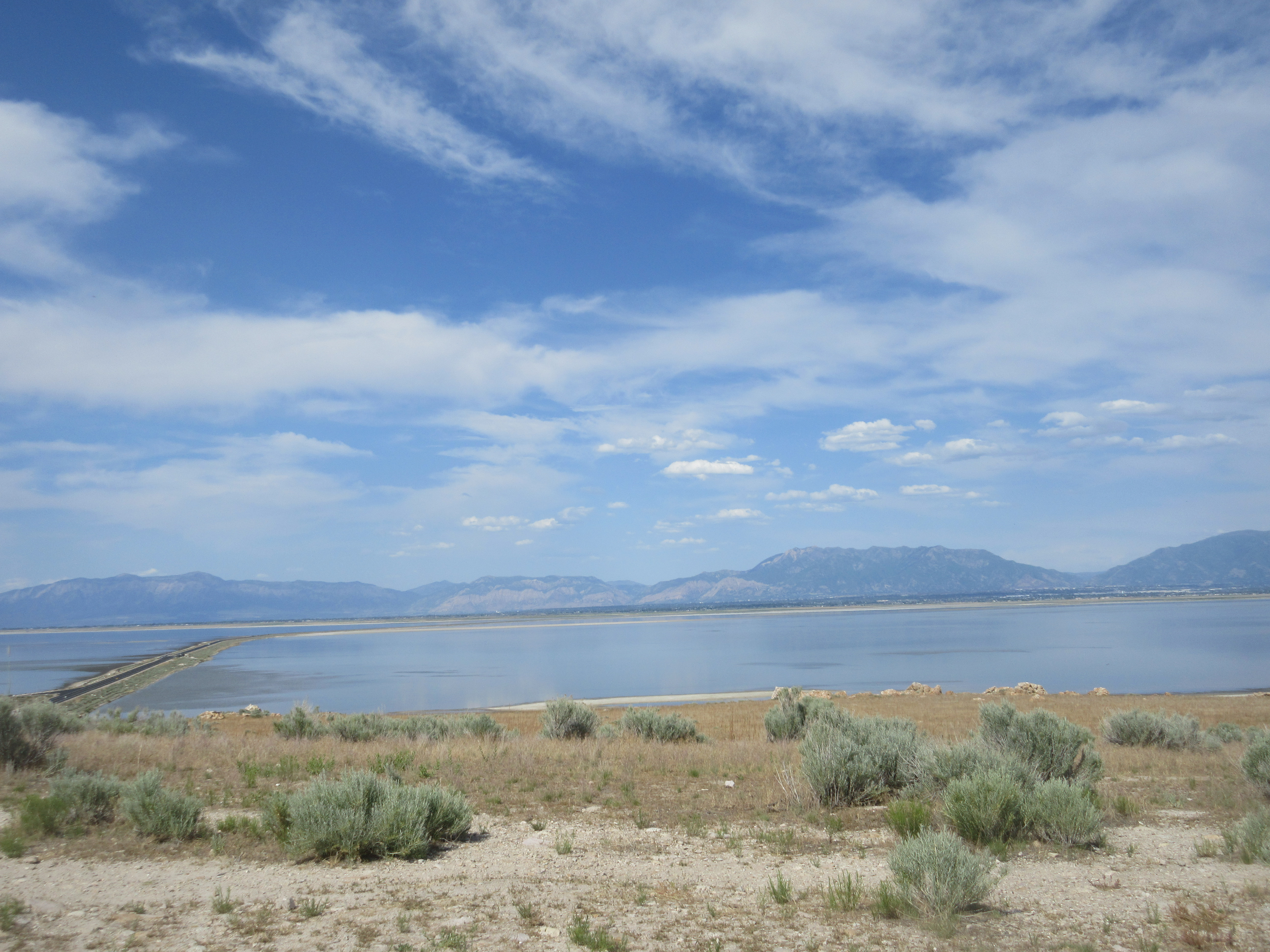
View of Buffalo Bay and the causeway to the mainland

Antelope Island State Park is surrounded by the Great Salt Lake. The lake is the last remaining part of a vast inland Pleistocene sea, Lake Bonneville. At more than 1,000 feet (305 m) deep and more than 19,691 square miles (51,000 km^{2}) in area, the lake was nearly as large as Lake Michigan and significantly deeper. With the change in climate, the lake began drying up, leaving Great Salt Lake, Utah Lake, Sevier Lake, and Rush Lake as remnants. As Lake Bonneville receded it left behind the Great Basin, which is made of narrow mountain ranges and broad valleys, known locally as basins. The Great Salt Lake is endorheic and has very high salinity, far saltier than sea water. The Jordan, Weber, and Bear rivers deposit around 1.1 million tons of minerals in the lake each year. Due to its high salt concentration, most people can easily float in the lake as a result of the high density of the water. The Great Salt Lake is the fourth-largest terminal lake in the world, In an average year the lake covers an area of approximately 1,700 square miles (4,400 km^{2}), but the lake's size fluctuates due to low water levels. For example, in 1963 it reached its lowest recorded level at 950 square miles (2,460 km^{2}), but in 1987 the surface area was at the historic high of 3,300 square miles (8,500 km^{2}). Great Salt Lake does not support fish, but does support large numbers of brine shrimp and brine flies which provide food for visiting waterfowl. Because of the high salinity, the island is mostly without readily available fresh water.

=== Geology ===
Antelope Island is 28,022 acres (11,340 ha) and is 15 miles (24 km) long and 4.5 miles (7.2 km) at its widest point. The island is in the midst of the Great Basin between the Wasatch and Sierra Nevada mountain ranges. The highest point on the island is Frary Peak at 6,589 feet (2,008 m) above sea level. It is one of eight important islands in the lake. The others are Badger, Bird, Dolphin, Gunnison, Carrington, Stansbury and Fremont. Two of the major islands, Gunnison and Bird, and two minor islands, Egg and White Rock are rookeries and as such are protected. Visitor access is not permitted on the protected islands.

The rocks in and around the Fielding Garr Ranch are some of the oldest rocks in the United States. At 2.7 billion years old, they are older than the rocks in the bottom of the Grand Canyon. Tintic quartzite is found on the northern third of the island. It is about 550 million years old. Tufa rocks on the island are some of the youngest rocks in the United States. They were deposited as Lake Bonneville receded between 10,000 and 15,000 years ago. The tufa rocks resemble concrete and are in the vicinity of Buffalo Point.

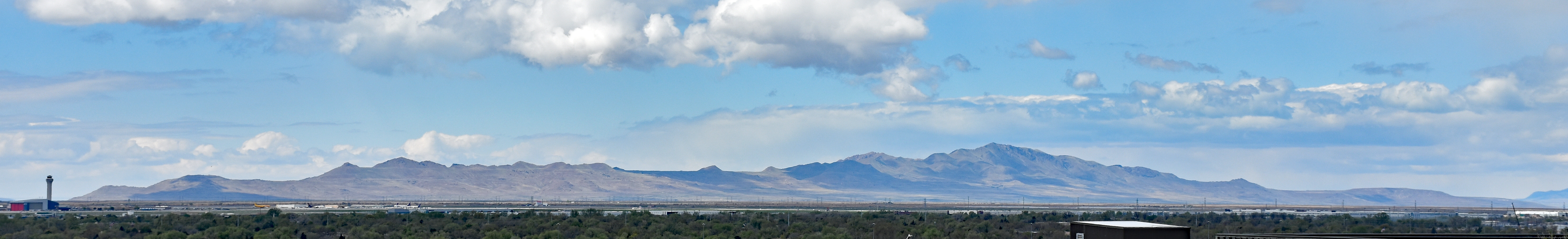
The entire length of the island, as seen from the LDS Conference Center roof in downtown Salt Lake City

== State park ==
Antelope Island State Park was established in 1969 as Great Salt Lake State Park following the state's acquisition of 2,000 acres on the north end of the island. At the time the facilities at the park were minimal. Temporary shower facilities were constructed and available for a "long weekend" over the Memorial Day weekend of 1969. Boating facilities were also available on a limited basis.

Antelope Island State Park is a Utah state park and the entire island is included in the park. Early in the 20th century, because of its wildlife and scenery, some suggested that Antelope Island should become a national park, but the movement never came to fruition. When the Utah State Parks System was created, proposals were made to turn Antelope Island into Antelope Island State Park and the proposal gradually gathered public support, but Antelope Island was privately owned at the time. Originally, Antelope Island was used as a ranch for cattle and sheep, starting from the earliest days of the arrival of the Mormon pioneers into the Salt Lake Valley. The Church of Jesus Christ of Latter-day Saints (Mormons) controlled the ranch on the island from 1848 until approximately 1870. The island was purchased in 1870 by John Dooly Sr., and he established the Island Improvement Company, which managed the island and ranches from 1884 until 1981. The State of Utah purchased the northern part of the island 2,000 acres (8.1 km^{2}) in 1969, and acquired the remainder in 1981 when the state purchased the historical Fielding Garr Ranch. Subsequently, the cattle and sheep were removed. Antelope Island State Park was established in 1981 as part of the Utah State Parks System.

The island is accessible via a 7-mile causeway from Syracuse in Davis County. Access from Interstate 15 is via exit 332, then west along Antelope Drive (SR-108). The island's shore (all but west side of the island) is mostly flat with beaches and plains to the base of the mountains on the island. These steep mountains are visible from most of the northern Wasatch Front, reaching a maximum elevation of 6,596 feet (2,010 m), which is about 2,396 feet (730 m) above the level of the lake.

Antelope Island State Park operates a 10-watt travelers' information station on 530 kHz AM. The transmitter is on the south side of the causeway near the island. This station can be heard in Ogden and as far south as Salt Lake City. It carries information about the park's hours of operation & promotes upcoming events that the state park coordinates.

=== Wildlife ===
Antelope Island State Park provides a habitat for a wide variety of wildlife. Despite its name, the park is most famous for its herd of bison. The size of the Antelope Island bison herd ranges from 550 to 700 animals and is controlled by an annual bison round-up. The Antelope Island bison herd is one of the oldest and largest in the United States. The park is also home to jackrabbits, pronghorn, bobcats, mule deer, coyotes, and several species of rodents. The island and Great Salt Lake attract migrating birds. The inland grasslands on the island provide habitat for chukars, burrowing owls, long-billed curlews and several species of birds of prey.

==== Bison ====
John Dooly, owner of the island in 1893, with the help of William Glassman brought a herd of twelve bison to Antelope Island. At the time American bison were nearly extinct in North America, having suffered years of over hunting and extermination during the settlement of the American West. Biologists estimate that as many as 60 million bison roamed the western United States prior to the lands being settled by Anglo Americans. These bison once inhabited the grasslands of North America in massive herds; their range stretched across most of what is now the United States, from Florida and New York in the east and south to the Texas/Mexico border and the Yukon Territory in Canada to the south and north and all the way west to the Pacific Coast. The bison were an important resource for the native tribes of the western United States. The United States government knew this and began a campaign to rid the plains of the bison, thereby depriving the Native Americans of their most prized natural resource and making them dependent on handouts from the government. Without the bison the Native Americans were forced to "seek peace". Some conservationists saw that destroying the bison population was detrimental to the future of the nation and in 1874 Congress voted to stop the government sponsored slaughter. By the 1890s approximately 800 bison remained.

Dooly purchased the bison after Glassman had failed to establish a bison preserve on the south shore of the Great Salt Lake. Glassman had hope to attract tourists to the area with some of the few remaining bison in the United States at the time. His venture failed and he was forced to sell some of the herd at auction. Dooly bought the bison with the intention of supplementing his income with private bison hunts. At approximately the same time a herd of elk was brought to the island. The elk did not last very long due to the island being a poor habitat for elk. In 1993, 17 elk were reintroduced to the island with negative results; three drowned, three were never found, the remaining eleven survived. However, due to the lack of a natural predator, the gray wolf, the bison thrived on the island and the herd rapidly increased in size.

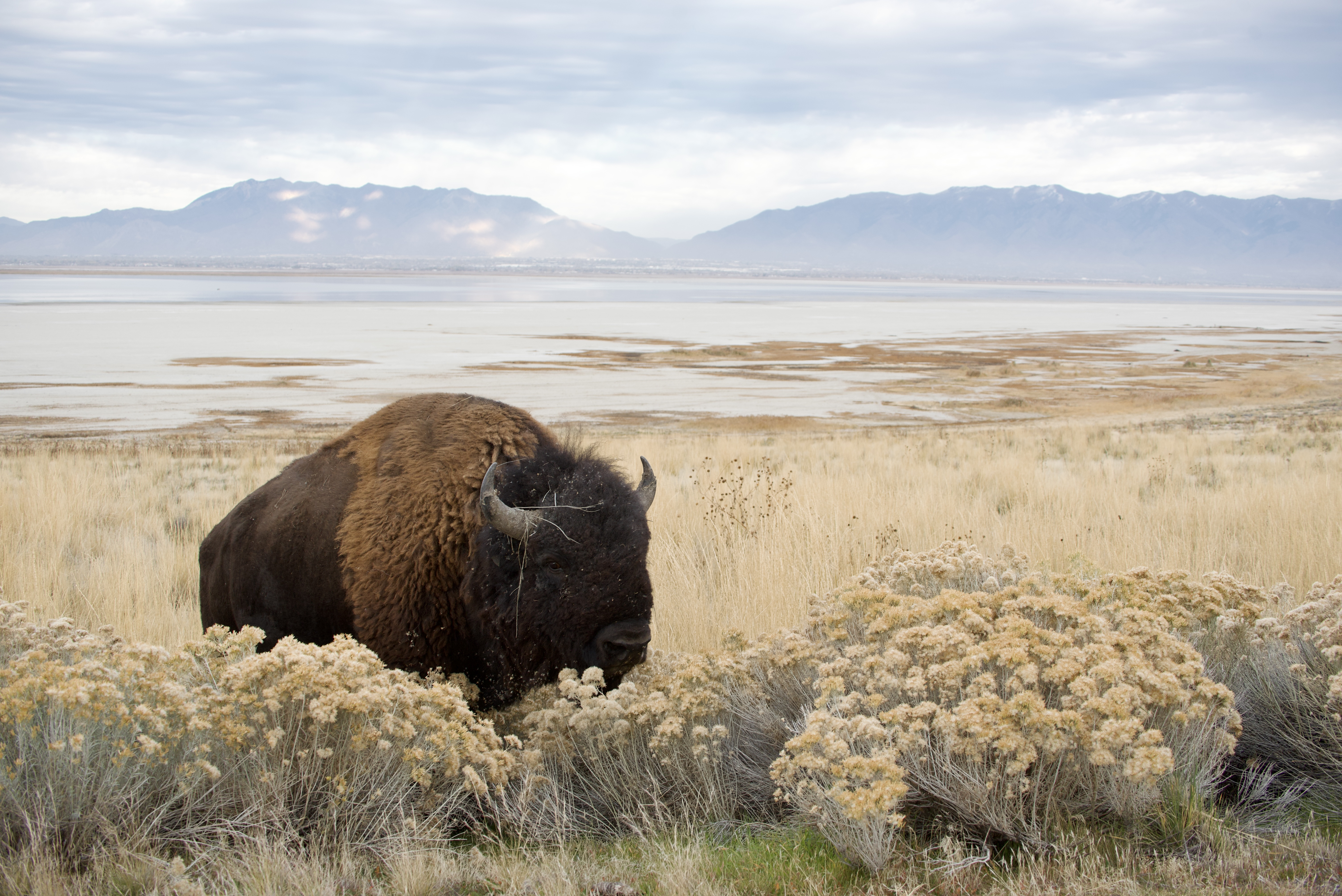
One of the many bison found on Antelope Island

The island was opened for bison hunts beginning in 1896. The hunting of bison on the island was limited to those who could afford the $200 requested by Dooly and his ancestors. Heavyweight boxing champion Jack Dempsey and 1920s sports writer Robert Edgren were just two of the celebrities that came to the island to shoot a bison. Bison hunting continued on the island until 1926 when the final "Big Buffalo Hunt" eliminated all but a few of the bison. Public sentiment changed during the 1920s and activists began to call for the protection of the herd on Antelope Island.

A silent film produced by Paramount Pictures, The Covered Wagon (1923), was partly filmed on Antelope Island when buffalo hunt and buffalo stampede scenes were needed. At the time, the bison herd on Antelope Island was possibly the largest herd of bison in the United States. After much effort, about 350 of the animals were herded into a stampede, which was then filmed under the direction of James Cruze. The movie is considered by some people to be the first great Western epic and it established some of the tropes that persist in Western movies, such as circling the wagons in time of danger or attacks. During filming of the movie, seven buffalo were shot and killed for the hunting scenes. "Don't grow sentimental over the seven", said Cruze, the director of the film. "The folks out there would like to get rid of the whole herd and they would, but for the sentimental hubbub that is always raised when they talk of rounding out the buffalo. The animals are worthless — there isn't worse meat on Earth to eat — and they ruin the whole territory for cattle grazing purposes. So the buffalo remain — sentimental reminders of the America of the past."

The hunt of 1926 was covered by Time magazine. A herd of approximately 300-400 bison was culled to about 50 by a large group of hunters on horseback with modern rifles. John Dooly had sold the herd to A. H. Leonard in 1924. Leonard intended to sell the bison to zoos, but was not able to corral them. He next tried to offer the island and the Antelope Island bison herd to the United States Department of the Interior. Leonard had hoped that a national park would be established on the island therefore preserving the herd. Time cites "Congressional apathy" for the lack of a land transfer. Leonard was once again forced to change his business plan. This time he wanted to expand the cattle ranching on the island and to do this the number of bison needed to be reduced. Leonard announced that a hunt would be held in the fall of 1926. The hunt took place in November, but not without protests from around the nation. The New York World and other newspapers of the day tried to arouse public sentiment against the hunt. Utah Governor George Dern received formal protests of the hunt from the American Humane Society, Massachusetts Governor Alvan T. Fuller and Boston Mayor Malcolm Nichols. Governor Dern declined to prevent the hunt stating, "Antelope Island and the buffalo herd are privately owned." The hunt took place with noted participants Ralph and Edward Ammerman of Scranton, Pennsylvania, and big game hunter J. O. Beebe of Omaha, Nebraska.

The Antelope Island bison herd and the island remained in private hands until 1969 when the northern 2,000 acres (810 ha) of the island were purchased by the state of Utah. The southern end of the island was acquired in 1981, granting the entire herd protected status on Antelope Island State Park. In 1986, park rangers saw the need to begin controlling the bison population to prevent overgrazing and disease. The first roundup was held in 1987 and it has since become an annual event that brings in revenue by way of the sale of excess bison and tourist dollars brought in by spectators. Every year, in late October, all the bison on the island are herded to a central area in a "Great Buffalo Roundup" and sent briefly into pens where they are examined, weighed and vaccinated, whereupon decisions are made on culling and selecting breeding stock. The majority of the bison are then released within a few days, and are again allowed to roam free on the island. The Antelope Island bison herd fluctuates in size between 550 and 700 head, and is one of the largest publicly owned bison herds in the nation. The reason for the variability of the size of the herd is that the bison produce approximately 150 to 200 calves annually, and since this is prime prairie habitat for bison, with no significant predators, the herd can increase by up to half every year. It has been determined that 700 head is near the maximum preferred carrying capacity for bison on the island, so the excess bison need to be culled. Bison from this island are often sent to other herd locations around North America due to their genetic isolation, some unique genetic markers contained in the population, and because of their disease-free condition. Some bison are also purchased at the pen site in a yearly public auction, and are taken as meat or breeding stock for commercial farms in other parts of the world.

In 2020, the podcast This is Love released an episode featuring Antelope Island and two bison attacks that took place there.

==== Bighorn sheep ====
Bighorn sheep were introduced to Antelope Island State Park in the late 1990s. The herd on the island was gathered from herds in Nevada and British Columbia. Biologists at the park and with the state of Utah felt that Antelope Island would be an "ideal oasis" for establishing a "nursery herd" of bighorn. The sheep are protected from human threats on the island and can be used to reintroduce the bighorn in areas throughout western North America. The target population for the herd on the island is about 125–150 head. When the numbers are greater than 150 the excess sheep are gathered and sent to new homes.

The nursery herd has largely been a success. The herd is thriving and it is providing the needed animals to re-establish or strengthen herds of bighorn sheep elsewhere. There are some problems. One is the lack of natural predators on the island. There are no cougars on the island and the sheep that grow up on Antelope Island grow up without an "innate fear" of their primary predators on the lands away from the island. Another problem with moving the sheep is the financial cost of moving them off the island. It can cost up to $1,000 per animal. The sheep are moved by helicopter from the island and then by truck to their final destination. Also the sheep undergo a tremendous amount of stress with the move and biologists liken moving an animal from one place to another with transplanting organs in humans. The bighorn are placed on public and private lands with the help of the Foundation for North American Wild Sheep. The foundation buys grazing permits from domestic sheep ranchers. In exchange for the grazing rights the ranchers agree to remove their domestic herds.

In 2018 a mysterious respiratory ailment felled most of the island's sheep. The remaining sheep were shot in 2019 in order to prepare the island for repopulation. On January 29, 2020, 25 bighorn sheep were relocated from Montana's Rocky Boy Reservation in order to restore the population. In October 2022, 27 more bighorn sheep were relocated to Antelope Island from the Morenci-Clifton area in Arizona. The new sheep will provide more genetic diversity to the Antelope Island herd. The eventual management goal of the island is 125 sheep.

Other mammals found on the island include mule deer (estimated to number 250), pronghorn antelope (approximately 200 on the island), bighorn sheep (estimated 200), coyotes, bobcats, badgers, porcupines, cottontail rabbits, jackrabbits, and several species of ground squirrels and other rodents.

==== Birds ====
The wetlands surrounding the Great Salt Lake account for nearly 80% of the wetlands in Utah. The lake and surrounding wetlands are home to over 250 species of birds and form a stop over on the Pacific Flyway between South and North America. Between four and six million birds nest and feed on the lake every year. The world's largest populations of white-faced ibis and California gulls make their homes near the lake. A large population of black-necked stilts, American avocets and newborn pelicans are also found on and near the Great Salt Lake. Many of the birds come to Antelope Island State Park to feed on the abundant quantities of brine flies and brine shrimp.

The two most popular places for bird watching on the island are at the causeway and near the Fielding Garr Ranch. Along the shoreline of the island, mallard, Canada goose, avocets, black-necked stilts, willets, long-billed curlews, sanderlings, American white pelicans, pied-billed grebes, killdeer, great blue herons, snowy egrets, white-faced ibis and many migratory birds can be observed.

The island grasslands provide habitat for ring-necked pheasants, California quail, burrowing owls, chukar partridges, rock doves, mourning doves, horned larks, red-winged blackbirds and many other species, plus several species of raptors. Bald eagles, golden eagles, prairie falcons, peregrine falcons, northern harriers, American kestrels, great horned owls, barn owls, ospreys and red-tailed hawks are some of the species of raptors that can occur on the island.

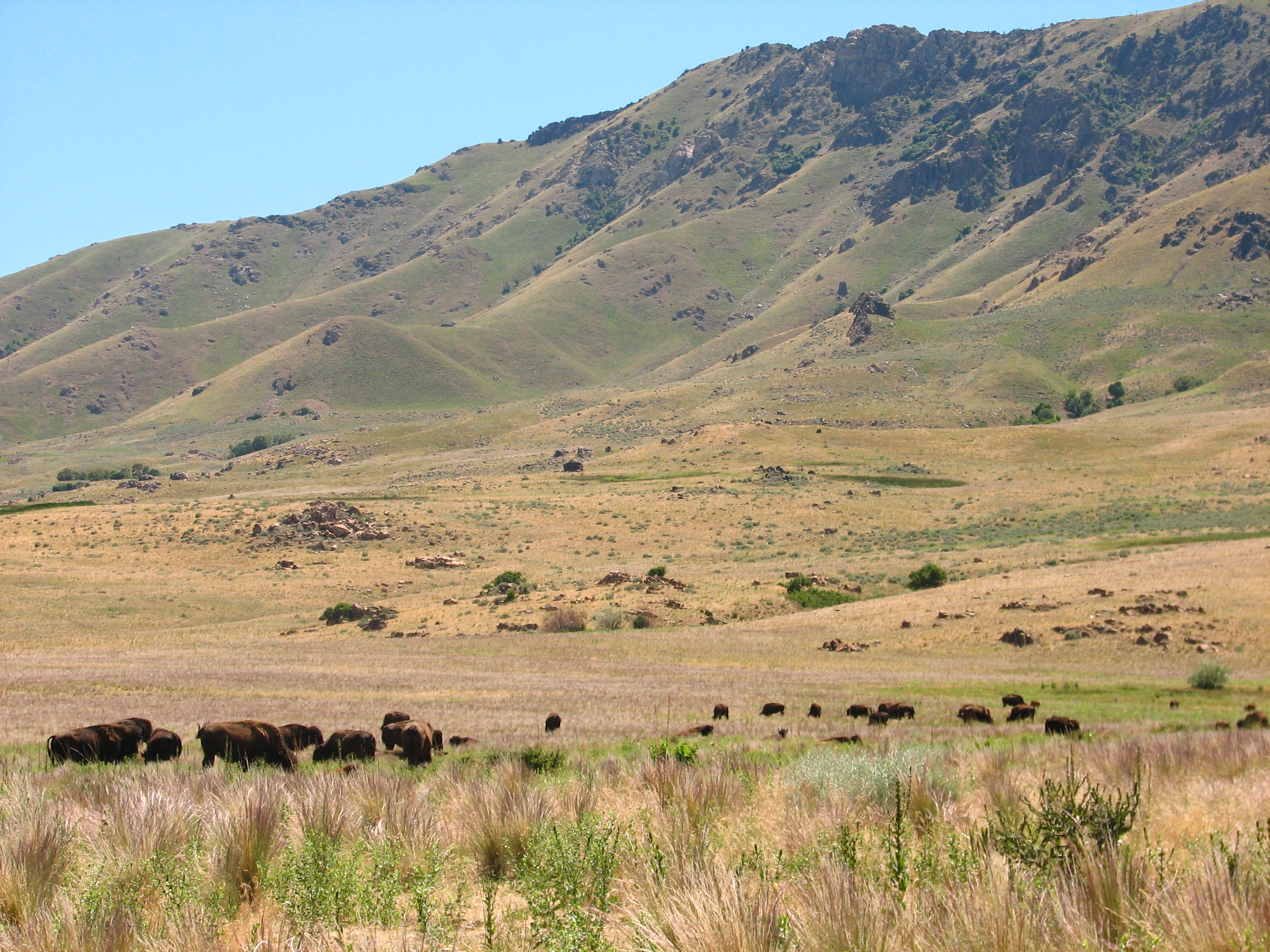
A herd of bison on Antelope Island

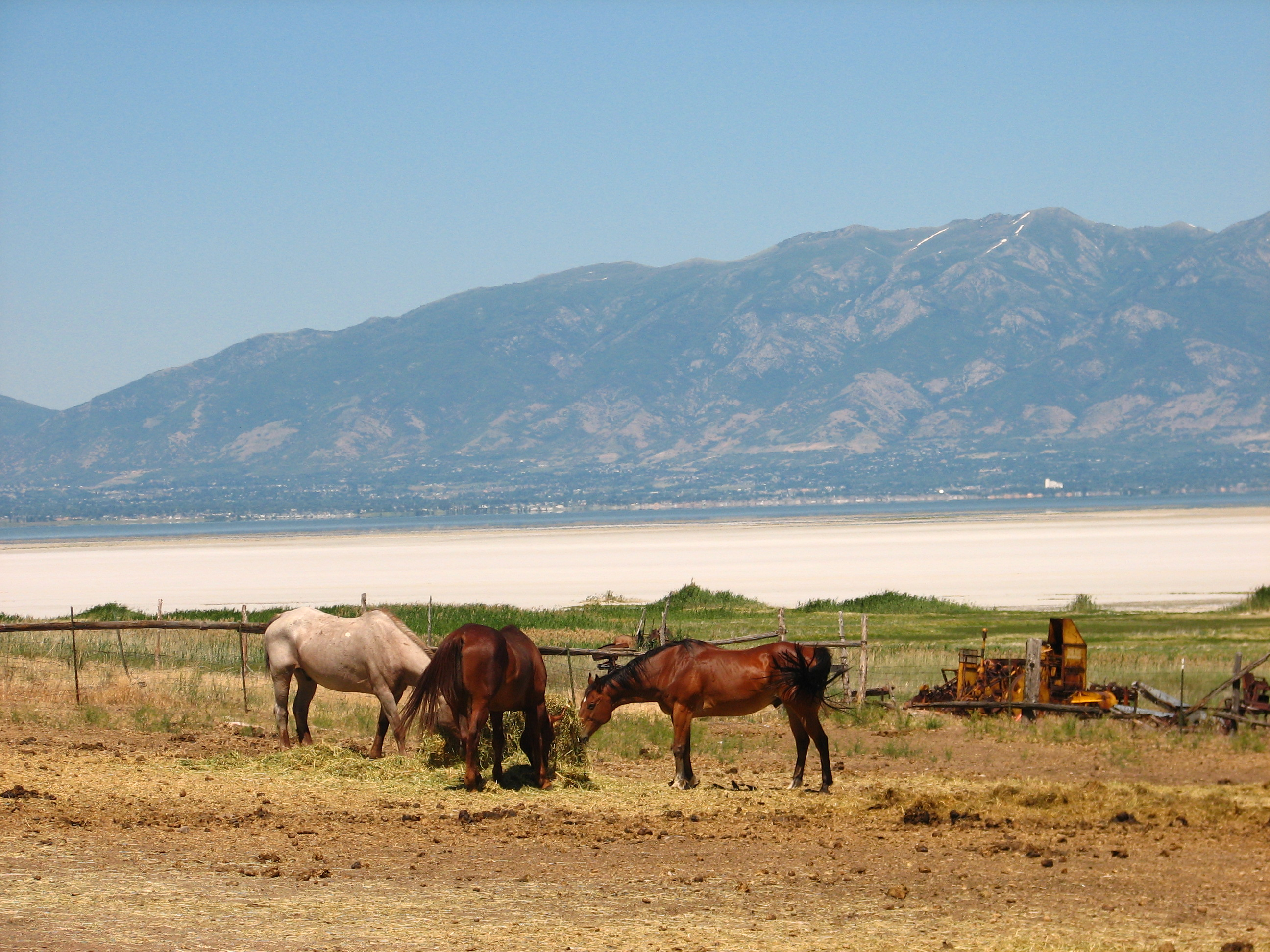
Fielding Garr Ranch on Antelope Island

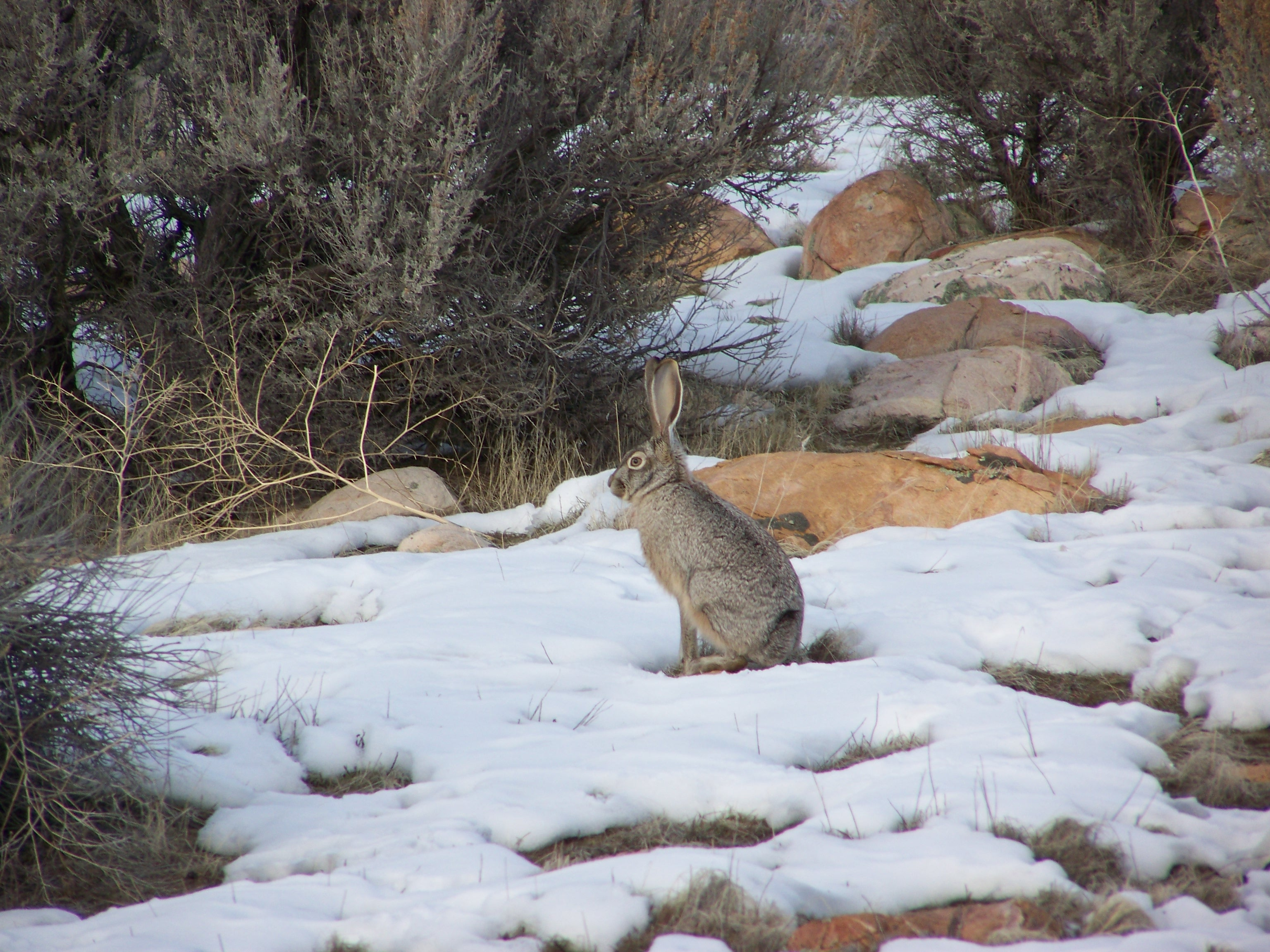
Jackrabbit in Antelope Island State Park

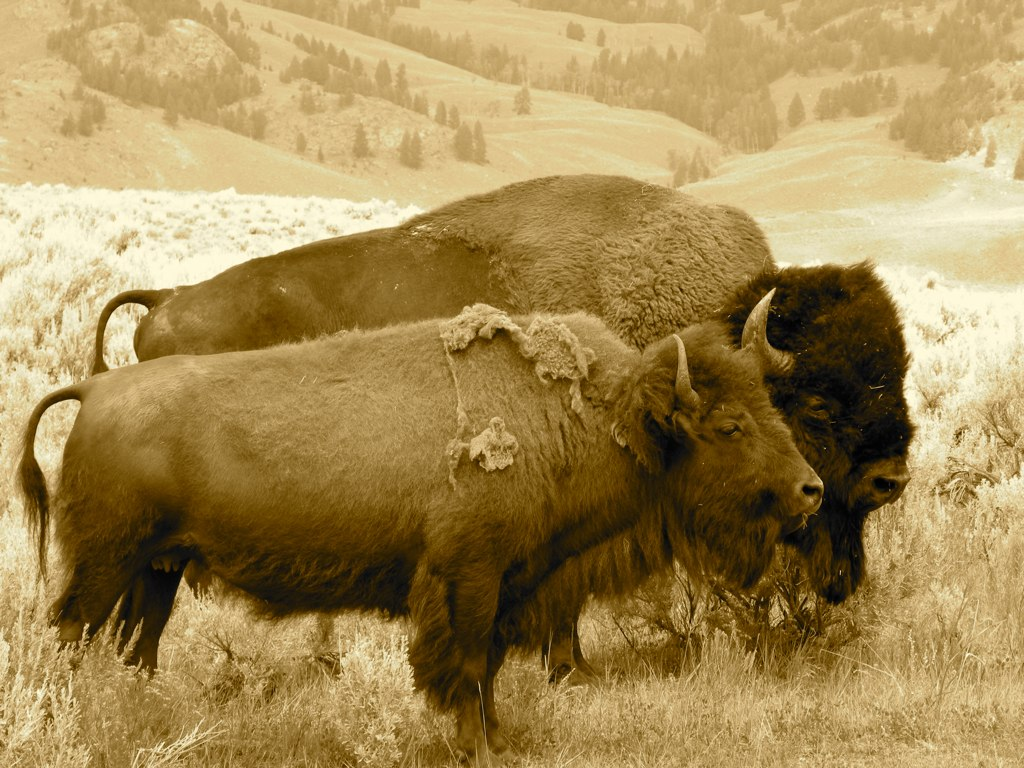
Bison pair

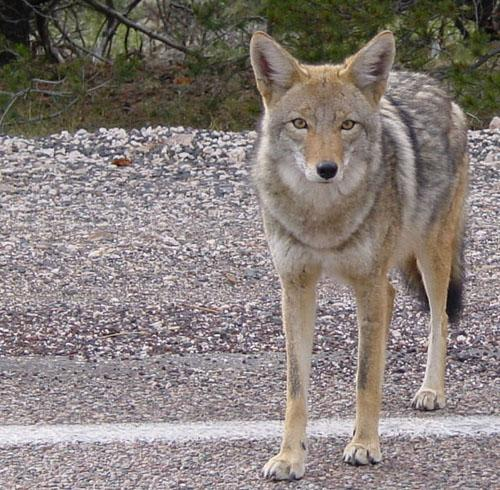
Coyote

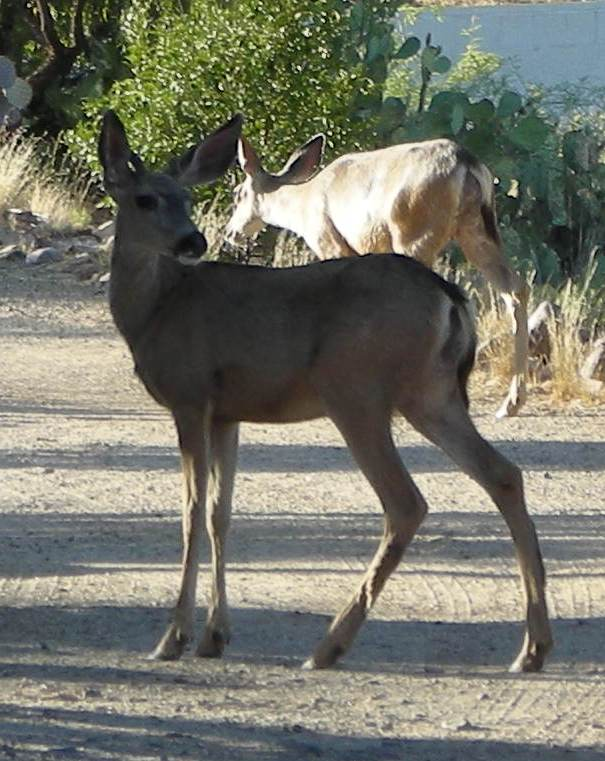
Mule deer

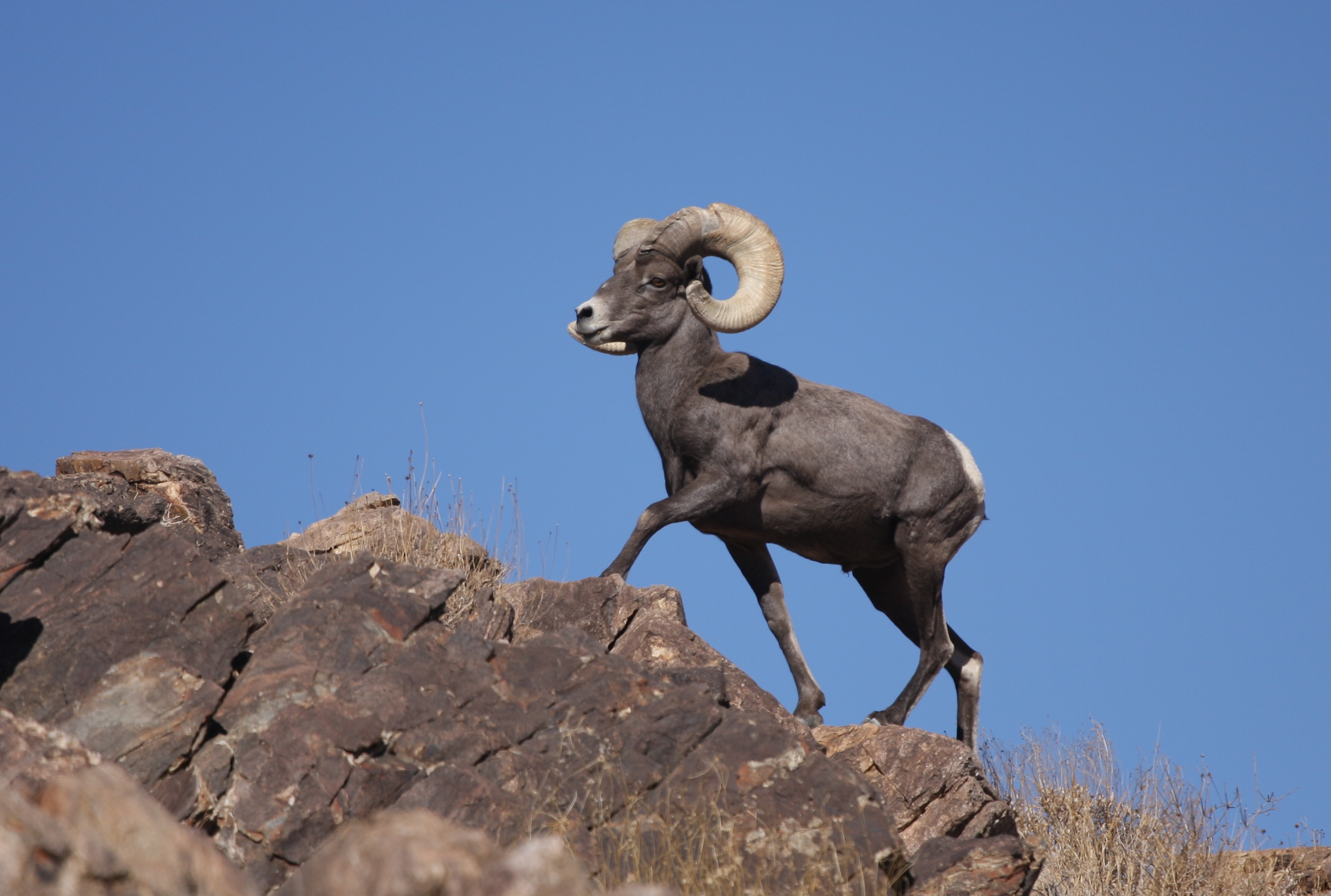
Bighorn sheep

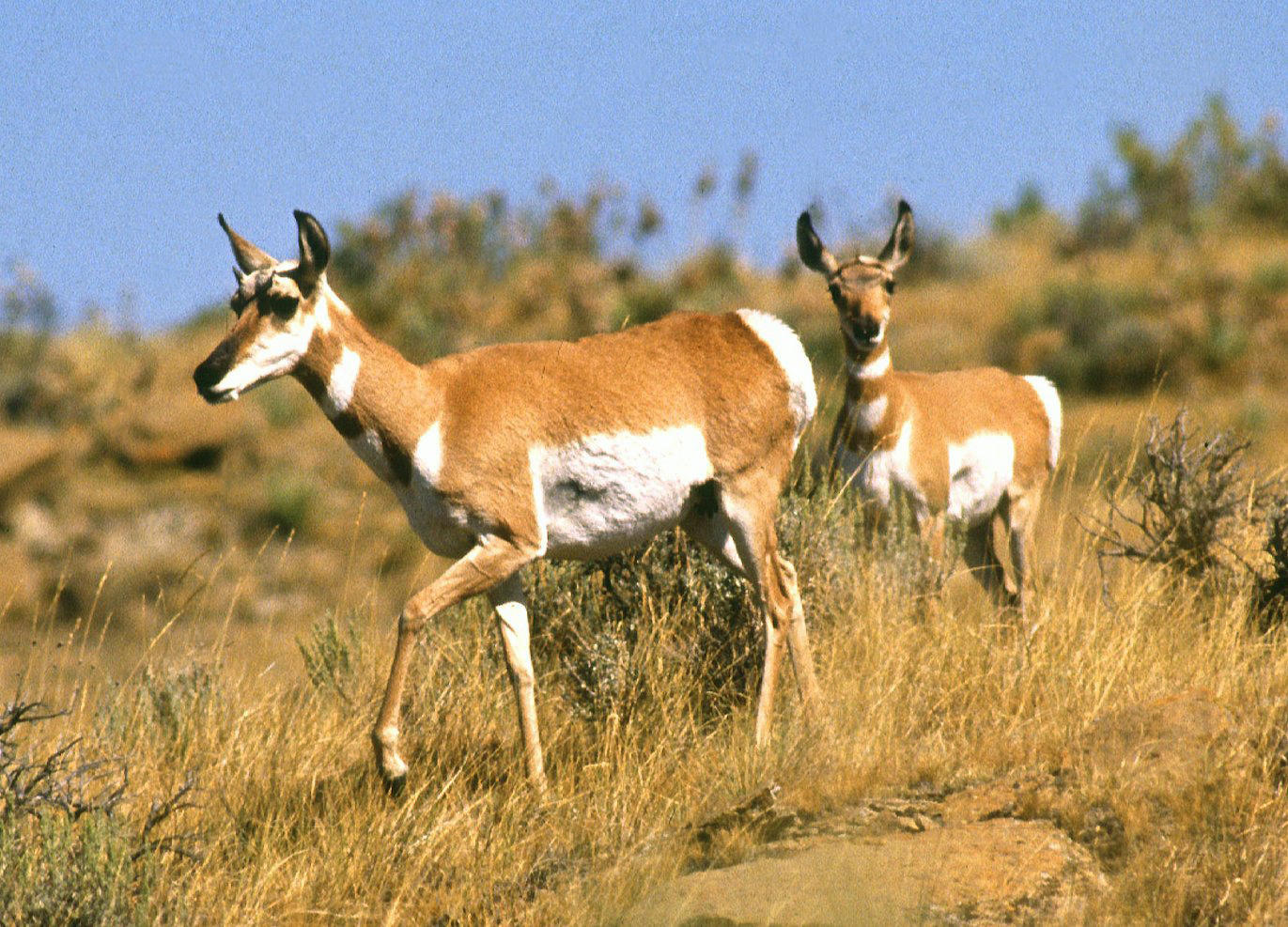
Pronghorn antelope

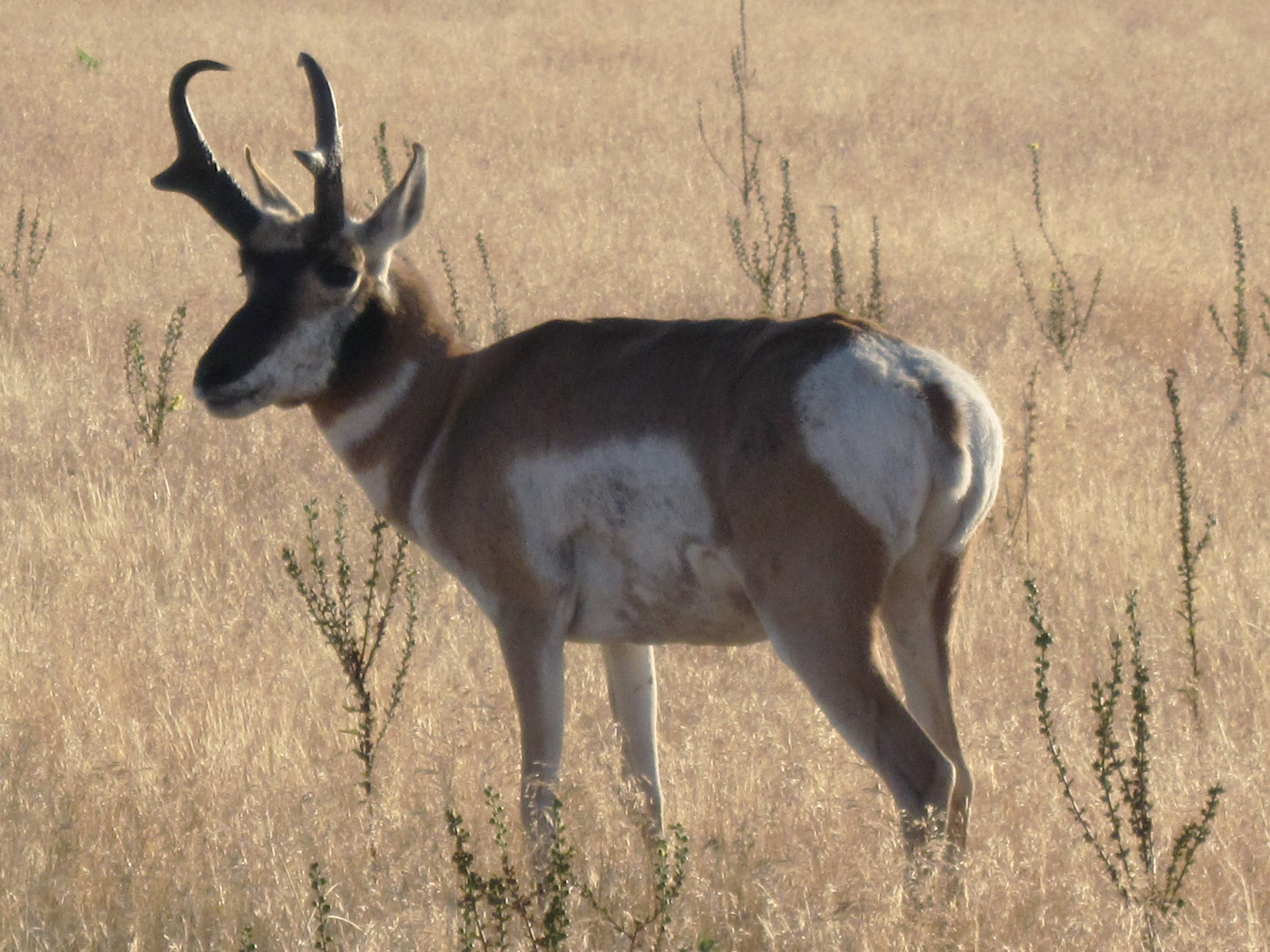
Pronghorn antelope

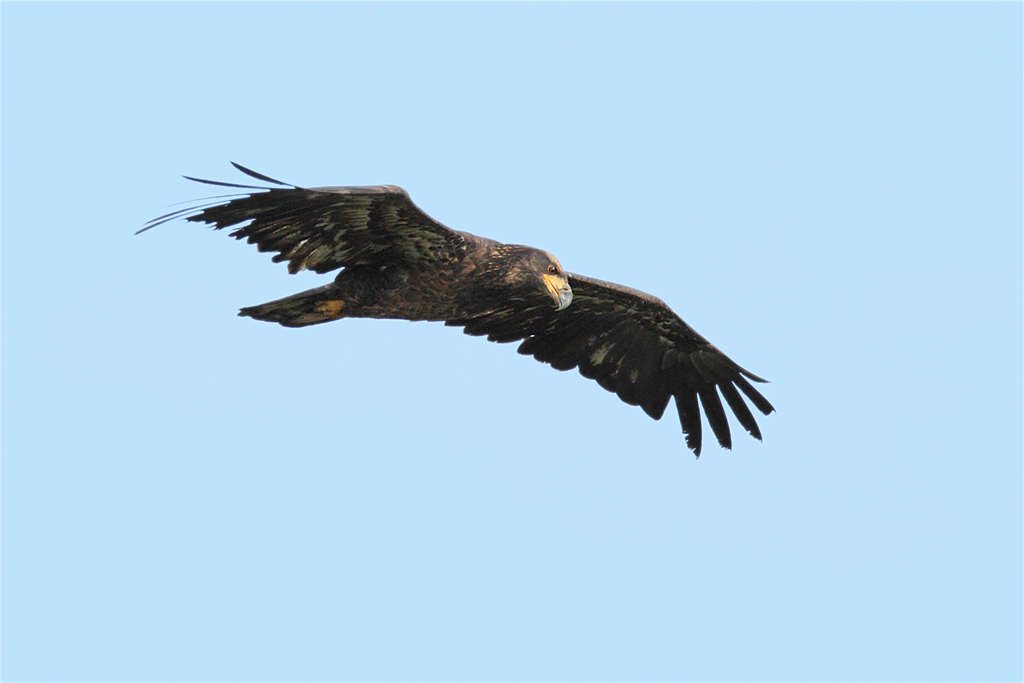
Juvenile bald eagle

=== Activities ===
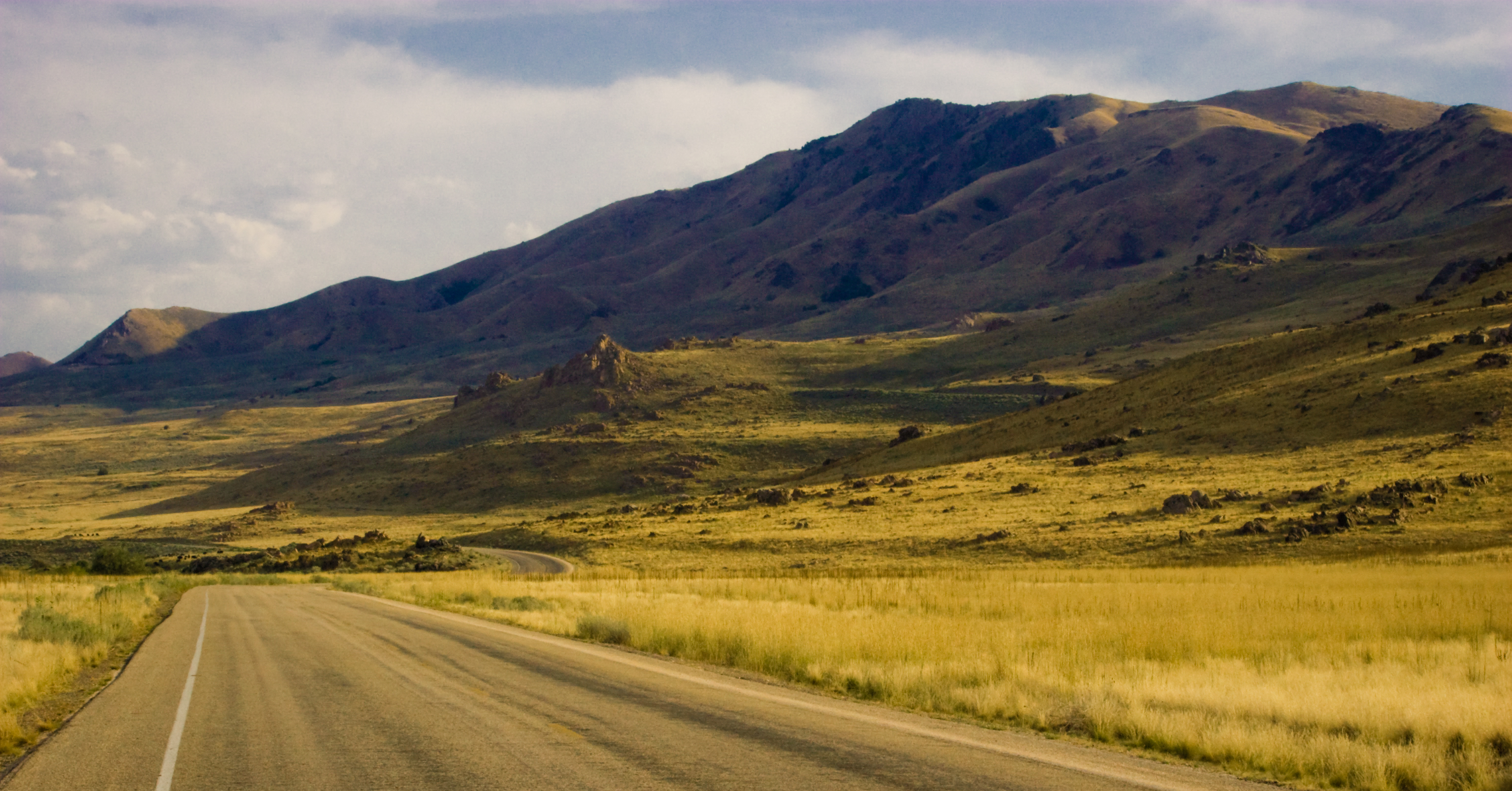
Road

Antelope Island State Park is open for year-round recreation. It features a marina, beach, campground and hiking trails. Tourists pay a fee to access the park via the island's causeways. The northern 2,000 acres (810 ha) are developed. There are several campsites, a day use area, swimming area, and picnic areas near Bridger Bay on the northwestern end of the island. There is a restaurant located near the Bridger Bay beach access. The rest of the park is largely undeveloped. A few old roads cross the island and so do some hiking trails. The remnants of old mining claims and the Fielding Garr Ranch are open to park visitors. There is a historic boat display in the marina. Antelope Island is known for its scenery, especially in the northwest quadrant of the island at Buffalo Point and White Rock Bay, where mountains and hills overlook beaches as well as the reflecting waters of the Great Salt Lake and other islands that are visible in the lake. Birdwatching on Antelope Island is popular. Hiking and cycling are common activities, but water is scarce and there are few trees on the island. Though not strictly a desert island there are no permanent human inhabitants and conditions are quite dry and can be very hot during the summer. Freely flowing freshwater is not readily available on the island, though there are a few natural springs, mostly in the mountainous spine of the island and towards the south end of the island. Water and restrooms are available in the visitor areas of the island. There is a gift shop and a small fast-food restaurant that is open during the main visitor season at Buffalo Point. Electric bikes are available for rentals or tours. Public beaches, a marina, and overnight camping areas are available on the northern part of the island.

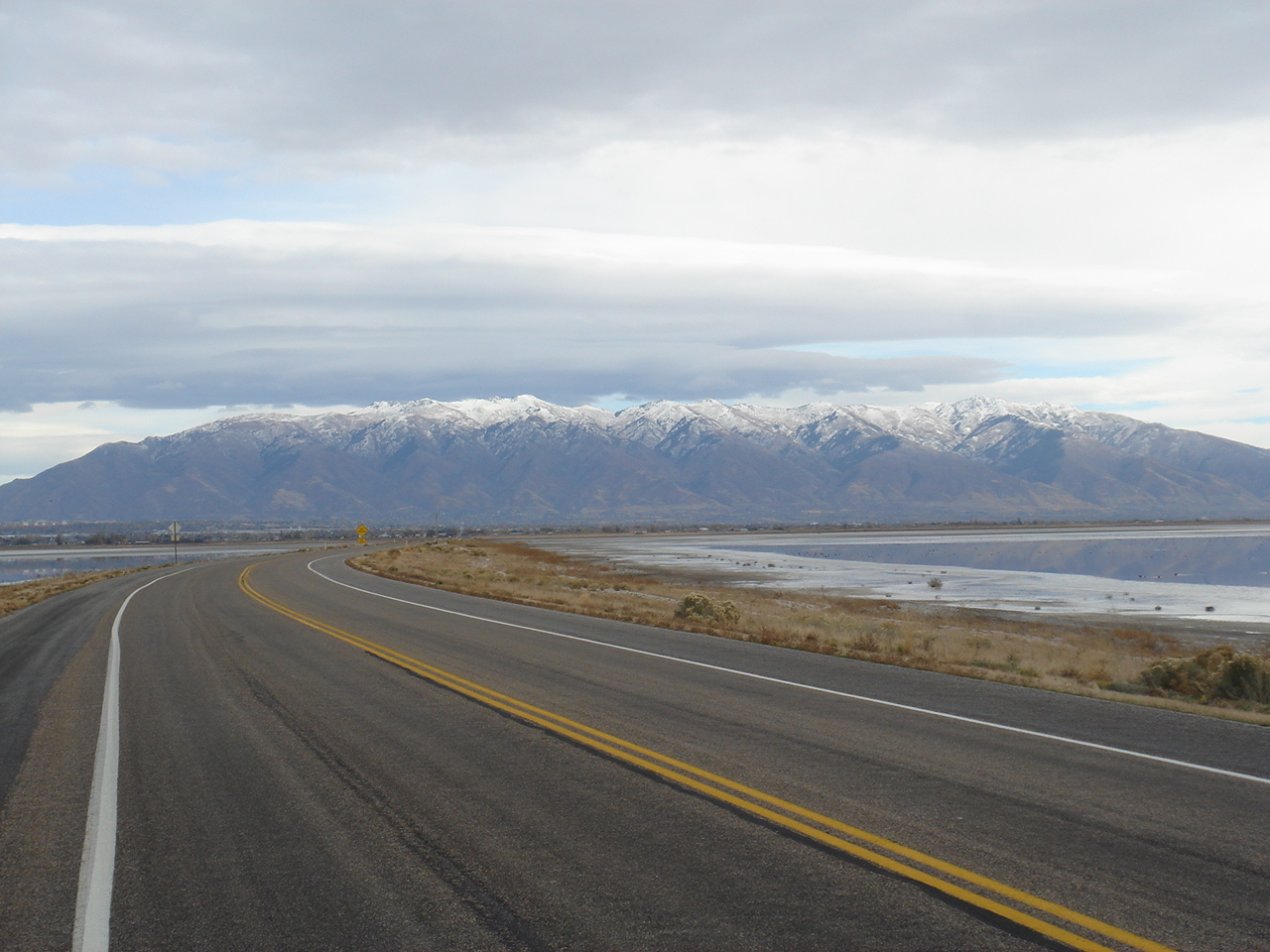
Causeway connecting Antelope Island to Syracuse, Utah

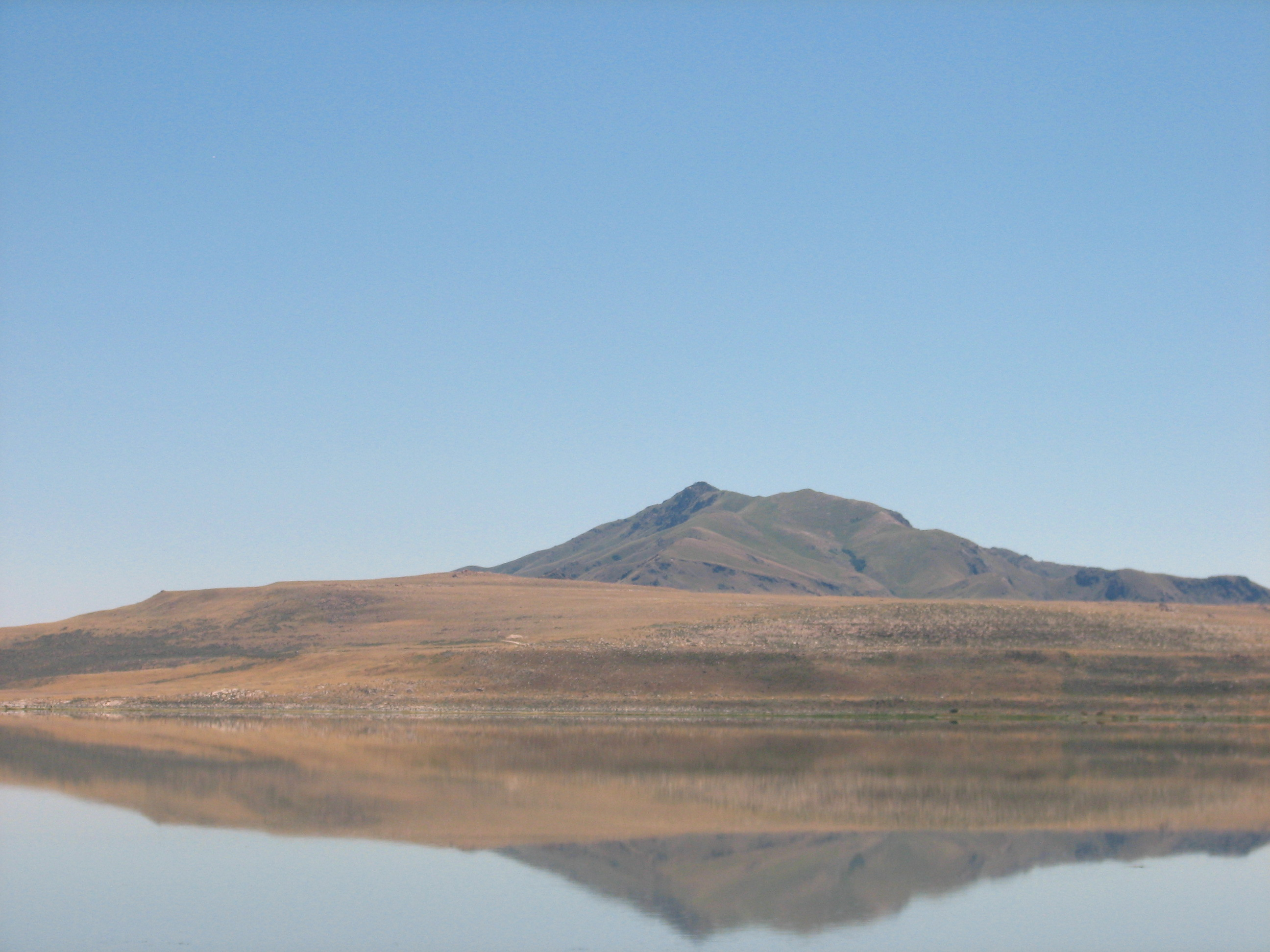
Coast of Antelope Island as seen from the causeway

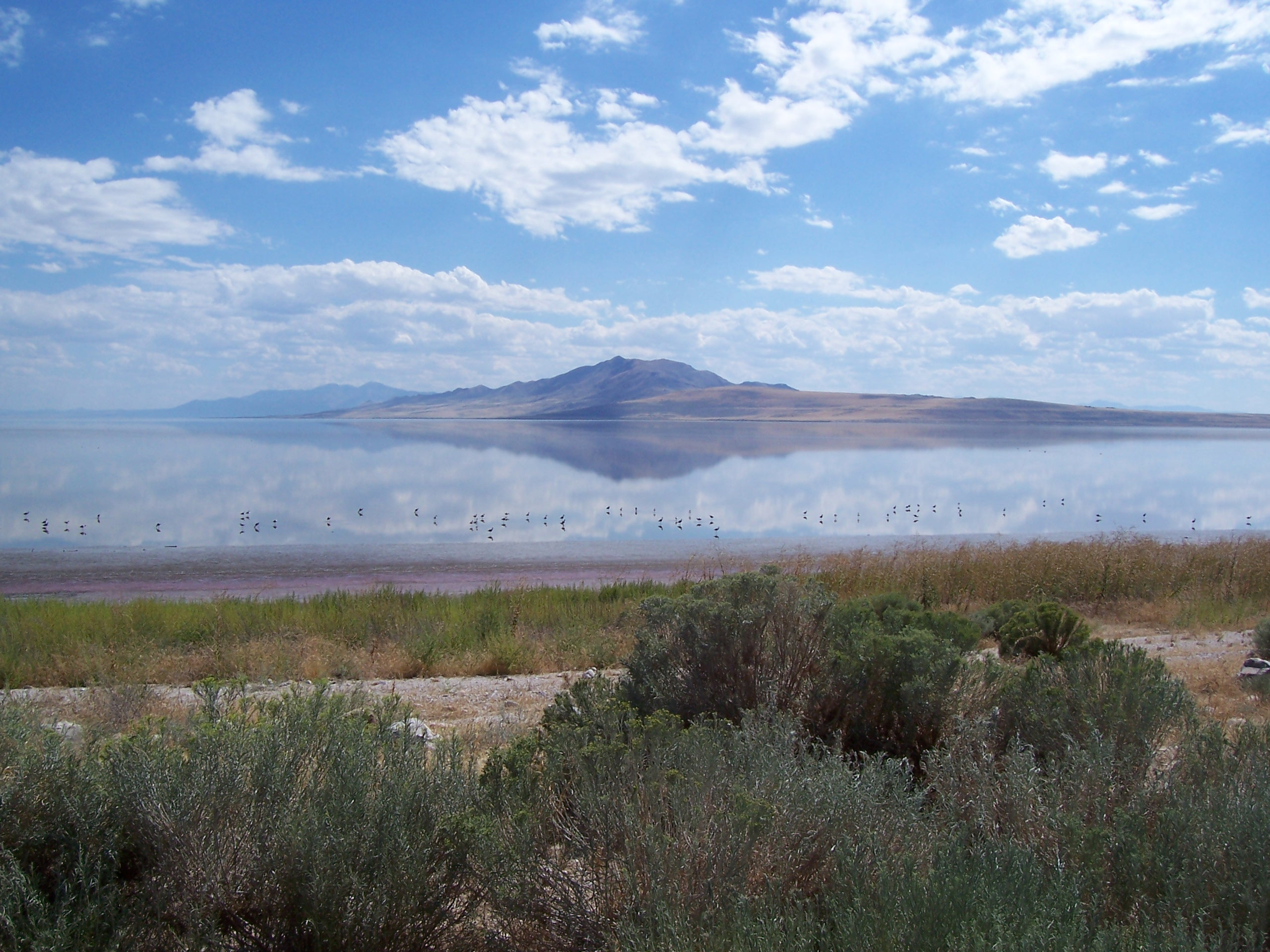
Antelope Island

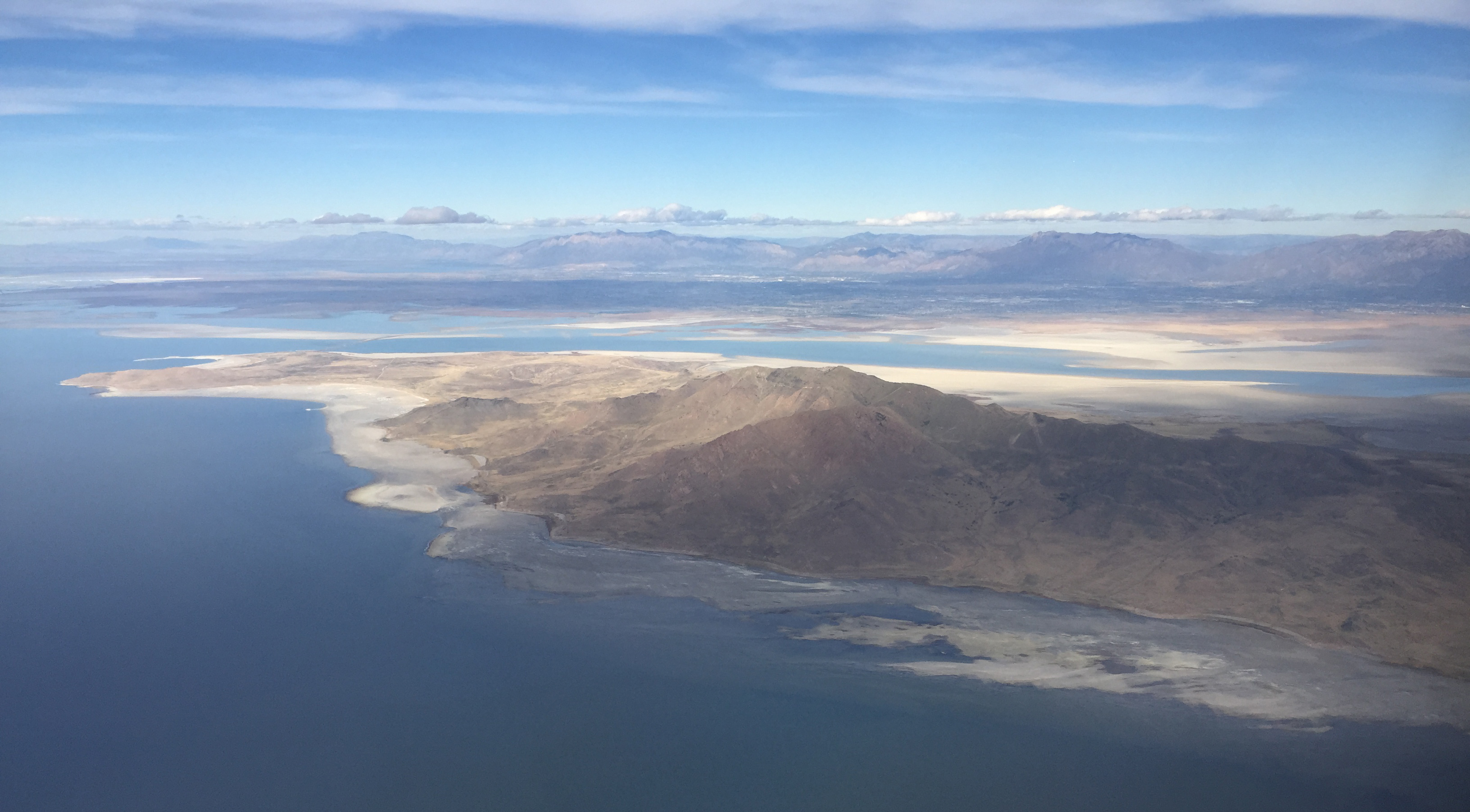
Aerial view of Antelope Island

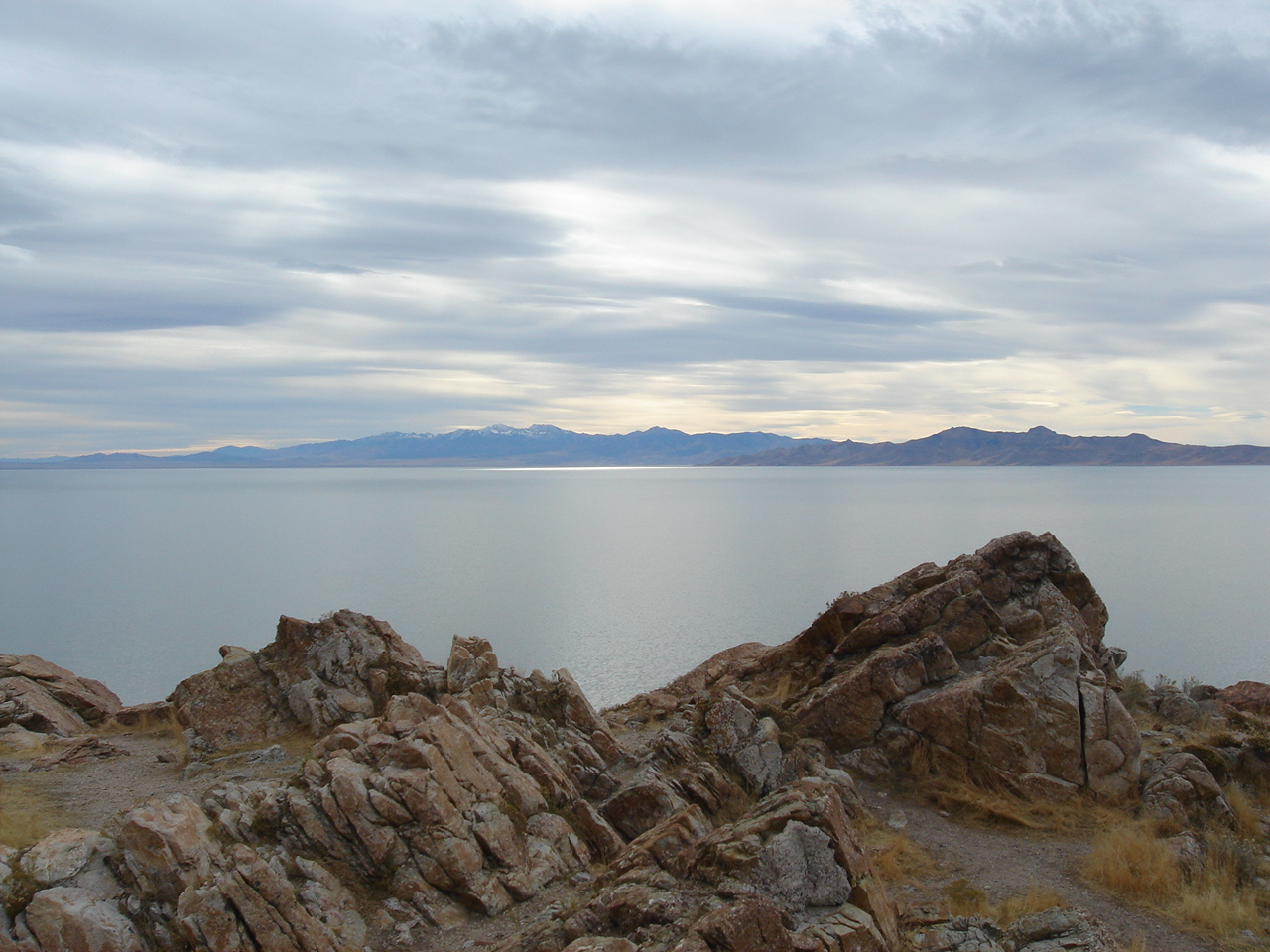
View of Great Salt Lake from Buffalo Point, Antelope Island

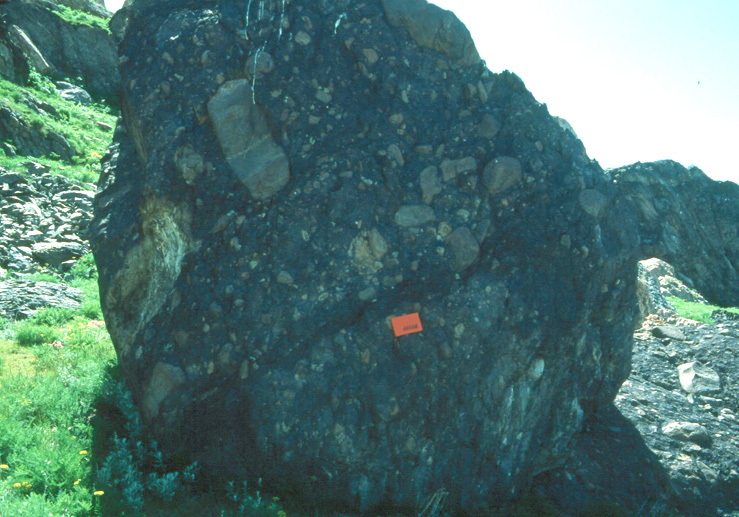
Boulder of diamictite of the Precambrian Mineral Fork Formation, along the Elephant Head Trail

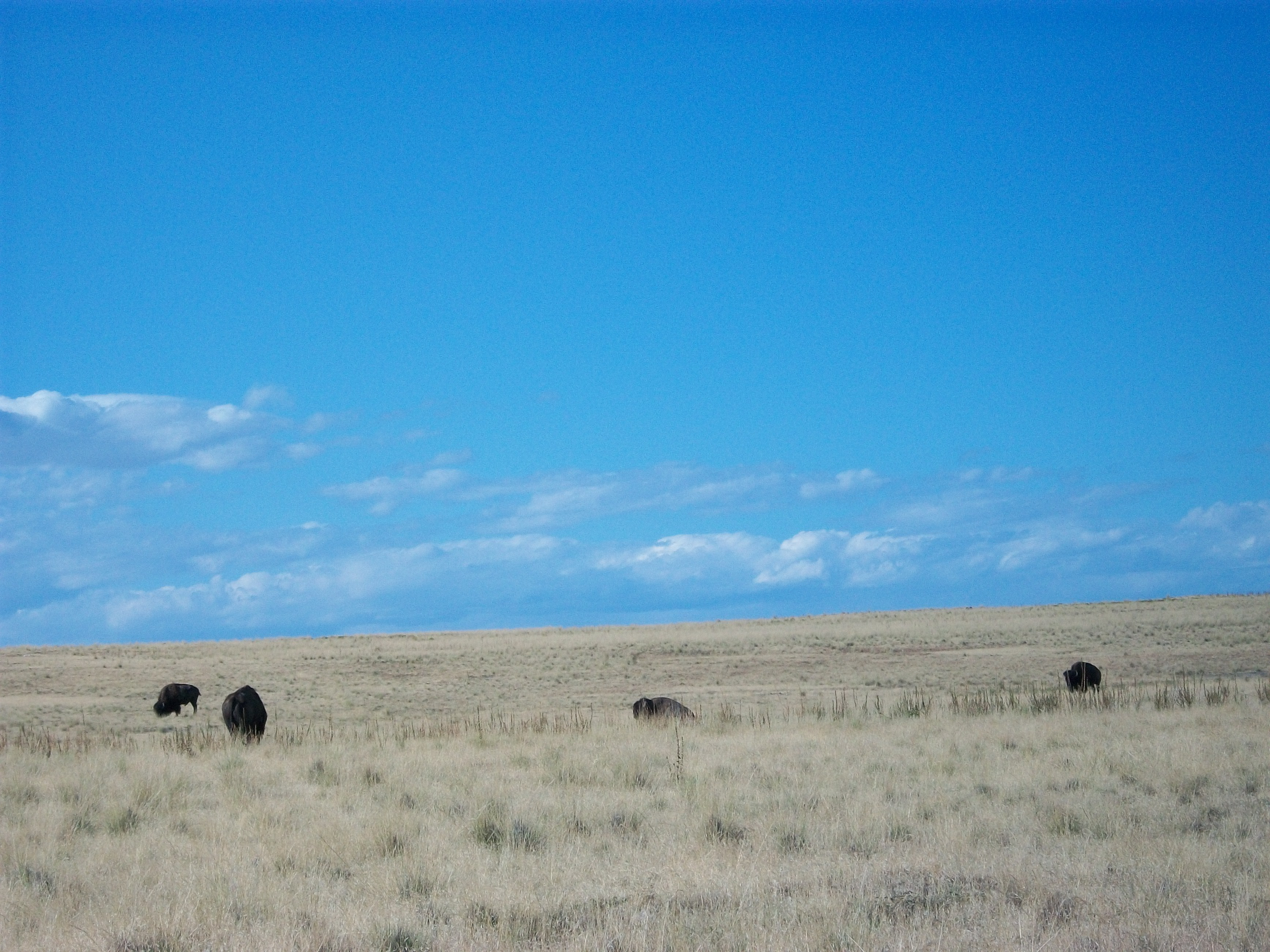
American bison grazing on Antelope Island

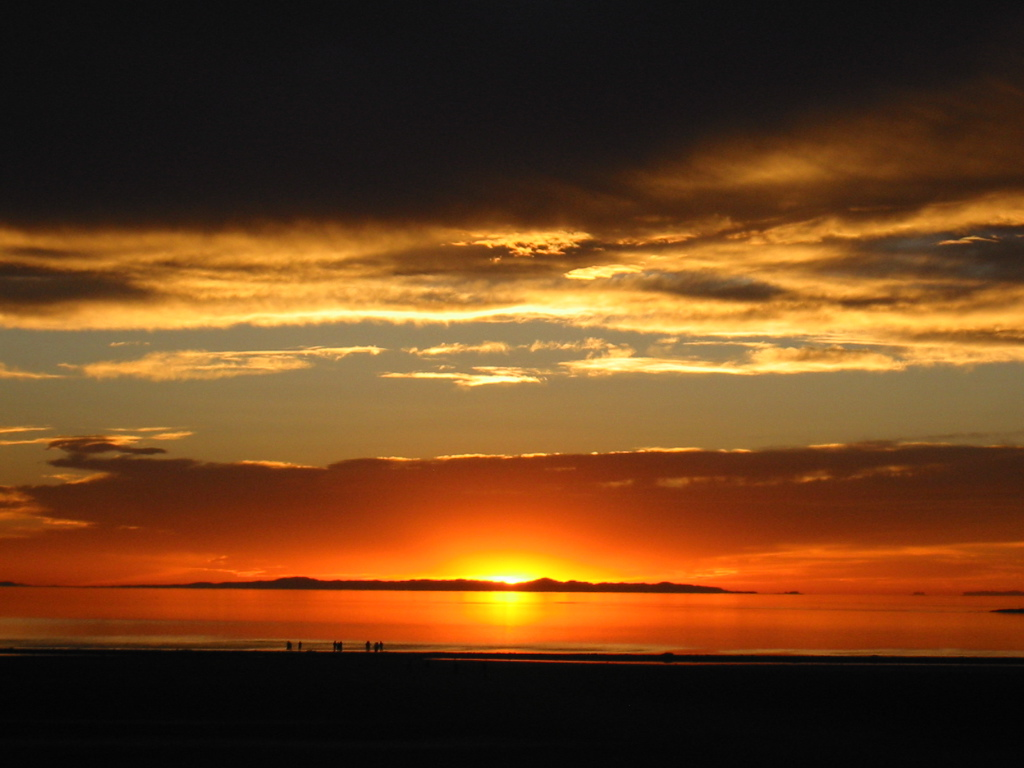
Antelope Island sunset

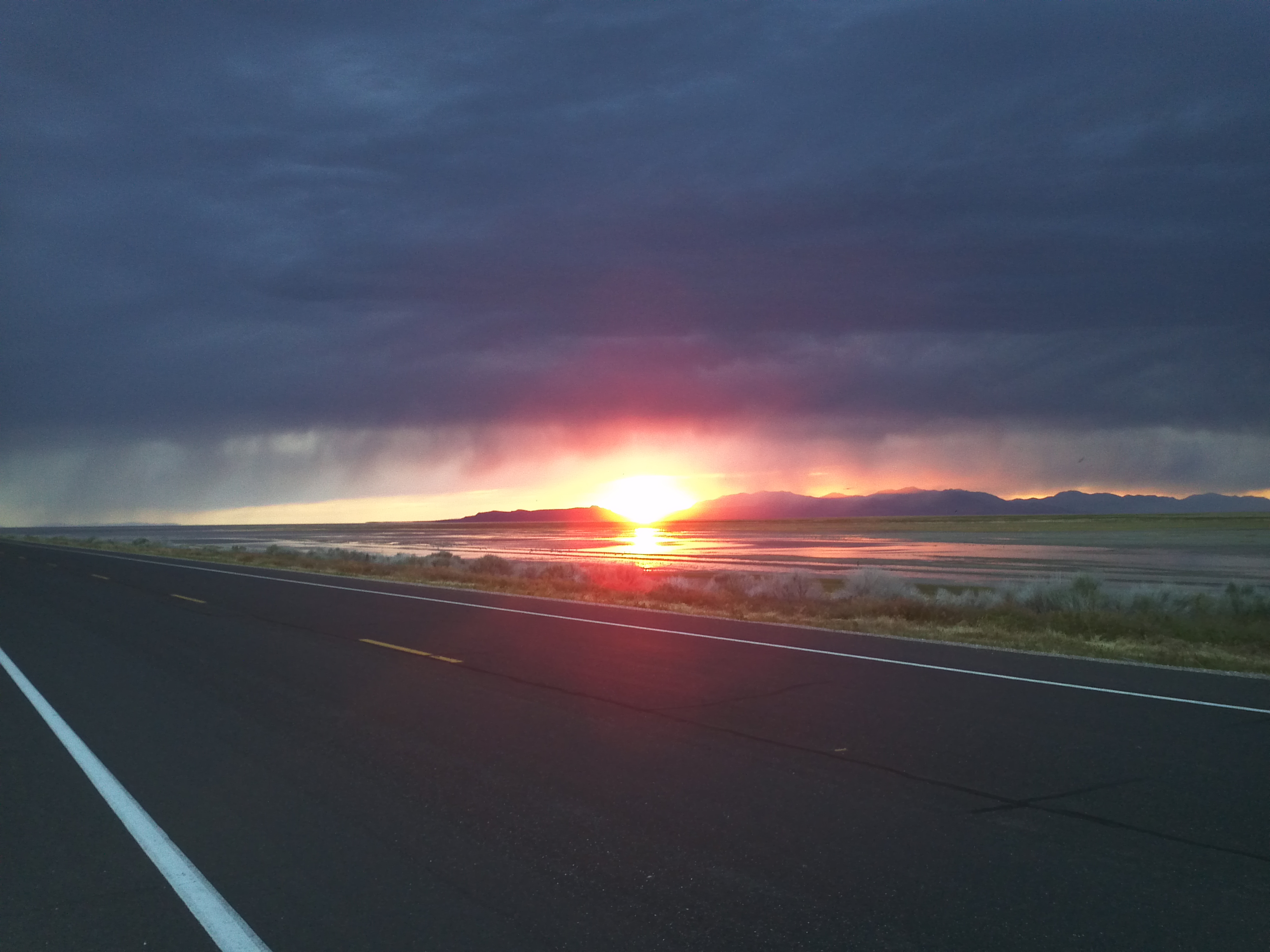
Sunset on the causeway

=== Visitor center ===
In February 2024, the Miller family foundation announced a $2.2 million donation to support water conservation efforts through the Antelope Island Learning Center. The related efforts including renovation of the learning center and the addition of a theater are being coordinated with the Utah Department of Natural Resources and Utah Water Ways.

=== Annual special events ===
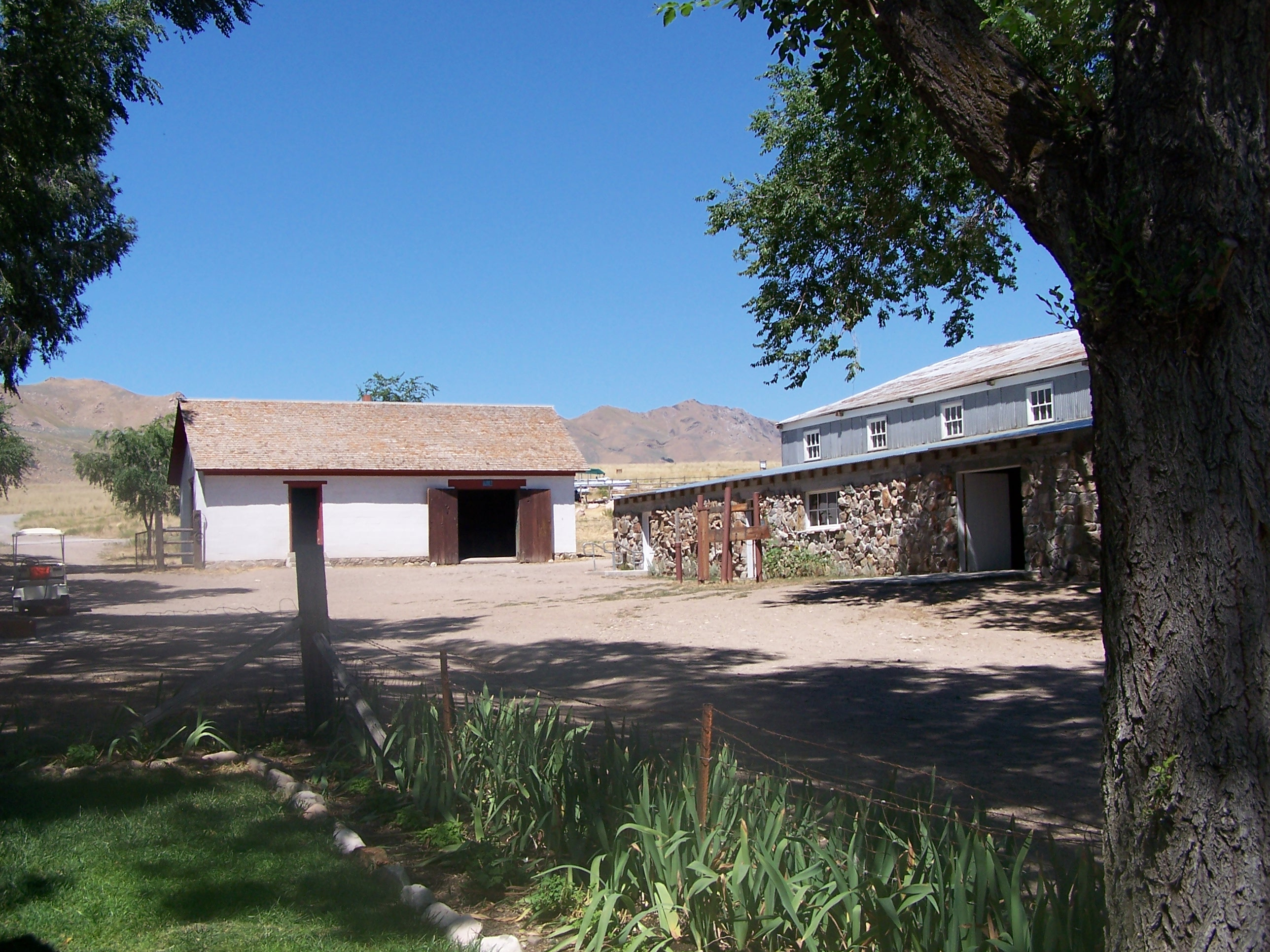
Fielding Garr Ranch

- Great Salt Lake Bird Festival - May
- Moonlight Bike Ride - June/July
- Balloon Stampede - September
- Buffalo Days - September
- The Bison Range Ride and Roundup - held every autumn attracts tourists from around the world. Bison are herded from the southern end of the island to holding pens on the northern end of the island. There the bison are vaccinated for parasites, infectious bovine rhino tracheitis, clostridium and bovine vibriosis. DNA and blood samples are taken. The bison are tagged with microchips and weighed and measured. The female bison are also vaccinated for brucellosis and checked for pregnancy. With the goal of keeping the herd at a manageable level the excess bison, about 150-200 head, are auctioned off in an annual sale that nets about $120,000 for the park.

== See also ==
- Fielding Garr Ranch
- Antelope Island bison herd
- Henry Mountains bison herd
- Fremont Island
- Stansbury Island
- Black Rock (Great Salt Lake)
- North Shore Monster, an entity from Utah folklore
