= Promontory Point =

Promontory Point may refer to:

== California ==
- Promontory Point (Newport Beach, California), a cape in Newport Beach, California
- Promontory Point (Tehama County, California), a summit in the Lassen National Forest in Tehama County, California

== Illinois ==
- Promontory Point (Chicago), a special use facility on Lake Michigan in the Chicago Park District in Chicago, Illinois

== Nevada ==
- Promontory Point (Nevada), a summit on a peninsula on Lake Mead in Clark County, Nevada, just north of the Hoover Dam

== Utah ==
- Promontory Point (Utah), a cape in Box Elder County, Utah
- Promontory Point, Utah, a ghost town on the cape
- Promontory, Utah, an unincorporated community at Promontory Summit, a.k.a. Promontory Point, a mountain gap in northern Utah where the U.S. Transcontinental Railroad connected

== See also ==
- Promontory (disambiguation)
- Point (disambiguation)
