= Promontory (disambiguation) =

A promontory is a prominent mass of land which overlooks lower lying land or a body of water.

Promontory may also refer to:

== Geology and geography ==
- Promontory Summit, where the United States first transcontinental railroad was completed in Box Elder County, Utah
  - Promontory, Utah, an unincorporated community on Promontory Summit
- Promontory Mountains, a mountain range in Box Elder County, Utah, United States

== Anatomy ==
- Sacral promontory, in anatomy, the anteriormost portion of the sacrum
- Promontory of tympanic cavity, a part of the ear

== Other ==
- Promontory (winery), a wine estate in California
- "Promontory", a 1992 song from The Last of the Mohicans soundtrack
- Promontory Financial Group, a wholly owned subsidiary of IBM
- The architecture codename for AMD chipsets for AM4 motherboards

== See also ==
- Promontory Point (disambiguation)
