= Donald Duk =

Novel by Frank Chin (1991)

- First edition cover
- Author: Frank Chin
- Cover artist: Susan Nees
- Language: English
- Genre: Young adult novel
- Publisher: Coffee House Press
- Publication date: February 1991
- Publication place: United States
- Media type: Print (Paperback)
- Pages: 172 pp (first edition, paperback)
- ISBN: 0-918273-83-8 (first edition, paperback)
- OCLC: 22887735
- LC Class: PZ7.C4423 Do 1991

Donald Duk is a coming-of-age novel written by Frank Chin, first published in February 1991. It is about an eleven-year-old boy turning twelve, completing a cycle of the Chinese zodiac, in San Francisco, and his struggles juggling cultures and growing into his name.

== Setting ==
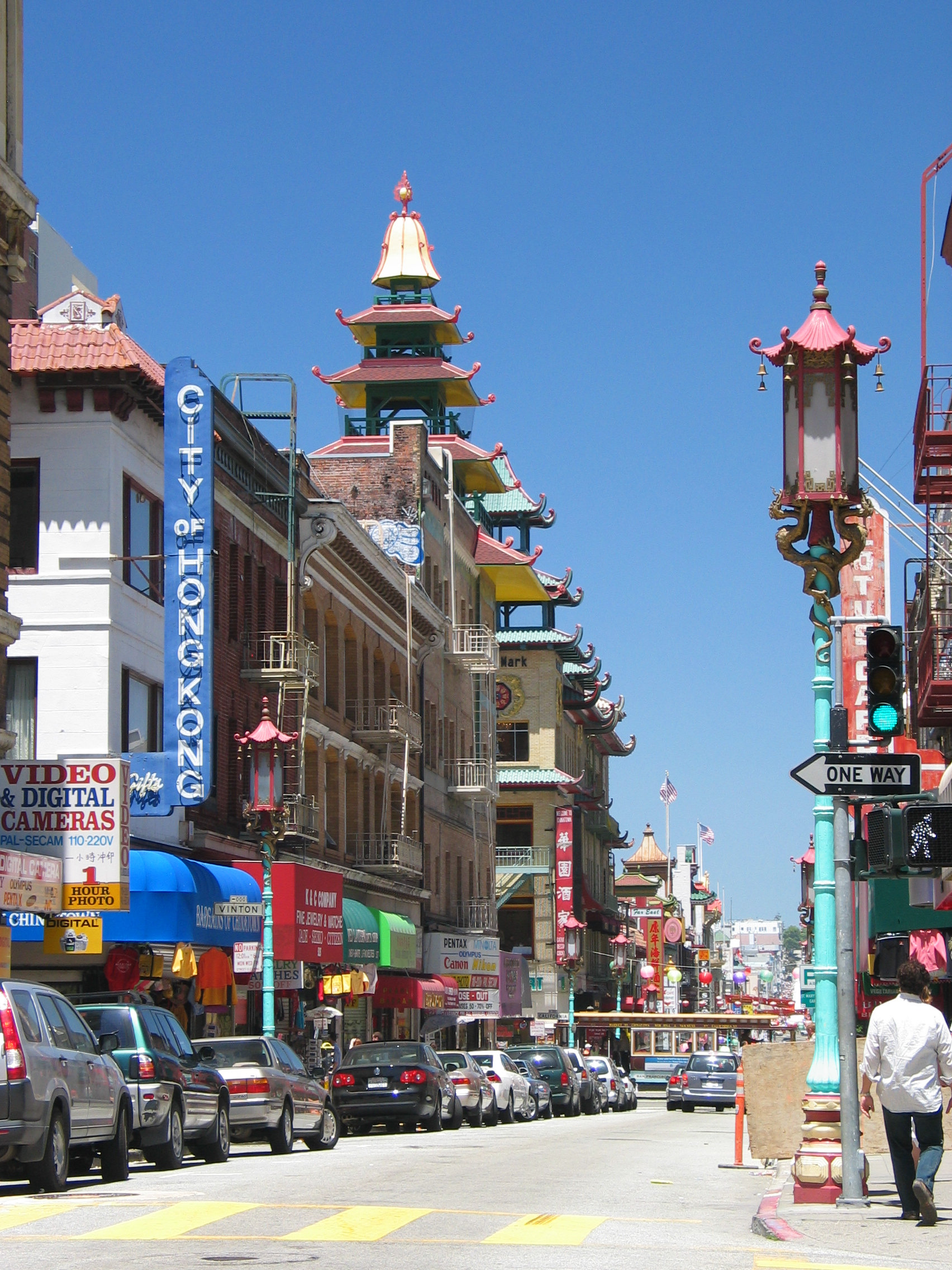
Grant Avenue in Chinatown, view north toward the intersection with California and the distinctive Sing Fat and Sing Chong buildings dating to 1906

The novel, written in 1991, is set in then present-day Chinatown, San Francisco, though it makes reference to many other historical periods.

== Plot elements ==
Donald Duk is an eleven-year-old Chinese-American, preparing to celebrate both his twelfth birthday and Chinese New Year. He is the son of a Chinese chef named King Duk, and a Chinese mother named Daisy Duk. Donald has two older twin sisters named Penelope and Venus Duk. From the start of the book we are told how embarrassed Donald is of his name and of being introduced with his family.

The story begins with Donald comparing himself to Fred Astaire. Donald believes he dances as well as Fred and throughout the novel considers himself the real "Chinese Fred Astaire" (91). Donald immerses himself in old black-and-white movies, and especially admires Fred Astaire and Ginger Rogers films. He envies the way "everyone" adores Fred when he dances. Donald wishes he could "live the late-night life in old black-and-white movies and talk with his feet like Fred Astaire, and smile Fred Astaire's sweet lemonade smile" (1).

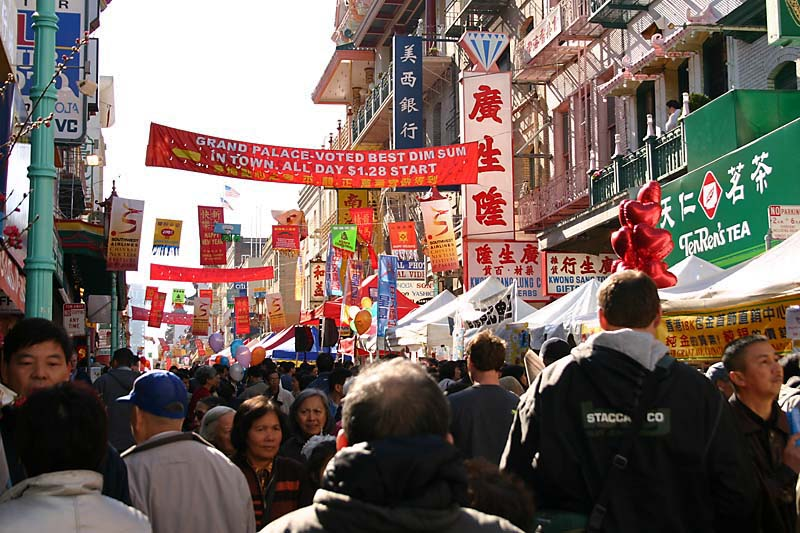
Grant Avenue during Chinese New Year (2006).

King Duk fears Donald sees the world too much in black-and-white, wanting to become as American as possible. Donald is ashamed of the way his family rejects American culture and that even when they watch television "they make everybody on the TV look Chinese!" (91). Donald does not want to be like them; he considers himself American because he was born in America. Donald's father tells him, "I think Donald Duk may be the very last American-born Chinese-American boy to believe you have to give up being Chinese to be an American" (42).

Having to put up with harassment due to his uncomfortable name, Donald also listens to his father's advice on standing up to bullies.

As Donald and his family welcome the Chinese New Year, Donald's best friend, Arnold Azalea, stays over at Donald's home in Chinatown in order to observe Chinese culture and celebrate the new year. On the first day of the New Year, Donald's family begins to talk about Chinese immigrants working on the Central Pacific Railroad end of the Transcontinental Railroad. Donald begins to have dreams of being a lion dancer, urging the Chinese gandy dancing railroad men on in a race to Promontory Summit. As these dreams progress, he is inspired to read up on the work the Chinese immigrants put into this track-laying and finds that the photos in the history books of Promontory Summit only show white workers: the role of Chinese labor had disappeared from history. Suddenly Donald finds himself claiming that white people are racists. King reminds his son that not all white people are racist and that up to that point, Donald had been the one acting ashamed of his cultural identity.

Hallucinatory dreams are interwoven with trips to the Chinese apothecary with his father and with tales of illicit firecracker dealers from the neighborhood gang. Subplots include Donald stealing and destroying one of the model airplanes his family has been making for the festival; Donald and Arnold getting in trouble with the police for blowing up fireworks in traffic; Donald's annoyance at the UC Berkeley idealism of his schoolteacher concerning Chinese Americans; and Donald's discomfort at learning that a Vietnam veteran in his neighborhood has been incorrectly arrested for a murder that happened while he had been with Donald.

== Characters ==
Donald Duk is a Chinese American boy turning twelve who lives with his family in Chinatown, San Francisco. "Donald Duk hates his name. He is not a duck. He is not a cartoon character" (1). Donald wishes he was Fred Astaire and aspires to be like him. He loves tap dancing and sometimes daydreams he is talking with Astaire. Donald is ashamed of being Chinese and wishes he was only American. He finds his culture stupid, boring and embarrassing. The story covers his search for identity and his path to accepting his culture.

Arnold Azalea is Donald's best friend and attends the same school as Donald. He is white and is very fascinated by Donald's culture. He stays with Donald for a couple weeks so he can spend Chinese New Year with Donald and his family. He can't understand why Donald hates his culture and Chinese people so much. At one point, he and Donald get into a fight over Arnold's interest in the Chinese. It is also implied that he sometimes shares Donald's dreams about the railroad workers.

King Duk is Donald's father. King owns a Chinese restaurant in Chinatown, of which he is the chef. He is recognized by his community as having the most authentic Chinese food. King is also the one who provides Donald with tough love rather than pity when Donald complains of the bullies in the neighborhood. King's response is, "You walk like a sad softie...you look like you want everyone to beat you up" (3). He is direct with Donald and refuses to allow him to linger in self-pity but rather provides him with insight to allow him to accept his heritage. King had assimilationist parents and learned about his Chinese heritage only after he ran away from home and studied Chinese opera overseas.

Daisy Duk is Donald's mother. She is the reasonable one in the family. Daisy keeps the balance within the family when Donald upsets his father with anti-Chinese remarks.

Penelope Duk is Donald's older sister. Penny has a twin sister named Venus. She is eccentric and likes to make pop culture references often when the mood is sour and in order to lighten it.

Venus Duk is Donald's other older sister. She is Penny's twin and with Penny, she discusses pop culture and both provide the book with a sense of humorous relief.

Uncle Donald Duk is Donald's uncle, a Chinese opera performer touring with his troupe. He provides a lighter tone when issues arise between Donald and his father. He provides Donald with insight into his heritage and helps him understand the accomplishments of his race in America. He is also especially the one to tell Donald of the work Chinese immigrants put into building the Central Pacific Railroad.

Larry Louie is Donald's dance instructor. He is also known as "The Chinese Fred Astaire." He keeps himself looking very thin in order to physically resemble Astaire. Larry Louie enjoys tap dance but he also enjoys flamenco and because of this, Donald feels he is the true "Chinese Fred Astaire." Donald doesn't think that Astaire enjoyed flamenco and therefore Larry Louie shouldn't either.

The Frog Twins are local residents who used to be Hollywood actresses. Late in the novel, they have a conversation that illustrates some of the difficulties of being an Asian or Asian-American actress at the time.

American Cong is a Vietnam veteran that Donald meets early in the novel. He is Chinese American, but talks about himself as white, since he grew up in Iowa. He is arrested for murder, but Donald's testimony that they were together at the time of the murder (coupled with corroboration from the Frog Twins) gets him released.

== Literary significance and reception ==
Donald Duk is recognized by many critics as "a small masterpiece" (novelist Tom Robbins, back cover of book). Kirkus Reviews described the novel as a "wonderfully zany coming-of-age journey that deals with the interpenetration of Chinese myth and American popular culture". Donald Duk has also become required reading at many schools, "having sold 45,000 copies, many through college course adoptions". Donald Duk has been the subject of several scholarly works by academics, and remains one of Chin's more popular and studied works.

== Allusions and references ==
=== Allusions to history ===
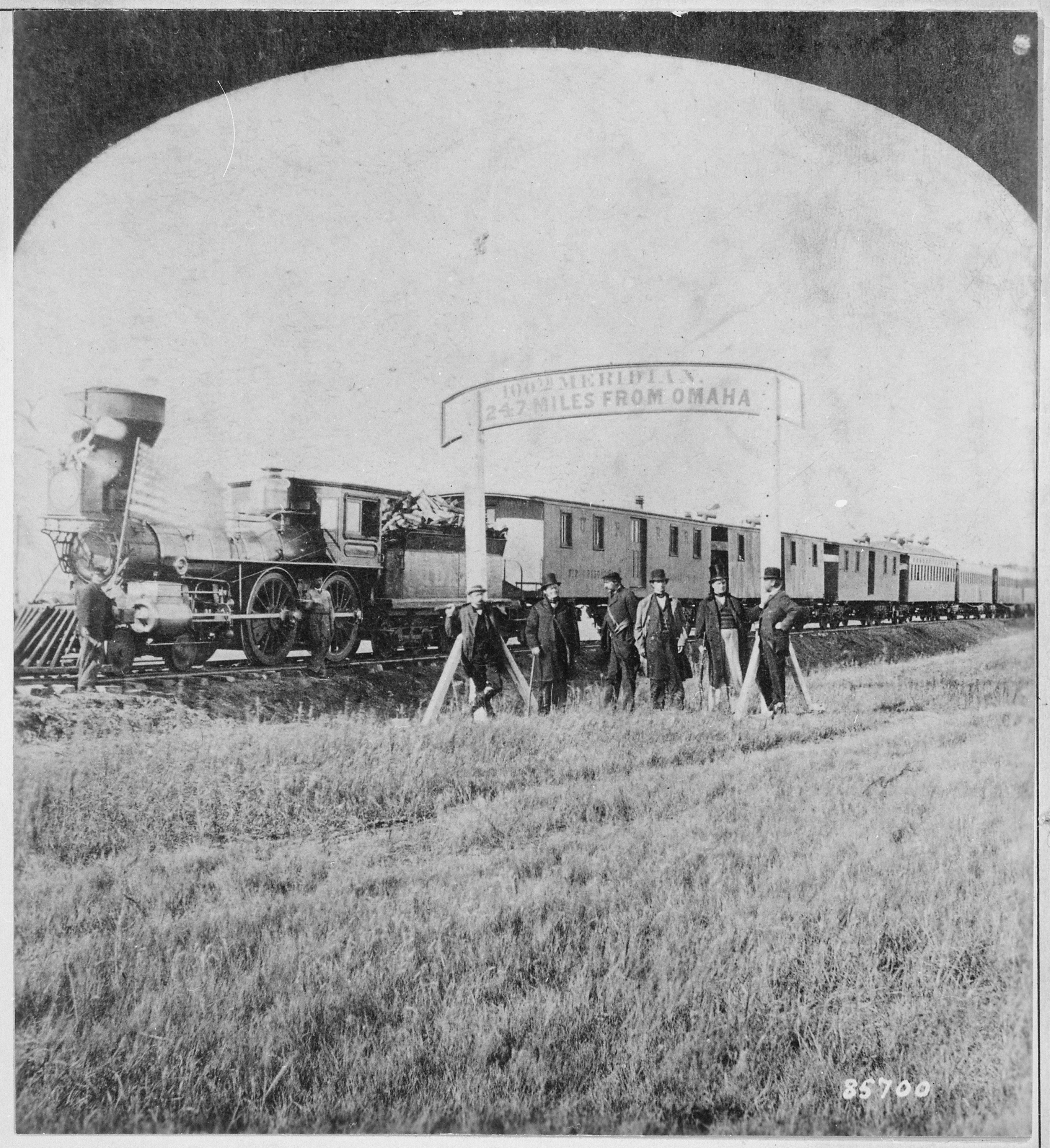
Transcontinental railroad under construction

The novel mentions the Union Pacific Railroad and sets the "legendary Kwan Kung as foreman of the Chinese laborers building the Central Pacific Railroad" in the 1860s. The book deals with the issue that these Chinese laborers didn't get the credit they deserved for building the railroad. Although Kwan Kung, a famous general of the late Eastern Han Dynasty and Three Kingdoms era of China, died centuries before the railroad was built, the building of the railroad by Chinese workers did take place. It also references the lives and treatment of Chinese Americans who lived in Chinatown during the mid/late 20th century. This book altogether deals with "racist U.S. exclusion laws, the nineteenth century exploitation of Chinese laborers, the distortion of classic Chinese philosophy and literature, the erasure of Chinese-American history, [and] the emasculating stereotypes of Chinese in the American media".

=== Allusions to other works ===
==== Artists and performers ====
- Don Ameche
- Fred Astaire (1)
- Gene Autry
- Connie Chung
- Joan Crawford (170)
- Greta Garbo
- Alec Guinness (33)
- Rita Hayworth (2)
- Katharine Hepburn (162)
- Julio Iglesias (59)
- Bette Midler (165)
- Marilyn Monroe
- Ricky Nelson
- Ginger Rogers (1)
- Frank Sinatra (51)
- Barbara Stanwyck (2)
- Shirley Temple (165)
- Lily Tomlin (165)

==== Authors, poets, artists and illustrators ====
- Richard Avedon
- Samuel Beckett
- Pearl Buck (135)
- R. Crumb
- Eugène Ionesco
- Robert Lowell (156)
- Norman Rockwell (156)
- Jean-Paul Sartre

==== Historical figures ====
- Chang Apana
- Attila the Hun
- Jack and Dan Casement
- Charles Crocker
- Thomas C. Durant
- Mark Hopkins
- Collis Huntington
- Leland Stanford

==== Literature and publications ====
- Water Margin
- Romance of the Three Kingdoms
- Adventures of Huckleberry Finn (32)
- Harper's Weekly (127)
- Frank Leslie's Illustrated Newspaper (127)
- The Good Earth (135)

==== Film and TV shows ====
- Sesame Street (126)
- Planet of the Apes (69)
- Conquest of the Planet of the Apes (69)
- Ironside (51)
- Flying Down to Rio (44)
- Suzie Wong

==== Literary characters ====
- Kwan Kung
- Lee Kuey
- Ten Feet of Steel
- Song Goong
- Doong the tattooed wrestler
- Ngawk Fay
- Charlie Chan
- Robin Hood (113)
- Spider-Man (113)
- Batman and Robin (113)
- Donald Duck (171)
- Betty Boop
- The Candlewick Fairy—Chinese legend

==== Music ====
- "To All the Girls I Loved" performed by Julio Iglesias (59)

== Awards and nominations ==
Donald Duk earned Chin a 1992 Lannan Literary Award for fiction, as well as a selection as one of the Best Books for Young Adults by the New York Public Library. Chin was the first Asian American to receive recognition from the Lannan Foundation.

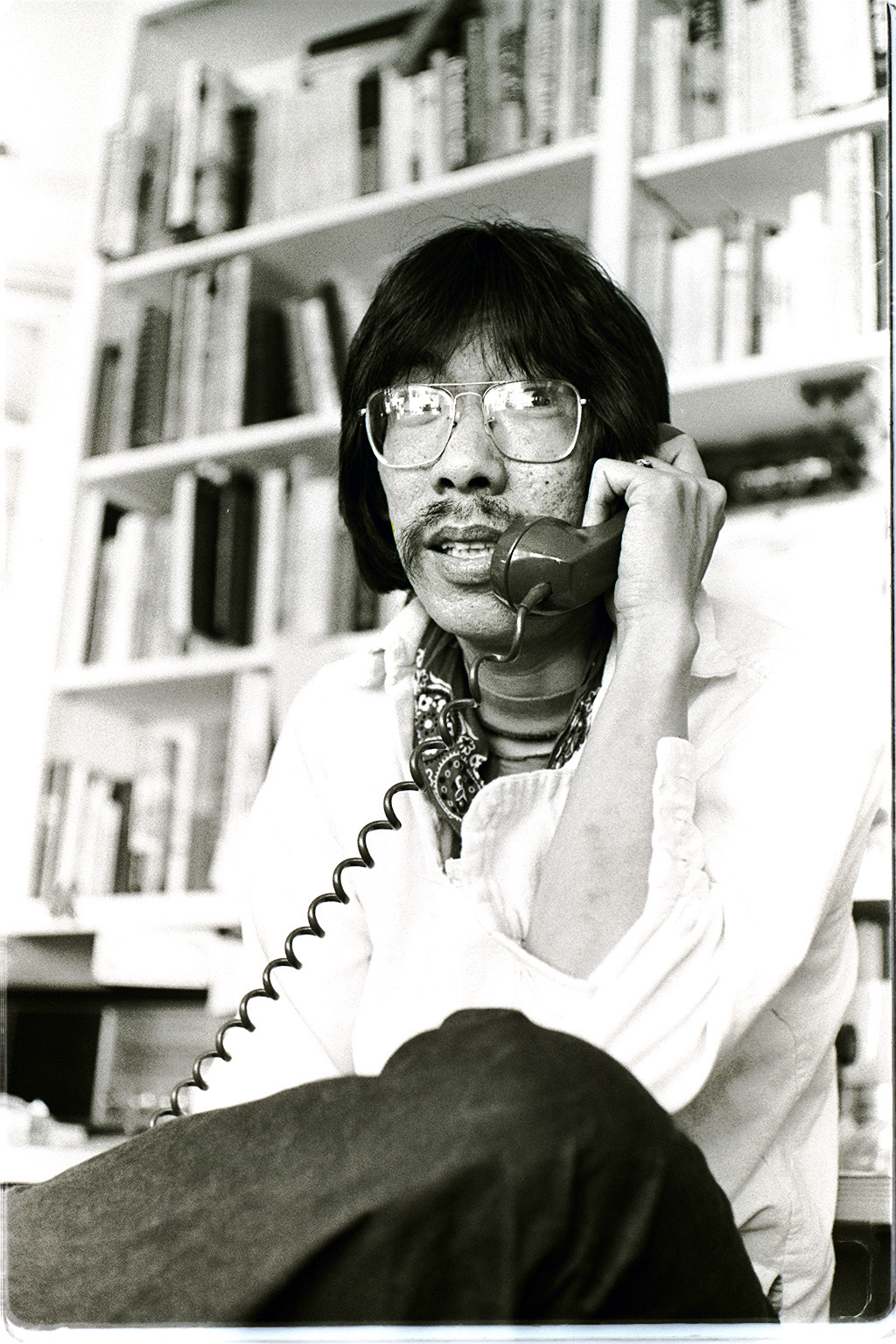
Author Frank Chin in San Francisco, 1975

== Publication history ==
1991, United States; Coffee House Press ISBN 0-918273-83-8; Pub date Feb 1991; Paperback/Second Edition

== Footnotes ==
=== References ===
As of March 2008, there were 14 published articles on the novel listed at the MLA database:

1. The Deployment of Chinese Classics by Frank Chin and Maxine Hong Kingston By: King-Kok Cheung. IN: Wang, Querying the Genealogy: Comparative and Transnational Studies in Chinese American Literature. Shanghai, China: Shanghai yi wen chu ban she; 2006. pp. 217–30
2. Hua Mei wen hua de chuan cheng yu bian yi-Tou shi Hua yi Meiguo nan zuo jia bi xia de "fu yu zi" mu ti By: Ruoqian Pu. IN: Wang, Querying the Genealogy: Comparative and Transnational Studies in Chinese American Literature. Shanghai, China: Shanghai yi wen chu ban she; 2006. pp. 450–64
3. Dreaming as Cultural Work in Donald Duk and Dreaming in Cuban By: Suzanne Leonard; MELUS: The Journal of the Society for the Study of the Multi-Ethnic Literature of the United States, 2004 Summer; 29 (2): 181–203.
4. English as a Postcolonial Tool By: Eugene Chen Eoyang; English Today: The International Review of the English Language, 2003 Oct; 19 (4 [76]): 23–29.
5. "Adding On", Not "Giving Up": Ceremonies of Self in Frank Chin's Donald Duk By: Gordon O. Taylor. IN: Davis and Ludwig, Asian American Literature in the International Context: Readings on Fiction, Poetry, and Performance. Hamburg, Germany: Lit; 2002. pp. 57–66
6. Authentic Reproductions: The Making and Re-Making of More Asian Americans in Donald Duk, Bone, and Native Speaker By: Vivian Fumiko Chin; Dissertation, U of California, Berkeley, 2001.
7. "To Eat the Flesh of His Dead Mother": Hunger, Masculinity, and Nationalism in Frank Chin's Donald Duk By: Eileen Chia-Ching Fung. IN: Counihan, Food in the USA: A Reader. New York, NY: Routledge; 2002. pp. 263–76 ALSO IN: Lit: Literature Interpretation Theory, 1999 Dec; 10 (3): 255–74.
8. "The Dragon Is a Lantern": Frank Chin's Counter-Hegemonic Donald Duk By: David Goldstein-Shirley; 49th Parallel: An Interdisciplinary Journal of North American Studies, 2000 Autumn; 6: (no pagination).
9. The Remasculinization of Chinese America: Race, Violence, and the Novel By: Viet Thanh Nguyen; American Literary History, 2000 Spring-Summer; 12 (1–2): 130–57.
10. The Lessons of Donald Duk By: Susan B. Richardson; MELUS, 1999 Winter; 24 (4): 57–76.
11. Some Other Country's History By: Carole Scott; Papers: Explorations into Children's Literature, 1999 Aug; 9 (2): 21–30.
12. How to Do Things with Things (A Toy Story) By: Bill Brown; Critical Inquiry, 1998 Summer; 24 (4): 935–64.
13. Past and Repast: Food as Historiography in Fae Myenne Ng's Bone and Frank Chin's Donald Duk By: Nicole Waller; Amerikastudien/American Studies, 1996; 40 (3): 485–502.
14. Affirmations: Speaking the Self into Being By: Manini Samarth; Parnassus: Poetry in Review, 1992; 17 (1): 88–101.
15. Seiwoong Oh: Encyclopedia of Asian-American Literature. Series: Encyclopedia of American Ethnic Literature. Facts on File, 2007
