= Promontory Point (Utah) =

Headland in Box Elder County, Utah, United States

- Promontory
- Location within Utah Location within the United States
- Coordinates: 41°13′20″N 112°24′41″W
- Location: Box Elder County, Utah; United States
- Range: Promontory Mountains
- Water bodies: Great Salt Lake
- Elevation: 1,497 m (4,912 ft)

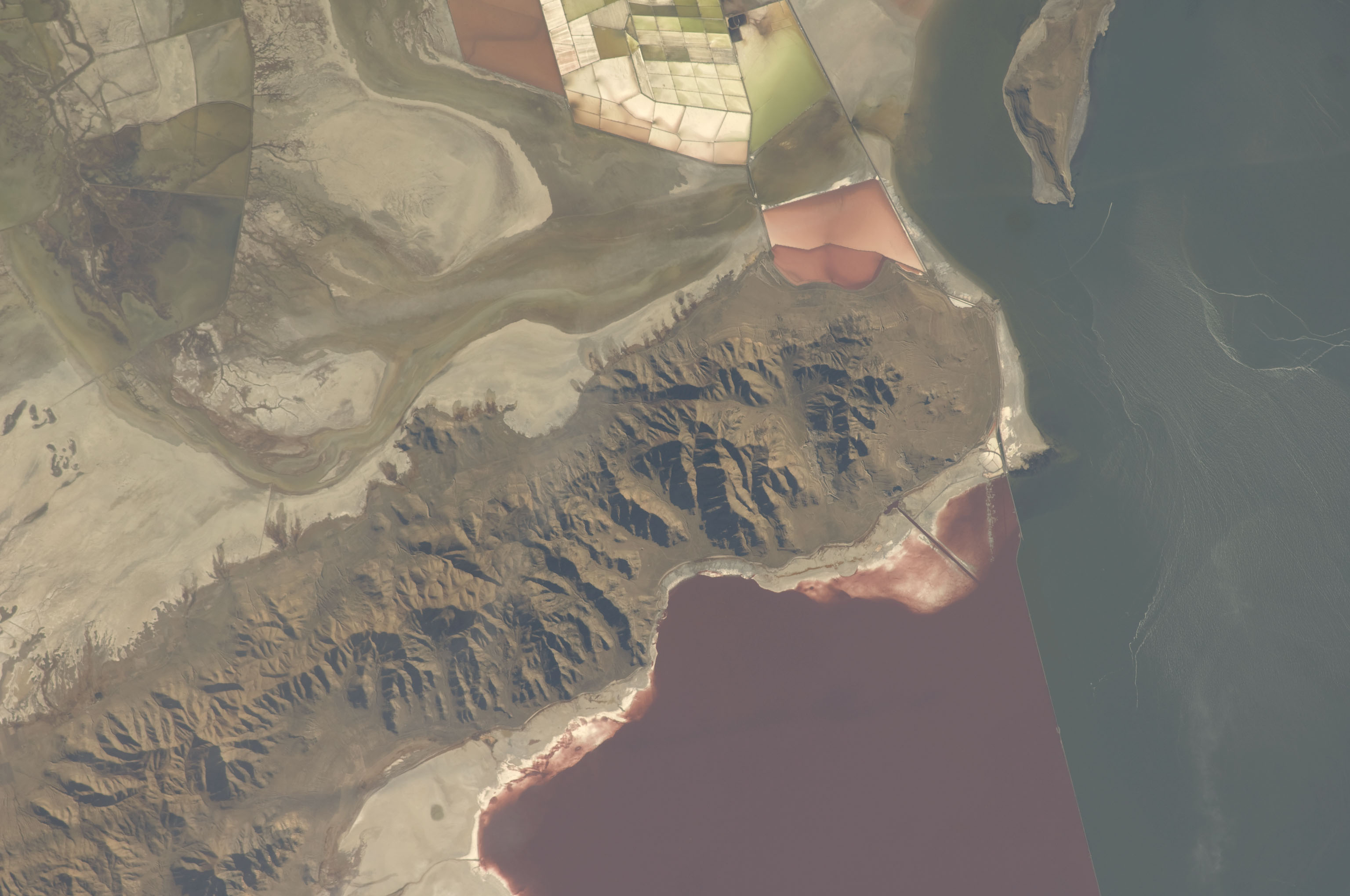
Promontory Peninsula in 2008

Promontory Point is the promontory or southernmost point of the peninsula formed where the Promontory Mountains project into the northern Great Salt Lake in southeastern Box Elder County, Utah, United States.

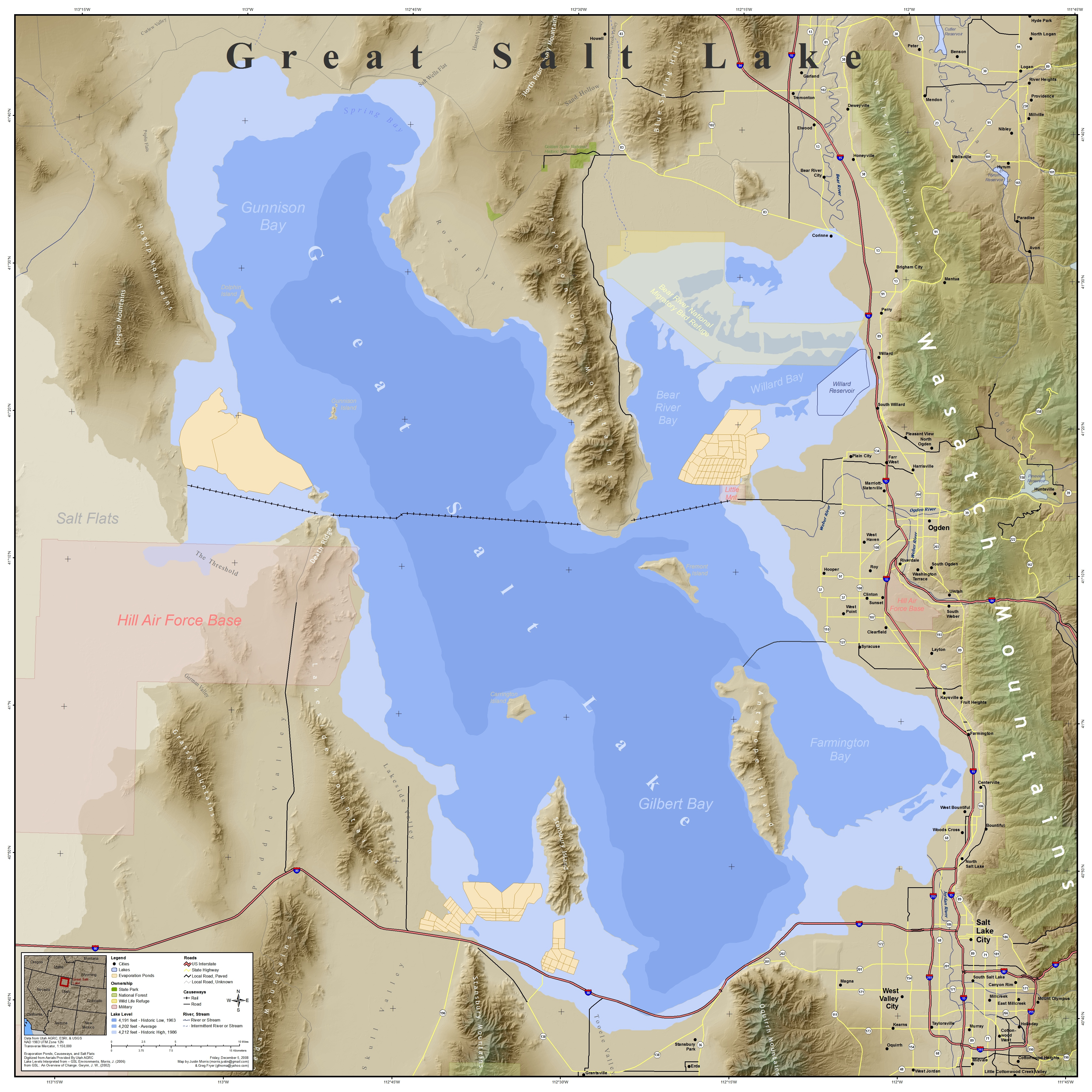
Promontory Peninsula with the Lucin Cutoff crossing the end of the peninsula

== Description ==
The promontory is 3 miles (4.8 km) northwest of the west end of Fremont Island in Weber County. The Lucin Cutoff passes 1,250 feet (380 m) north of the point of the promontory.

The unincorporated community of Promontory and its location, Promontory Summit, are also frequently referred to as "Promontory Point". Promontory Summit is the site where the First transcontinental railroad was completed and is located about 30 miles (48 km) north–northwest of the promontory, near the north end of the Promontory Mountains.
