= Tracklaying race of 1869 =

Building the transcontinental railroad

Coordinates: 41°57.76′N 112°59.31′W

Ten Mile Day
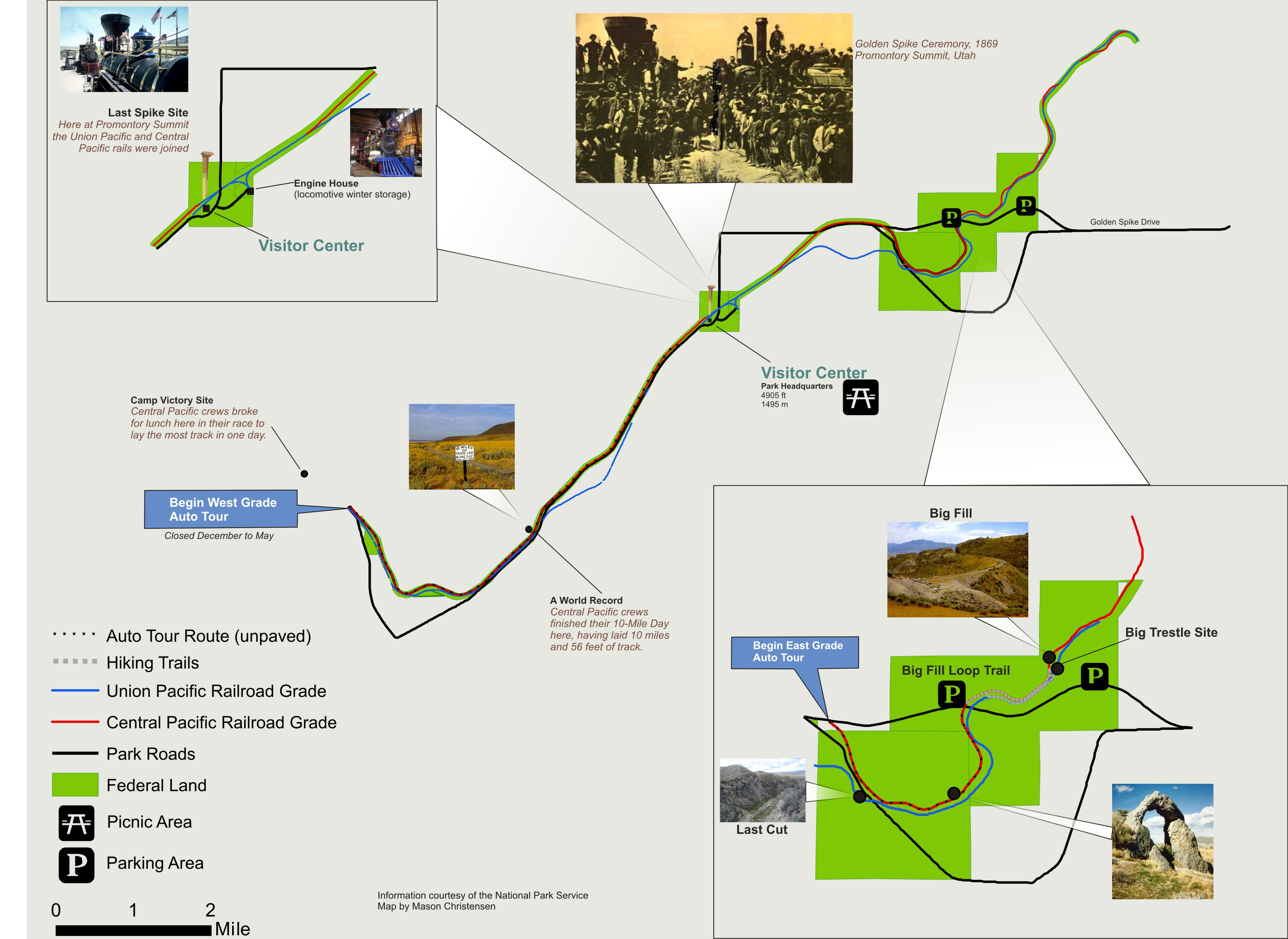
- Map of Golden Spike National Historical Park, whose grounds include the site of Camp Victory (where workers paused for lunch) and the end of the record-setting 10 miles of track laid in one day, west of the Visitor Center.

Overview
- Owner: Central Pacific Railroad

Service
- System: First transcontinental railroad

History
- Opened: 28 April 1869
- Closed: 1 January 1905

Technical
- Track length: 10.01 mi (16.11 km)
- Track gauge: 1,435 mm (4 ft 8 1/2 in) standard gauge

The tracklaying race of 1869 was an unofficial contest between tracklaying crews of the Union Pacific and Central Pacific railroads, held during the construction of the first transcontinental railroad. The competition was to determine who would first reach the meeting place at Promontory, Utah. Starting in 1868, the railroad crews set, and subsequently broke, each other's world records for the longest length of track laid in a single day. This culminated in the April 28, 1869, record set by Chinese and Irish crews of the Central Pacific who laid 10 miles 56 feet (16.111 km) of track in one day. That record was broken in August 1870, by about 1,000 feet (300 m), by two crews of the Kansas Pacific, working from opposite ends of the same track. (Note: A modern world record for length of track laid in a single day has been reported to be 4.35 miles (7.00 km), set during the construction of the Mount Newman railway on May 9, 1968. Prior to that, the record was reported to be 2.88 miles (4.63 km), set by a Santa Fe Railroad crew in 1962.)

== History ==
=== Rivalry ===
In July 1866, the Pacific Railway Act was amended, authorizing the Central Pacific (CP) to build east until it met the line being constructed by the Union Pacific (UP). The amount of land and money each railroad would be granted was proportional to the number of miles of track laid, causing the two railroads to start building in earnest.

Their rivalry was notably unfriendly. In February 1869, crews for the UP and CP were grading parallel routes on the Promontory Range. At that time, the UP's primarily Irish crews began bullying the CP's primarily Chinese crews, first throwing clods of earth and escalating to a series of raids in which the UP crews attempted to dislodge the CP by attacking while wielding pick handles. Eventually, the UP crews began setting off heavy charges without warning, seriously injuring several CP workers; when the CP crews began grading at a higher elevation, they retaliated by setting off a surprise explosion, which buried several UP workers alive.

=== Tracklaying ===
Building the railroad started with surveying the route and grading the roadbed; for the CP, grading was delayed by the route chosen through the rugged Sierra mountain range. During the first five years of construction, the CP spent only 95 weeks laying tracks, while the remainder had been consumed in grading.

In the CP's traditional approach to tracklaying, once the grading was complete, a loaded tracklaying car was sent to the end of the line, carrying a single crew and eight pairs of rails along with a commensurate number of ties, spikes, and splices. One pair of rails was unloaded at a time and the tracklaying car only advanced once the crew had completed that pair of rails. When the line curved, the rails were pre-bent (and the inside rail was shortened) before they were loaded onto the tracklaying car. The slow pace of the tracklaying car and limited manpower that could be brought to bear limited the CP to laying just 132 miles (212 km) of track during the first five years of construction from 1863 to 1868, building east from Sacramento, despite adopting speedier techniques for curved rails and splices in 1866.

Meanwhile, the UP had built 515 miles (829 km) from Omaha, Nebraska, west to Cheyenne, Wyoming, by 1868. In 1867, General Jack Casement of the UP described their current pace of laying 2 1/2 miles (4.0 km) of track per day as "a little slow at first, to get the new hands broke into their places" and confidently predicted they would double the rate to 5 miles (8.0 km) per day by the end of the summer. UP crews under Casement and his brother Daniel would lay 4 to 5 miles (6.4 to 8.0 km) of track in a single day in August 1867, prompting CP Vice President Collis P. Huntington to ask if they should send a spy to watch the UP at work.

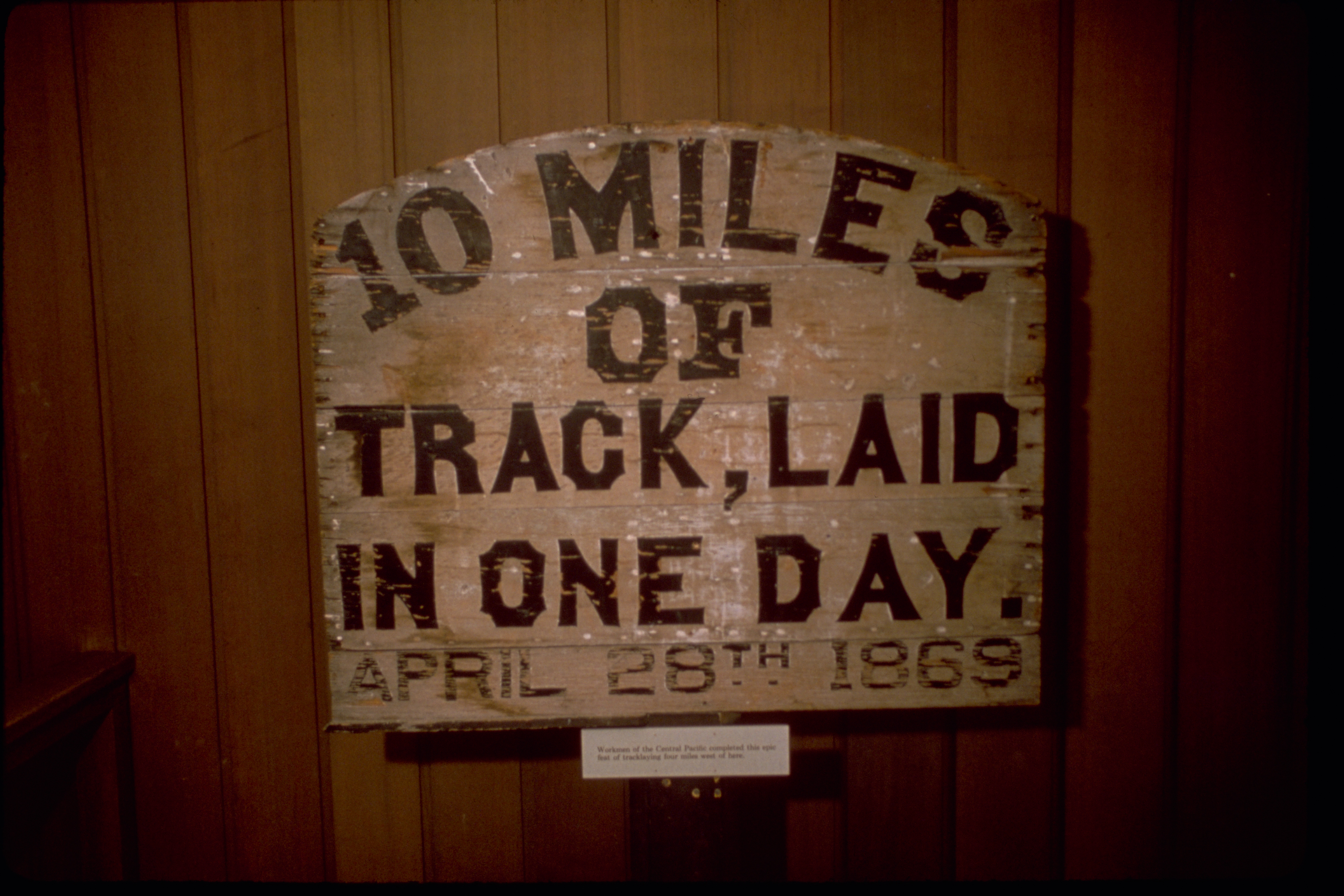
10-mile sign replica at Golden Spike National Historical Park Visitor Center

In March 1868, a former UP tracklayer joined the CP, happy to share the UP's technique to speed up tracklaying. Rather than have a single crew take on all aspects of tracklaying work, the crews of the Casement brothers were organized more like an assembly line: crews were specialized, employing more men in total, but having each man be responsible for a limited set of tasks such as rail handling, spiking, splicing, etc. In addition, the tracklaying car was advanced over the loose rails, before they were completely spiked in place, allowing work to take place simultaneously along a longer distance of track. One contemporary newspaper account described the UP process in military terms, with workers divided into armies of suppliers, graders, tie setters, and track-layers. Tracklaying in this fashion was limited mainly by supplies and supply lines, typically to 3 miles (4.8 km) per day. The rapid pace of the work was thought to be affecting its quality, but the tracks laid in this manner had no issues in passing mandatory government inspections, which were required to release funds to the UP.

=== Record-setting pace ===
On August 17, 1868, UP crews laid 4 1/2 miles (7.2 km) of track in a single day; their bragging aroused a competitive instinct in CP chief Charles Crocker, who instructed his construction superintendent James Harvey Strobridge to beat it. CP crews responded by laying a few feet beyond 6 miles (9.7 km) on August 19. UP's riposte was to lay 8 miles (13 km) of track in a single day on October 26, working from 3 a.m. until midnight.

The disparity in pace continued into 1869; on February 18, Oliver Ames Jr., president of UP, testified before the Congressional Pacific Railroad Committee, pointing out that while the CP was 200 miles (320 km) from the prearranged meeting spot in Ogden, Utah, the UP was only 30 miles (48 km) away, and should be entitled to continue building west past Ogden. CP's Huntington, also testifying that day, retorted UP's pace was purchased at the cost of quality. On March 12, 1869 Mark Hopkins sent the coded message "Roving Delia Fish Dance" to Huntington, letting him know his crews were laying 4 miles (6.4 km) of track per day regularly. This proved the production gains of adopting Casement's techniques and set the stage for the Ten Mile Day of April 28, 1869.

=== Ten Miles of Track, Laid in One Day ===
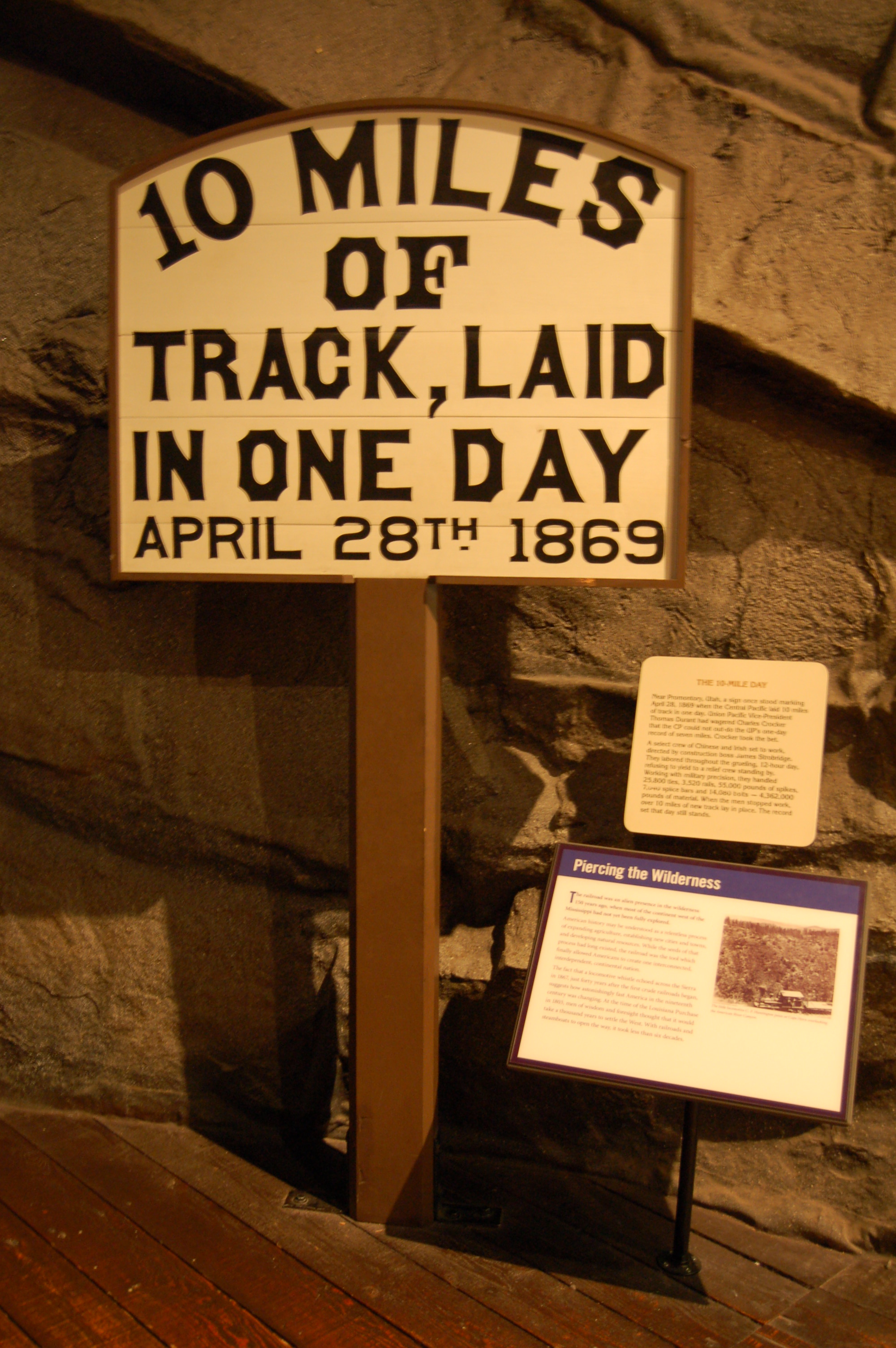
Replica sign in the California State Railroad Museum, Sacramento

As the two railroad companies approached the meeting point at Promontory Summit, the UP's advance slowed as some of the heaviest work was ahead; at one point, the UP graders were just 1/2 mile (0.80 km) ahead of the tracklaying crews. Thomas C. Durant, the vice-president of the UP, reportedly had a bet with Crocker for $10,000; the winner would be determined by whose crews could lay the most track in a single day, but there is no contemporary evidence to prove the bet existed. California Governor Leland Stanford had a much smaller wager of $500 with the chief track-layer, Horace Minkler, which Stanford was happy to pay.

The CP's first attempt at a tracklaying record was abandoned on April 27 after a locomotive derailed. The CP had laid 2 miles (3.2 km) of rails that day. At that point, the CP was just 14 miles (23 km) short of completing their section of the line, while the UP was 8 miles (13 km) from Promontory, ensuring that should the CP set the record, the UP would be unable to break it without taking up completed track.

The iron is all well up to the front; there is no longer a hesitancy of failure; the running of an engine off the track cannot retard us. I say "we," because I have become infected by the prevailing enthusiasm. I no longer look upon these gymnastic track-layers with the cold eye of a mere out sider; I no longer merely admire the well-trained artisans who follow them; I no longer accept logically the dexterous performances of the Chinese as a proof that the advanced opinion in relation to their usefulness has received upon this field irrefragable proofs of its correctness. By some process of reasoning unknown to me, I have become merged in the busy mass around.
The music of the regulated blocks of the spikedrivers falls deliciously on the ear; the steady advances of the ballasters excite the liveliest demonstrations on my part; the splendid drill of the supply trains behind I regard as something in which I have a personal interest; I have become a C.P. of the most violent and uncompromising kind; it is with difficulty that I can restrain myself from a demonstration of triumph that will compel the U.P.'.s sitting there alone by themselves, with long faces, and exchanging, to all appearances, lugubrious remarks, to sink right into their boots; and the pride which the Californian on such an occasion could not fail to feel is entirely justifiable. It is to some extent a contest between the East and West. The ostensible combat with that old and uncompromising demon who has been struggling for centuries to keep the peoples apart. The real tussle, at least to-day, is between the old, worn-out, debauched and dissipated East and the young, vigorous, enterprising, organizing, audacious West. No man could look upon the scenes which I have witnessed this day without rejoicing that his lot is cast by the setting sun.

— Daily Alta California, May 1, 1869

The next day, work began at daybreak. One railcar, fully loaded with eight pairs of 30-foot (9.1 m) rails, spikes, and other supplies, was pulled up to the end of the track by teams of horses; when it met an empty car returning to the supply base, the empty car was tipped on its side to allow the loaded car to pass. As the loaded car reached the end of the line, one pair of rails was pulled down and laid over the ties by a team of four rail handlers, then the car was advanced over the loose rails while another team of spikers started spikes to secure the rails. Additional teams finished the spiking and buried the ends of the ties.

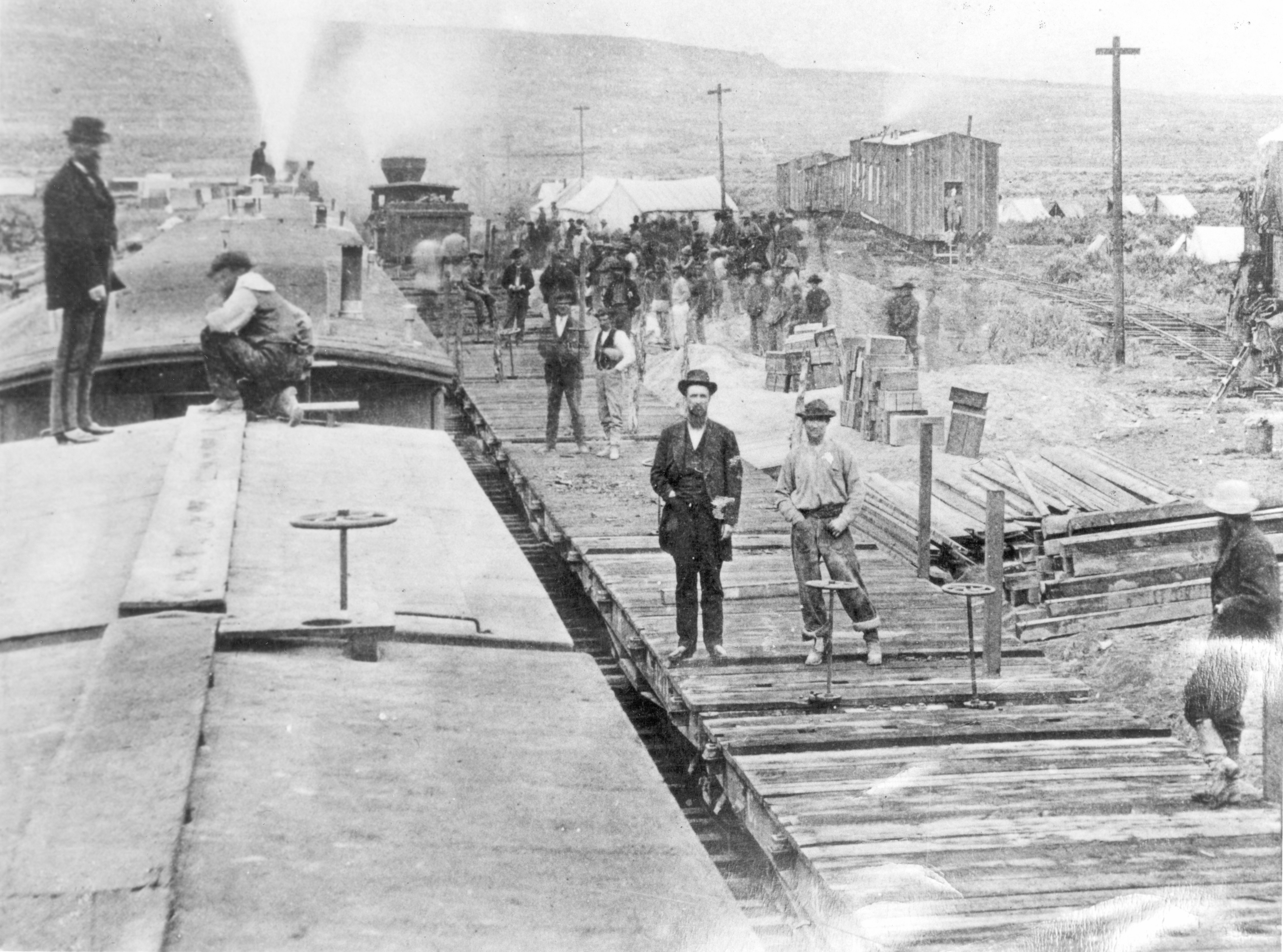
Strobridge and Minkler at Camp Victory, April 28, 1869. Photographed by Alfred A. Hart.

A correspondent for the Daily Alta California timed the pace for two carloads; the cars, each containing 240 feet (73 m) of track, were emptied in 80, then 75 seconds. By lunch, (Note: Various sources report that lunch was taken either at noon after 6 2/3 hours of work, or at 1:30 PM after 6 1/4 hours of work. The sources agree that 6 miles (9.7 km) were laid by the time the meal was taken. The Alta California further asserts that 2 miles (3.2 km) of track had been laid by 6 AM, supporting the earlier start time.) 6 miles (9.7 km) were complete, about six hours after work began.

The crews took an hour-long break to eat before resuming work, saucily naming the site Camp Victory. (Note: Camp Victory was later renamed as Rozel Station, where helper engines would be attached to trains crossing Promontory Summit. It is now a ghost town.) After lunch, an hour was spent bending rails for the upcoming route, a curving ascent. The eight-man rail-laying team refused to be relieved after lunch and continued their work hauling rails off the work cars. When work ceased at 7 p.m., the CP crews had laid 10 miles 56 feet (16.111 km) of track in a single day, (Note: According to the Daily Alta California, only eleven hours were spent laying tracks. George Kraus also asserted the work was accomplished in less than twelve hours. However, the same newspaper stated a day later that work had begun at daybreak; the timing of the meal (at noon) and the duration of the work already performed (6 2/3 hours) implies that work would have started at 5:20 AM. Anderson's unpublished history gives slightly different timings for the meal (1:30 PM) and duration (6 1/4 hours), meaning the work would have started at 7:15 AM. All sources agree that work ceased at 7 PM that day.) setting the record. To prove the track was sound, a locomotive was run over the newly laid track, completing the route in 40 minutes. CP crews completed the remainder of their part of the line to Promontory Summit the next day. In total, 25,800 ties, 3,520 rails (averaging 560 lb (250 kg) each), 55,000 spikes, and 14,080 bolts were used that day, consuming 4,462,000 lb (2,024,000 kg) of material.

A delegation from the Union Pacific had been invited to witness the record attempts. When the first attempt failed on April 27, the UP delegates privately expressed skepticism that their record could be broken; by the end of the Ten-Mile Day, one delegate admitted "the organization of the Central Pacific is far superior to [ours]".

Foreman George Coley's log book notes the names of the eight Irish rail-layers who hauled the rails off the loaded cars and the two men who gauged the track. The contribution of numerous Chinese workers was undeniable, although the roles they played were not well-described. The relationship between the Chinese and Irish crews of the CP was described as amicable.

== Legacy ==
Some of the UP crews who were denied a chance to break the CP record later worked on the Kansas Pacific, who set a new record with 10 miles 1,320 feet (16.496 km) laid in a single day at Comanche Crossing near Strasburg, Colorado on August 15, 1870, (Note: Unlike the earlier CP record of April 28, 1869, KP crews were working from both the west and east on August 15, 1870; the stated total of 10 1/4 miles (16.5 km) includes the work of both crews.) completing the first continuous transcontinental railroad. Still, the Southern Pacific (successor to the CP) continued to claim the record into the early 20th century.

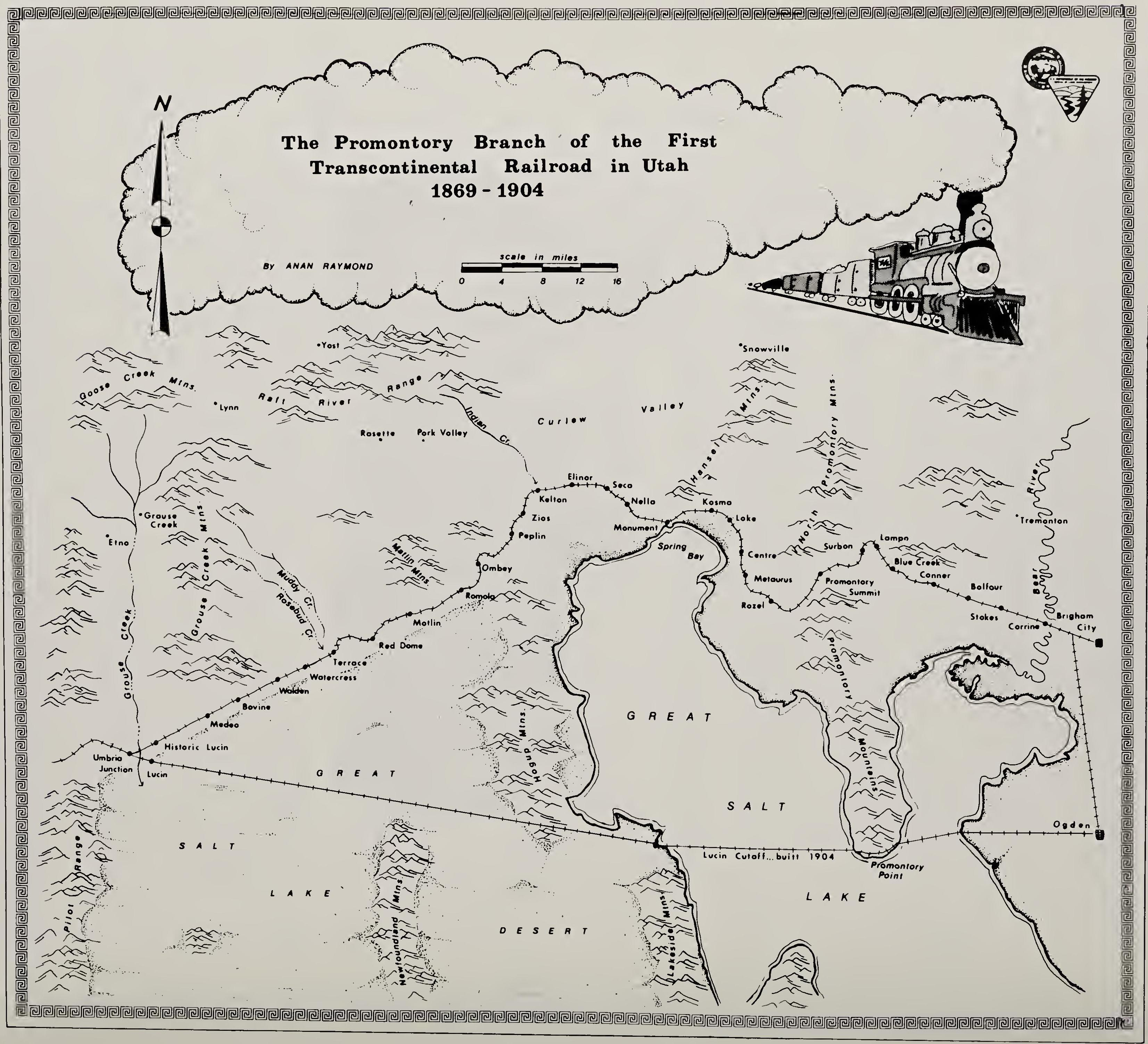
Map of the Promontory Branch and Lucin Cutoff, drawn by Aran Raymond (1981). Rozel (Camp Victory) and Promontory Summit are labeled on the map.

The ten-mile rail segment laid in 1869 (and the Promontory Golden Spike site) was bypassed in 1903 with the completion of the Lucin Cutoff, although service continued for several years on the original route, which the Southern Pacific called its Promontory Branch. The abandoned rails were eventually taken up for scrap and reuse in 1942. At the Golden Spike National Historical Park, the West Auto Tour is a 7-mile (11 km) route that takes tourists to a replica of the sign erected by the CP at the site to commemorate the April 28 record. The original sign is thought to be in the Utah State Capitol building in Salt Lake City; a replacement sign that may have stood at the site is on display at the visitor center in Promontory, and a replica is displayed at the California State Railroad Museum in Sacramento.

=== In art ===
April 28, 1869, is a prominent day in author Frank Chin's 1991 novel Donald Duk; the eponymous protagonist dreams of the events of that day and awakens, outraged to find that history has recorded only the names of the eight Irish tracklayers who worked that day. (Note: There are two quotes in Donald Duk at the end of Chapter 14, on page 122. The credit for these quotes is not provided in that text, but they are taken from Griswold (1962).)
