= Bagley train wreck =

1944 train crash on the Great Salt Lake, Utah, USA

Details
- Date: 31 December 1944; 5:14 am
- Location: Bagley, west of Ogden, Utah
- Coordinates: 41.238577°N 112.310196°W
- Country: United States
- Line: Lucin Cutoff
- Operator: Southern Pacific
- Incident type: Rear-end collision
- Cause: signal passed at danger, foggy conditions

Statistics
- Trains: 2
- Deaths: 50
- Injured: 81

Train consists
December 31, 1944
- Train: First #21, Pacific Limited
- Locomotive SP 4425 (class GS-3), leading: 1. UP 2044 mail storage car 2. SP 6333 baggage-express car 3. SP 5197 baggage-mail car 4. SP 6447 baggage-express car 5. SP 6093 baggage-express car 6. USA 89012 military hospital car 7. USA 89000 military hospital car 8. SP 1192 coach 9. UP 5325 coach 10. SP 2174 coach 11. UP 5339 coach 12. SP 1147 coach 13. SP 1264 coach 14. UP 1251 coach 15. SP 10102 dining car 16. Pullman 4263 tourist sleeping car 17. Fallon Pullman sleeping car 18. Lake Cushman Pullman sleeping car
- Train: Second #21, Pacific Limited
- Locomotive SP 4361 (class Mt-4), leading: 1. CNW 68012 box-express car 2. UP 9163 box-express car 3. UP 9165 box-express car 4. CBQ 1381 mail storage car 5. CBQ 8283 mail storage car 6. NYC 8027 baggage car 7. CBQ 8159 mail storage car 8. CBQ 1464 baggage car 9. CBQ 8007 mail storage car 10. PFE 165 express refrigerator car 11. PFE 527 express refrigerator car 12. CBQ 8532 express car 13. PRR 9561 box-express car 14. PRR 51427 box-express car 15. UP 9220 box-express car 16. CBQ 8508 express car 17. SP 6335 baggage-express car 18. CBQ 8246 mail storage car 19. UP 2042 mail storage car 20. SP 2691 coach

The Bagley train wreck (also known as the Great Salt Lake wreck) occurred in Utah, United States, on the morning of Sunday December 31, 1944. The crash killed 50 (initially reported as 48), including over 35 military personnel, and injured 81.

== Pacific Limited ==
The wreck involved Southern Pacific's Pacific Limited as it crossed the Great Salt Lake on the Lucin Cutoff. It had departed from Chicago at 10 a.m. the prior Friday (Dec 29), bound for San Francisco and normally traveled in one long section, but on this occasion it was split into two, with the passenger train running ahead of the mail express.

Early that morning an unusually long and heavy freight train developed problems (unofficially a hot box) whilst traveling west from Ogden. This required First 21, the first section of the Pacific Limited comprising 18 cars headed by SP GS-3 No. 4425, to stop and then proceed with caution. Second 21, the second section comprising 20 cars headed by SP Mt-4 No. 4361, apparently unaware of the problems ahead, continued at full speed.

First 21 departed Ogden at 4:38 a.m. (38 minutes after its scheduled departure) and had slowed to 8 mph (13 km/h) at the time of the collision, preparing to stop in response to the flagman's signals from the preceding freight train. Second 21 departed Ogden at 4:50 a.m. (50 minutes late) and passed two stop signals before the collision. At Bagley, a siding 17 miles (27 km) west of Ogden, at 5:14 a.m. in thick fog, the Second 21 mail express train, moving at 50 mph (80 km/h), crashed into the Pullman car at the back of the First 21 passenger train.

The Ogden Standard-Examiner reported "The force of the impact sent another sleeping car smashing through the dining car and farther ahead slammed one coach into the wooden coach ahead of it. Cars of the mail express section piled up crossways of the track behind the engine, some of them sliding down the causeway embankment into water. Most of the dead were taken from the rear Pullman car and from the telescoped coach." Several cars in First 21 telescoped: the thirteenth into the twelfth, the sixteenth into the fifteenth, and the locomotive of Second 21 into the eighteenth. The twelfth, fifteenth, and eighteenth cars of First 21 were demolished, and the locomotive and first eleven cars of Second 21 were derailed.

=== Aftermath and investigation ===
At the site of the crash, the tracks run along a causeway across desolate mud and shallow water, so all rescue efforts had to come by rail. Two hospital cars were included in the passenger train (First 21) manned by members of the Medical Corps and tended the injured until rescue trains arrived from Ogden.

The official inquiry into the accident concluded 'this accident was caused by failure to properly control the speed of the following train in accordance with signal indications.' First 21 had seen the two preceding stop signals and its engineers were preparing to halt when that train was struck by Second 21. After the fireman on Second 21 missed the first stop signal due to heavy fog, he reported the missed signal to the engineer; the fireman then saw the second stop signal and relayed it to the engineer, but did not witness the engineer of Second 21 respond by slowing the train. Most of the crew of Second 21 were resting in the rearmost car and were not aware of any issues until the brakes were applied, approximately 12 seconds before the collision. Both the engineer of Second 21 and the flagman of First 21 were killed.

Although the engineer of Second 21 had applied the brakes, the position in which he was found indicated that he had been incapacitated prior to the collision. A coroner's inquest concluded the engineer had died from sudden shock or heart failure just before the crash.
