= Promontory Point, Utah =

- Ghost town
- Location within the State of Utah Location within the United States
- Coordinates: 41°13′20″N 112°24′41″W
- Country: United States
- State: Utah
- County: Box Elder
- Elevation: 4,219 ft (1,286 m)
- Time zone: UTC-7 (Mountain (MST))
  - Summer (DST): UTC-6 (MDT)
- GNIS feature ID: 1431484

Promontory Point is a ghost town in Box Elder County, Utah, United States, that is located about 1.7 miles (2.7 km) northeast of the cape with the same name.

== Description ==
The site is where the Lucin Cutoff intersects the east coast of the peninsula formed where the Promontory Mountains project into the northern Great Salt Lake. The cutoff passes 1,250 feet (380 m) north of the cape and continues west 6.4 miles (10.3 km) to Saline, where the cutoff leaves the peninsula.

Promontory Point served as a quarry for the construction of the Lucin Cutoff and later as a station for the Southern Pacific Railroad beginning in 1901.

The unincorporated community of Promontory and its location, Promontory Summit, are also frequently referred to as "Promontory Point". Promontory Summit is the site where the First transcontinental railroad was completed on May 10, 1869, and is located about 30 miles (48 km) north–northwest of Promontory Point, near the north end of the Promontory Mountains.

== See also ==
- List of ghost towns in Utah
