= Fae Myenne Ng =

American writer

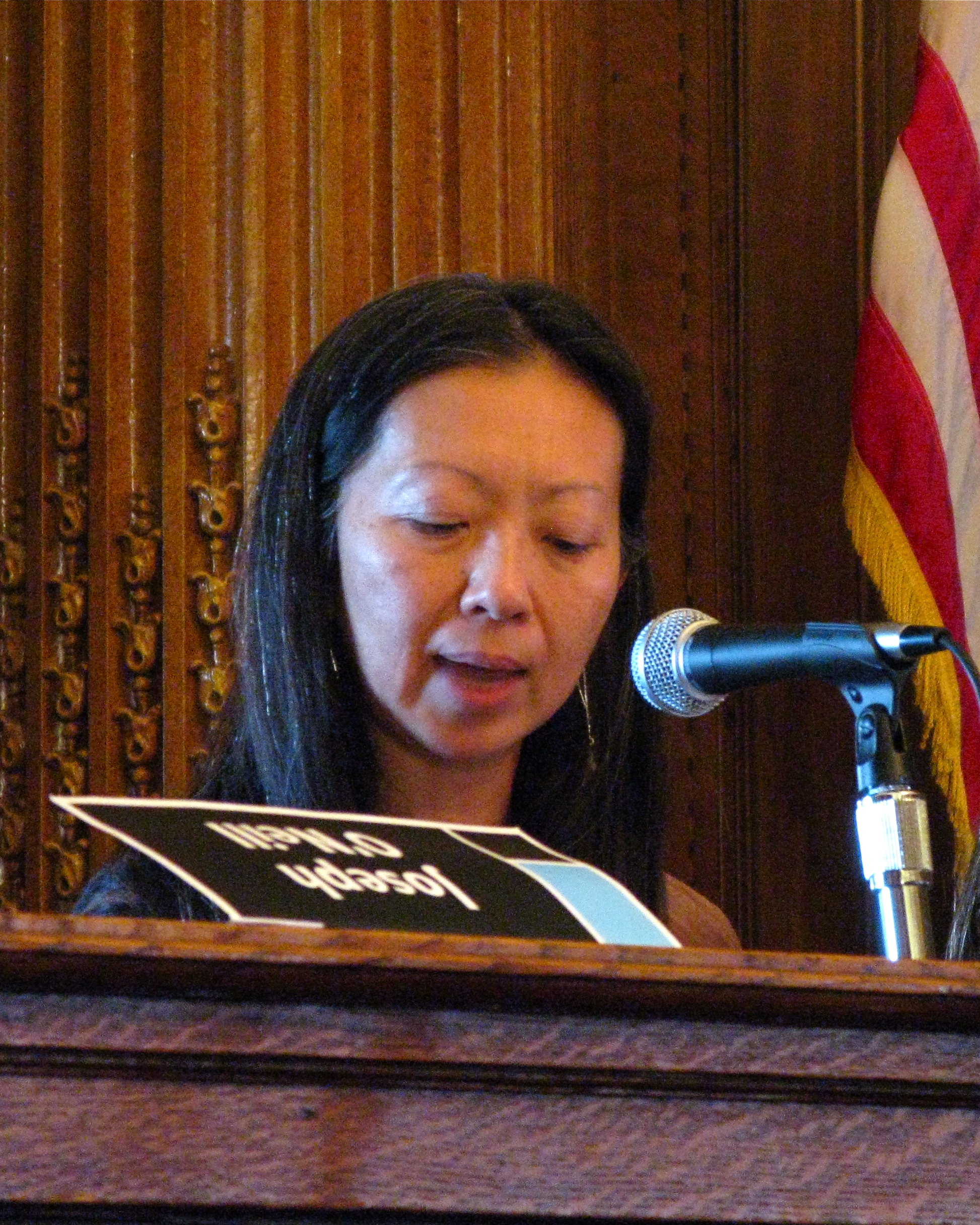
- Fae Myenne Ng at the Brooklyn Book Festival
- Born: December 2, 1956 (age 69); San Francisco, California, U.S.
- Education: University of California, Berkeley; Columbia University (MFA)

Fae Myenne Ng (born December 2, 1956 in San Francisco) is an American novelist and short story writer.

She is a first-generation Chinese American author whose debut novel Bone told the story of three Chinese American daughters growing up in her real childhood hometown of San Francisco Chinatown. Her work has received support from the American Academy of Arts & Letters' Rome Prize, the Lila Wallace Reader's Digest Writers' Award, the National Endowment for the Arts, the Lannan Foundation, and The Radcliffe Institute. She has held residencies at Yaddo, McDowell, and the Djerassi Foundation.

== Life ==
She is the daughter of seamstress and a laborer, who immigrated from Guangzhou, China. She attended the University of California, Berkeley, and received her M.F.A. at Columbia University. Ng has supported herself by working as a waitress and at other temporary jobs. She teaches UC Berkeley AAADS 20C.

Her short stories have appeared in The American Voice, Calyx, City Lights Review, Crescent Review, and Harper's Magazine. She currently teaches at UC Berkeley and UCLA in the English and Asian American Studies departments.

== Awards ==
- nominated and finalist for the PEN/Faulkner Award, for Bone
- grant by the National Endowment for the Arts.
- 2008 American Book Award for Steer Toward Rock
- 2009 Guggenheim Fellowship

== Works ==
- Bone, Hyperion, 1993
- Steer Toward Rock. Hyperion. 2008. ISBN 978-0-7868-6097-5. "Fae Myenne Ng."
- Orphan Bachelors. Grove, 2023. ISBN 978-0-8021-6222-9.

== Anthologies ==
- Jessica Tarahata Hagedorn, ed. (1993). Charlie Chan is dead: an anthology of contemporary Asian American fiction. Penguin Books. ISBN 978-0-14-023111-3.
- Sylvia Watanabe; Carol Bruchac, eds. (1990). Home to stay: Asian American women's fiction. Greenfield Review Press. ISBN 978-0-912678-76-4.
- Shawn Wong, ed. (1996). Asian American literature: a brief introduction and anthology. HarperCollins College Pub. ISBN 978-0-673-46977-9.

== Sources ==
- University of Minnesota biography and review
- "Author Interviews: Fae Myenne Ng", August 14, 2008
