= Promontory Mountains =

Mountain range in Box Elder County, Utah, United States

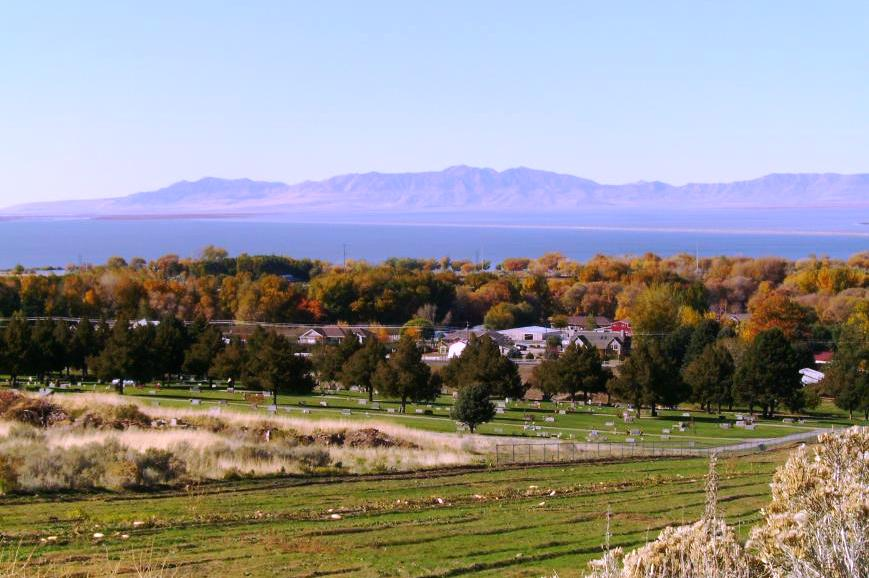
- Promontory Mountains from the east shore of Willard Bay north of Ogden

Highest point
- Peak: Messix Peak
- Elevation: 7,349 ft (2,240 m)
- Coordinates: 41°29′25″N 112°30′30″W

Dimensions
- Length: 35 mi (56 km) north to south

Geography
- Location within Utah
- Country: United States
- State: Utah

The Promontory Mountains are a range in Box Elder County, Utah. The range is oriented north–south and has a length of about 35 miles (56 km). The southern portion forms a cape extending 20 miles (32 km) south into the Great Salt Lake. The First transcontinental railroad was completed with the Golden Spike just north of the range at Promontory Summit in the Utah Territory. Today, trains cross the Promontory Point at the southern tip of the range via the Lucin Cutoff railroad causeway across the lake.

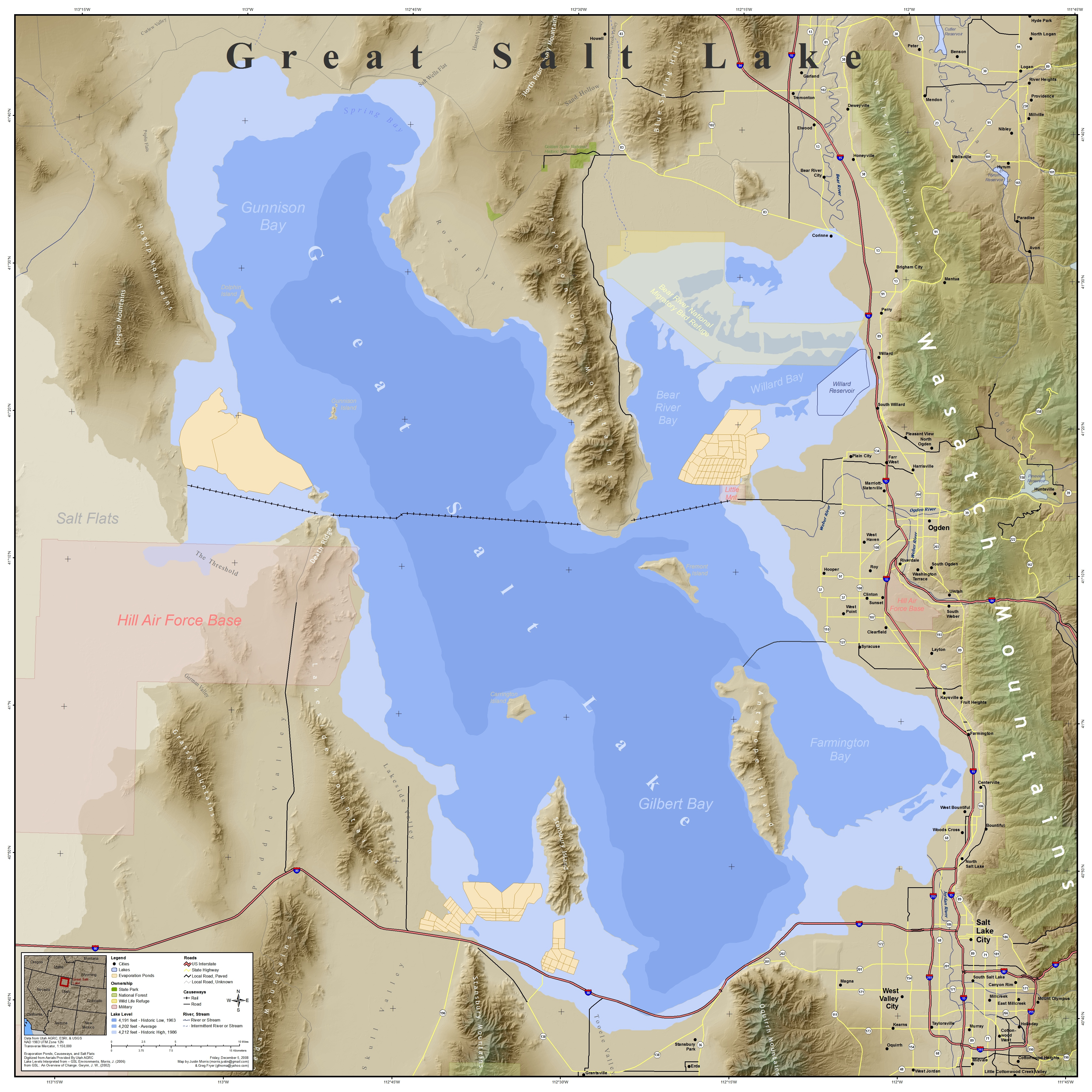
The Great Salt Lake is to the west and south of the Promontory Mountains.

== Geology ==
The Promontory Mountains are a block fault range typical of the Basin and Range Province. The west side of the range is bounded by the East Great Salt Lake normal fault which passes under the lake along the west side of Antelope Island and on to the south shore of the lake to the west side of the Oquirrh Mountains where it continues on strike as the Oquirrh Fault. The East Antelope Island fault runs from the east side of Antelope Island to the north beneath the lake to the east side of the Promentaries where it continues as the East Promontory Mountains fault zone. These two fault systems parallel the larger Wasatch Fault which runs to the east of Great Salt Lake. The faults are normal faults which dip to the west.

== History ==
The Promontory Mountains of 35 mi (56 km) were bypassed by the First transcontinental railroad in 1869, which came just north of it at Promontory Summit. The replacement 1904 Lucin Cutoff trestle crossed the southern tip of the mountains at Promontory Point, and the trestle was replaced in 1959 by an earthern causeway.
