= Lucin Cutoff =

Railroad line from Ogden to Lucin, Utah, United States

- Southern Pacific Railroad: Ogden-Lucin Cut-Off Trestle
- Formerly listed on the U.S. National Register of Historic Places
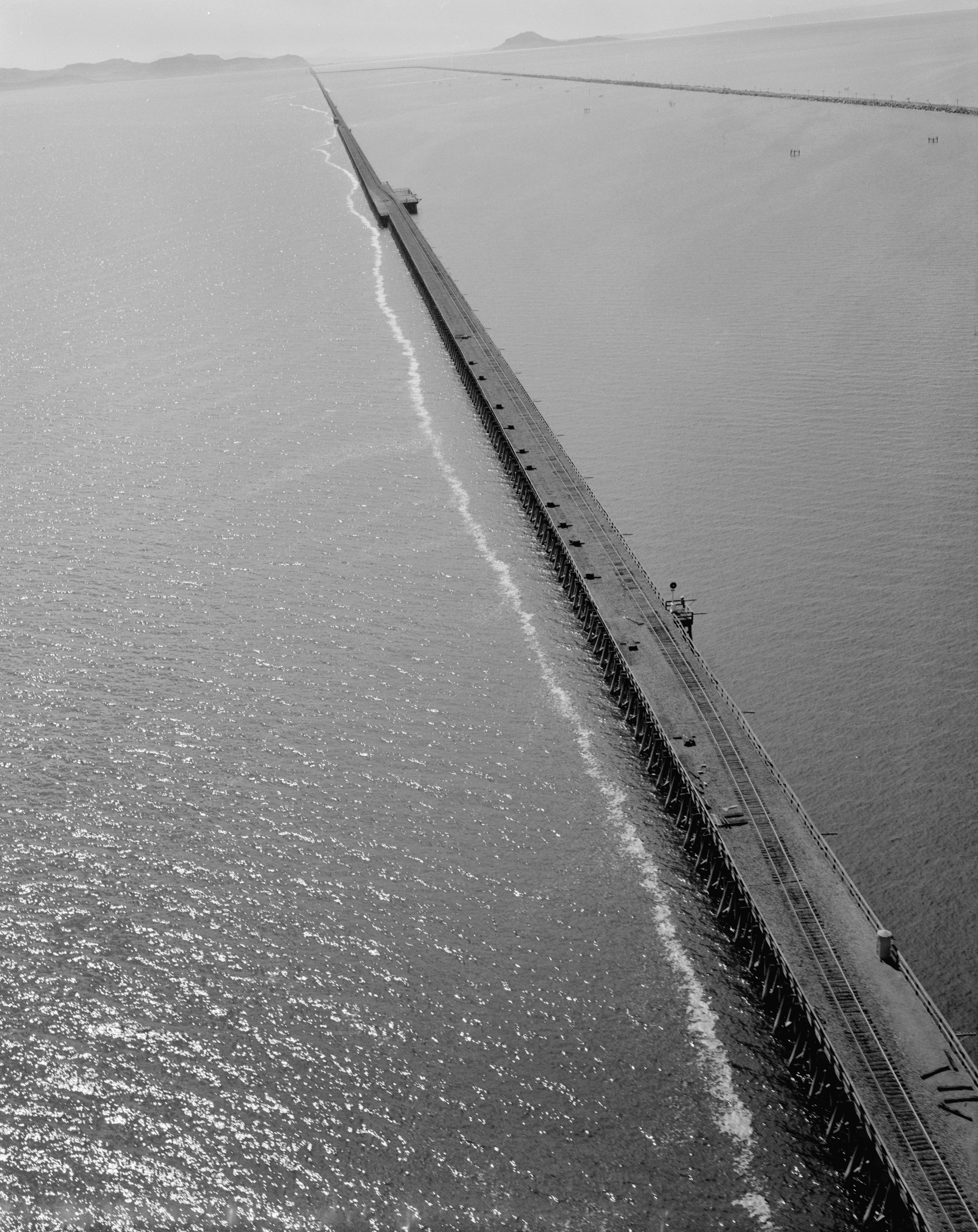
- Aerial view of the Lucin Cutoff trestle before removal. The 1950s causeway is to the right of the trestle.

- Location within Utah Location within the United States
- Nearest city: Ogden, Utah
- Coordinates: 41°13′0″N 112°41′40″W
- Area: 143 acres (58 ha)
- Built: 1902–1904
- Architect: William Hood
- NRHP reference No.: 72001257

Significant dates
- Added to NRHP: April 14, 1972
- Removed from NRHP: October 23, 2018

The Lucin Cutoff is a 102-mile (164 km) railroad line in Utah, United States that runs from Ogden to its namesake in Lucin. The most prominent feature of the cutoff was a twelve-mile-long (19 km) railroad trestle crossing the Great Salt Lake, which was in use from 1904 until the late 1950s, when it was replaced by an earthen causeway.

The cutoff was originally built by the Southern Pacific Railroad as a means of shortening the First transcontinental railroad. Today the cutoff is owned and operated by the Union Pacific Railroad as a significant part of the Lakeside Subdivision, which runs from Ogden to Wells, Nevada, and is one of the many subdivisions of the Overland Route. Due to the obstruction of water flow caused by the Lucin Cutoff, the Great Salt Lake appears to be different colors in aerial photographs; water north of the Cutoff appears red or brown, while water south of the Cutoff is more green.

== History ==
=== 1900s–1950s ===
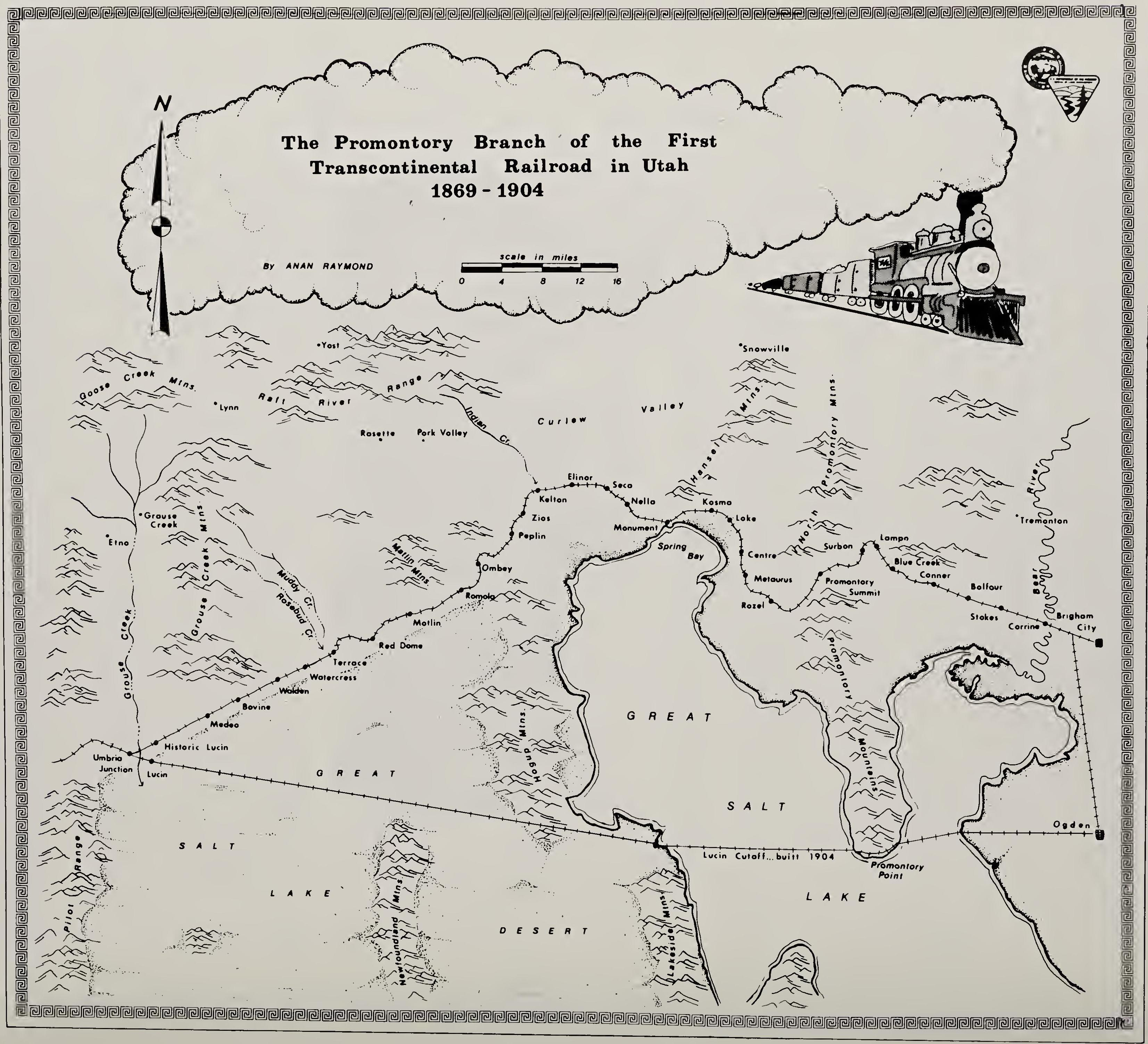
Lucin Cutoff (1903) compared to earlier Promontory Branch (1869). Drawn by Anan Raymond, 1981.

Built by the Southern Pacific Company (SP) between February 1902 and March 1904, the cutoff bypassed the original Central Pacific Railroad route through Promontory Summit where the golden spike was driven in 1869. By going west across the lake from Ogden to Lucin, it cut 44 miles (71 km) off the original route and also significantly decreased curvature and grades. Built under the direction of SP chief engineer William Hood, a team of 3,000 SP workers worked seven days a week to build the line. When the line opened, it included short causeways extending from the western shore of the lake and the edge of Promontory Point, connected with a nearly twelve-mile-long (19 km) wooden trestle. The cutoff also included a causeway which spanned Bear River Bay from the eastern shore of the lake to Promontory Point. This section included a 600-foot-long (180 m) trestle to allow Bear River water to flow into the lake. By 1908, five passenger trains and seven freight trains were using the Lucin Cutoff in each direction daily.

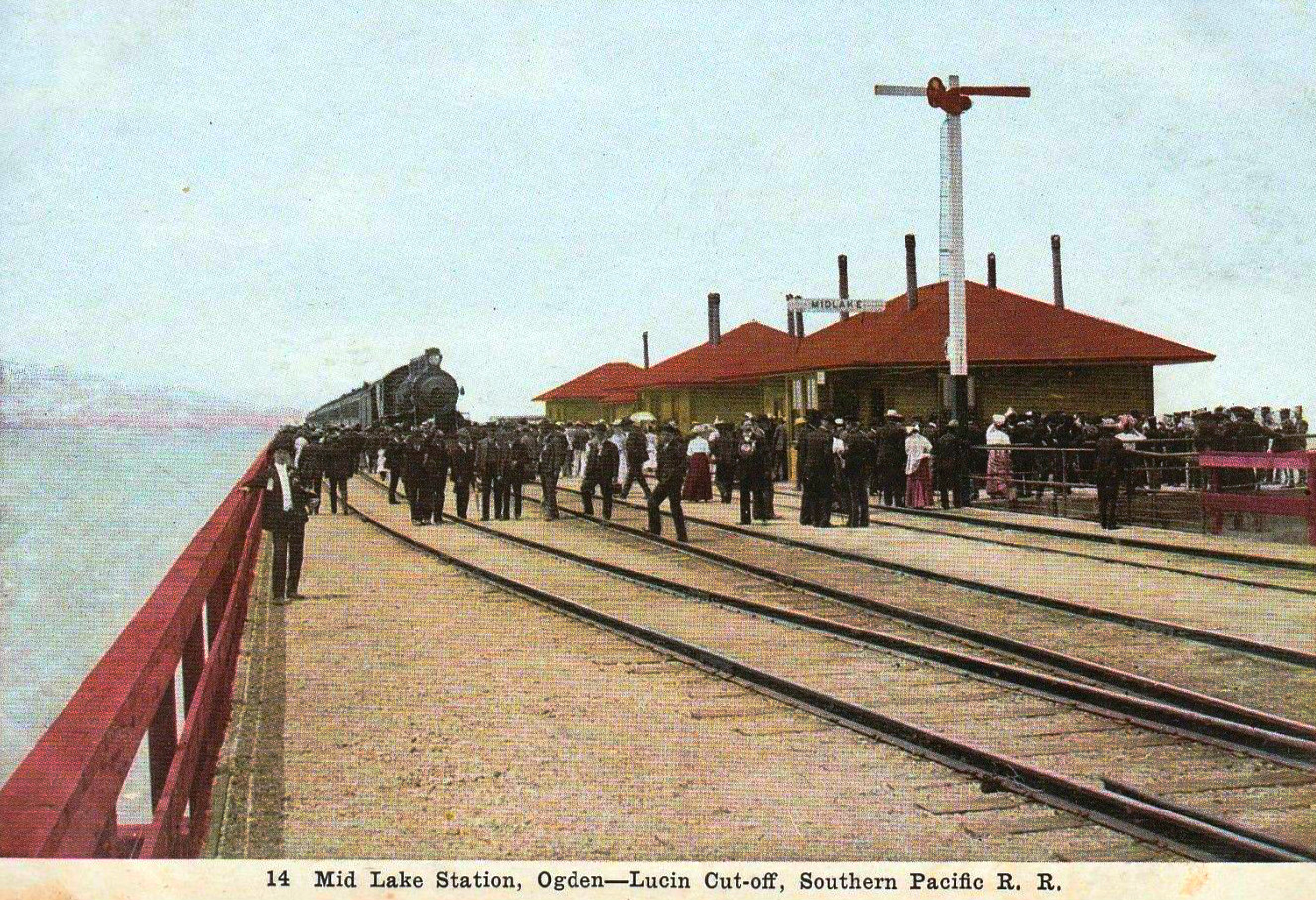
The line included a rail station called Mid Lake, which was in the middle of the Great Salt Lake.

The cutoff received its first modification a few months after opening. Fill was placed underneath the tracks to reduce their sagging. This was completed six months later.

In 1920, a project began to replace the trestle's deck and construct additional bracing. It was completed by 1927.

In 1929, the eastern causeway was widened. Additionally, the Midlake station was closed after being effectively replaced by the bridge station. However, its buildings were kept in place to serve as living quarters for the signal operators.

In 1932, two more piles were added to each bay next to the trestles, and 2,038 bracing piles were added.

In 1941, the telegraph building at the Midlake station was reopened as part of World War II related military operations.

In 1942, the original track between Lucin and Corinne, Utah was removed, including the remaining spikes on Promontory Point, and the scrap metal was donated to the war effort.

In late 1944, the Cutoff was the site of a train wreck in which 48 people were killed. A westbound mail express train ran into the back of a slower moving passenger train in thick fog.

In 1945, the Midlake station was razed and demolished as part of an upgrade to centralized traffic control.

=== 1950s–present ===
By the 1940s, it had become apparent that the old trestle was functionally obsolete, a choke point due to only having one track, and deteriorated to the point where much more money was spent on it than deemed acceptable. Because of this, construction on earthen causeway to bypass the structure began in 1955. It would be a parallel dirt and rock causeway that connected to the existing ones. It was built under contract by Morrison-Knudsen of Boise, Idaho. The new construction was opened to use by freight by late 1959, at which point the old trestle was restricted and improvements ceased.

In the mid-1970s, the trestle was abandoned after it had become too deteriorated for continued use.

The causeway prevented lake water from flowing as freely as the open trestle had, and to help mitigate effects, two culverts were included in the original causeway construction. The culverts allowed for boat traffic and a limited amount of water to flow from the lake's southern arm (where surrounding freshwater rivers emptied into the lake) into the lake's northern arm. In the early 1980s, Utah experienced heavy flooding, and much of the extra water along the Wasatch Front flowed into the Great Salt Lake. This resulted in the lake experiencing historic high water levels and flooding nearby landowners. To aid the two culverts in channeling water to the northern arm, the State of Utah constructed a 300-foot-long (90 m) bridge at the western end of the causeway. The state breached the causeway under the new bridge on August 1, 1984, allowing pent-up water from the southern arm to flow into the northern arm.

In 1986, the causeway was almost entirely rebuilt after flooding caused its filling to sink into the water. This included placing 1,430 surplus railcars along the northern edge of the causeway and filling them with rock to act as gabions (this feature is known as the "Boxcar Seawall.")

In 1996, the Southern Pacific railroad was merged into the Union Pacific Railroad (UP); with this, the cutoff too became its property.

In 1993, the railroad sold salvage rights to the trestle and Cannon Structures, Inc., through its Trestlewood division, and began to dismantle it. Work on demolishing the trestle itself was completed by 2000. Trestlewood continues to market and sell the salvaged trestle wood.

In March 2011, the UP requested permission to close the two 1950s-era culverts because of damage related to age and a sinking of the causeway into the lake bed; the two culverts were closed in 2012 and 2013. To mitigate the effects, the railroad was required to build a bridge and breach the causeway under that bridge. Construction of a 180-foot-long (55 m) bridge was completed in fall 2016, although the railroad agreed to delay opening the breach for a few months, due to environmental and water level concerns. The causeway was breached beneath the 180-foot bridge on December 1, 2016. Since the opening of the causeway the level of the water in the arms of the lake has begun to equalize. As of April 30, 2017, the level of the lake in the northern arm is within a foot of the southern arm.

Due to the Southwestern North American megadrought, the amount of fresh water flowing into the southern arm of the lake had dropped significantly enough that, during the summer of 2022, a 4-foot-high (1.2 m) berm was constructed in the breach beneath the 2016 bridge. This berm slows the flow of saltier water from the northern arm of the lake into the southern arm, as the increased salinity was beginning to have effects on the ecology of the southern part of the lake. Even though the lake's elevation in the southern part remained slightly higher than the northern part, the saltier water in the northern arm (which is denser and heavier) was able to push along the bottom of the breach into the southern arm of the lake. The berm was raised higher in 2023, but then lowered in 2024 as the level changed. As of 2024, it is the policy of the Office of the Great Salt Lake Commissioner to raise the berm anytime the southern arm's level falls to 4,190 feet (1,280 m) or lower.

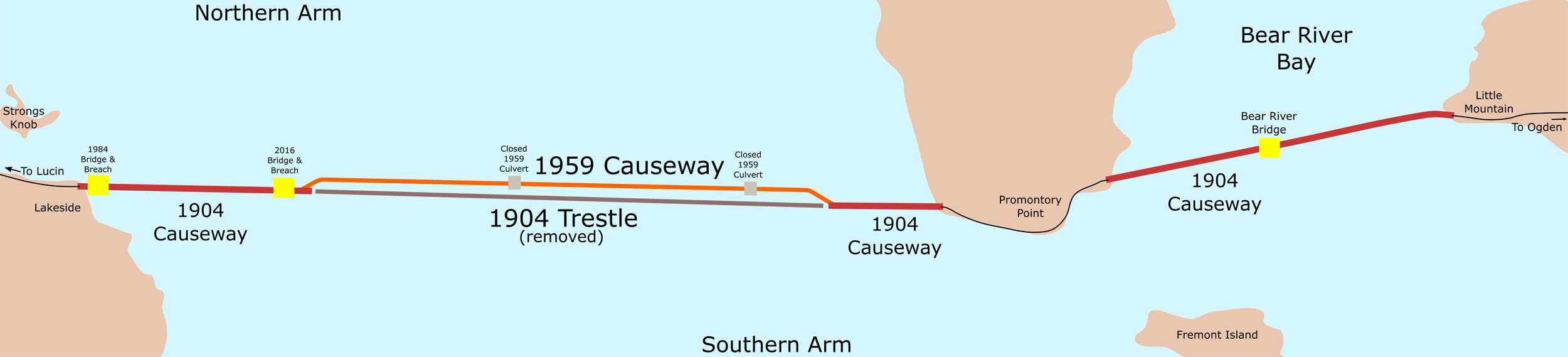
2016 map of the Cutoff as it crosses the Great Salt Lake (includes past and present features)

== See also ==
- List of bridges documented by the Historic American Engineering Record in Utah
- National Register of Historic Places listings in Box Elder County, Utah
