= Promontory, Utah =

Area of high ground in Box Elder County, Utah

Coordinates: 41°37′07″N 112°32′51″W

Promontory
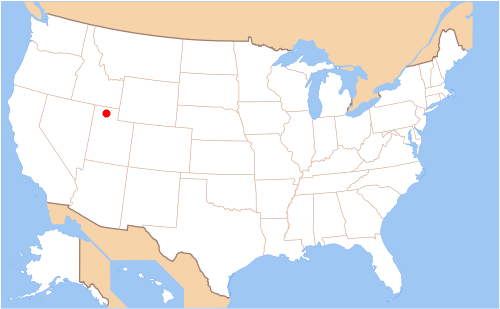
- Location of Promontory, Utah

- Andrew J. Russell's picture recording the meeting of the first transcontinental railroad in the United States

Overview
- Locale: Box Elder County, Utah
- Dates of operation: May 10, 1869–September 1942
- Successor: Lucin Cutoff, January 1905

Technical
- Track gauge: 4 ft 8 1/2 in (1,435 mm) standard gauge

Other
- Website: Golden Spike National Historic Site

Promontory is an area of high ground in Box Elder County, Utah, United States, 32 mi (51 km) west of Brigham City and 66 mi (106 km) northwest of Salt Lake City. Rising to an elevation of 4,902 feet (1,494 m) above sea level, it lies to the north of the Promontory Mountains and the Great Salt Lake. It is notable as the location of Promontory Summit, where the first transcontinental railroad in the United States, from Sacramento to Omaha, was officially completed on May 10, 1869. The location is sometimes confused with Promontory Point, a location further south along the southern tip of the Promontory Mountains. Both locations are significant to the Overland Route: Promontory Summit was where the original, now abandoned, alignment crossed just north of the Promontory Mountains; while Promontory Point is where the modern alignment, called the Lucin Cutoff, crosses the southern tip of the Promontory Mountains.

By the summer of 1868, the Central Pacific (CP) had completed the first rail route through the Sierra Nevada mountains, and was now moving down towards the Interior Plains and the Union Pacific (UP) line. More than 4,000 workers, of whom two thirds were Chinese, had laid more than 100 mi (160 km) of track at altitudes above 7,000 ft (2,100 m). In May 1869, the railheads of the Union Pacific and the Central Pacific railroads finally met at Promontory Summit, Utah Territory. A specially-chosen Chinese and Irish crew had taken only 12 hours to lay the final 10 mi (16 km) of track in time for the ceremony.

== Golden Spike ==
Promontory Summit, Utah Territory, had been agreed upon as the point where the two railheads would officially meet, following meetings in Washington, D.C., in April 1869, where it was also agreed that a ceremony would be held to drive in the Last Spike to commemorate the occasion. However, the original date of May 8 had to be postponed for two days because of bad weather and a labor dispute on the Union Pacific side. Over 400 laid-off unpaid graders and tie cutters chained U.P.R.R. Vice-President Thomas Durant's dignitary railcar to a siding in Piedmont, Wyoming, until he wired for money to pay them. After almost a two-day delay, when Durant's train arrived at the Devil's Gate Bridge in Wyoming, floodwaters turned a mild creek into a raging torrent, which threatened to collapse the railroad bridge. The engineer would not take his locomotive, whose number is lost to history, across the rickety structure, but he gave each of the passenger cars a hefty heave. The cars coasted across, but Durant no longer had a way to get to Promontory. A hasty telegraph to Ogden, Utah Territory, sent Union Pacific's engine "119" to the rescue. After a hearty party in Ogden the night of May 9, the dignitaries arrived at Promontory Summit on the morning of May 10, where the Golden Spike Ceremony was finally planned and took place, with the last iron spike driven at 12:47 PM.

The trains carrying the railroads' officials were drawn by Union Pacific's No. 119 and Central Pacific's No. 60 (officially named the Jupiter) locomotives, neither of which had been originally chosen for the ceremony. The Central Pacific had originally chosen their no. 29 Antelope to attend the ceremony, while the Union Pacific had also chosen another, unidentified engine for their train, but both engines encountered mishaps en route to the ceremony. On May 10, the Jupiter and 119 were drawn up face-to-face on Promontory Summit, separated only by the width of a single tie. It is unknown how many people attended the event; estimates run from as low as 500 to as many as 3,000 government and railroad officials and track workers. The lack of Chinese workers seen in the official portrait has been ascribed to anti-Chinese sentiment in the United States. However, their absence may have been the result of the timing of the famous photograph:

The more famous A.J. Russell photograph could not include the Chinese workers photographed earlier participating in the joining of the rails ceremony, because at the moment the famous photo was being taken it was after the conclusion of the ceremony and the Chinese workers were away from the two locomotives to dine at J.H. Strobridge's boarding car, being honored and cheered by the CPRR (Central Pacific Railroad) management.

Three of the eight Chinese workers who brought up the last rail were guests of honor at the Promontory Summit's golden anniversary celebrations in Ogden, Utah in May 1919.

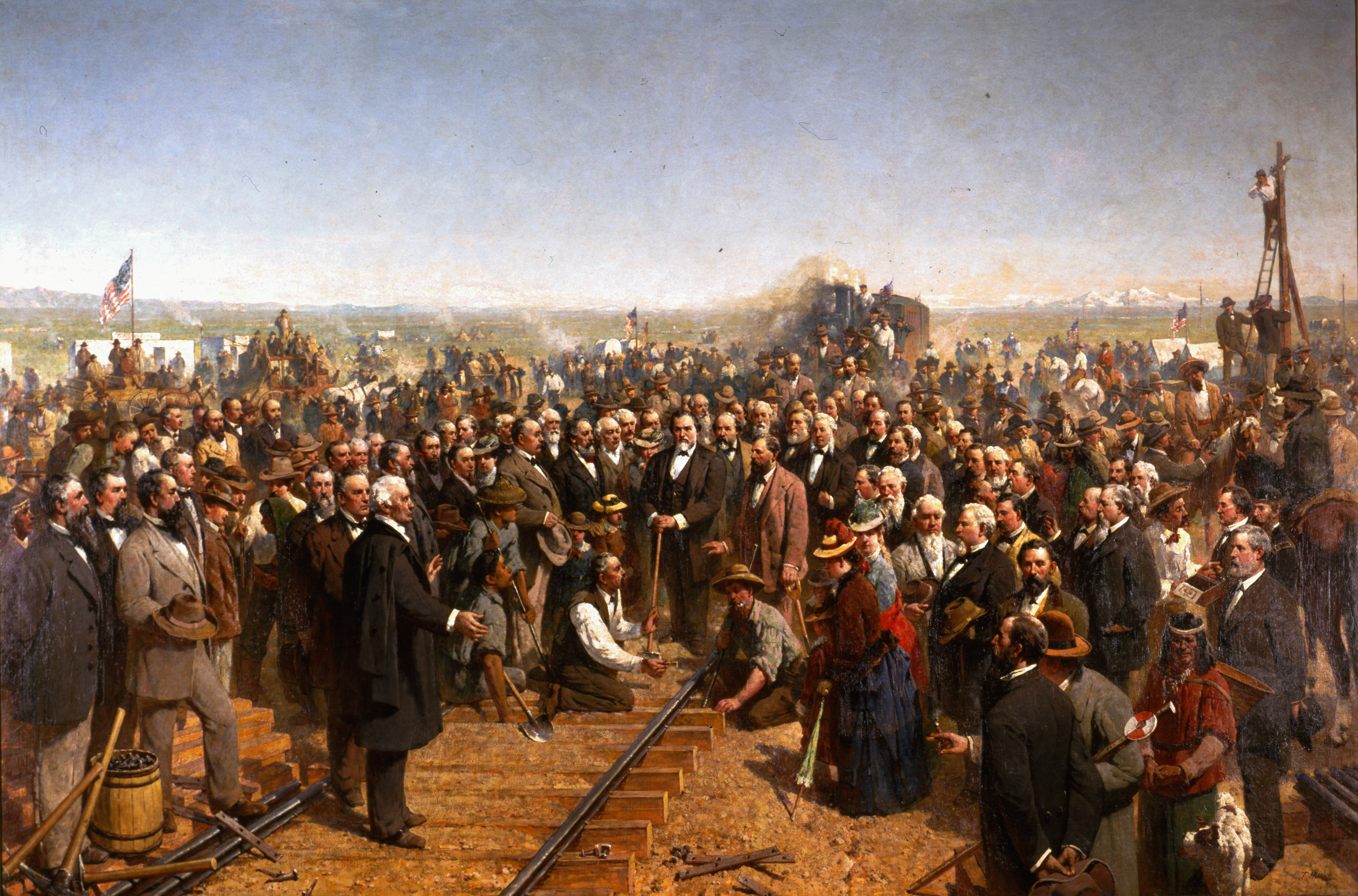
The Last Spike by Thomas Hill (1881)

The event at Promontory Summit was billed as the "wedding of the rails" and was officiated by the Reverend John Todd. Four precious-metal spikes were ceremoniously driven (i.e., gently tapped) with a special spike maul sporting a solid silver head into pre-drilled holes in the Laurelwood tie: The Golden Spike issued by Californian David Hewes, a second solid gold spike issued by the San Francisco Newsletter Newspaper, a solid silver spike issued by the State of Nevada, and an iron spike plated with silver on the shaft and gold on the top issued by Arizona Territory and presented by Arizona Territorial Governor Anson P.K. Safford from the Territorial Capital of Prescott.

Nobody tried to fully drive 17.6-Carat Solid Gold Spikes or any of the precious metal spikes into the tie. Four holes had been drilled into the Laurelwood tie to "hold" the spikes while Leland Stanford and UPRR's Thomas Durant gently tapped them. Then the Spikes and the Laurelwood Tie were removed to make way for a regular pine wood tie and four regular iron spikes; the last one was wired to the Transcontinental Telegraph Line. Stanford and Durant were supposed to strike the last iron spike with a regular iron spike hammer, also wired to the Telegraph Line, to send a signal from coast-to-coast that the job was done. Stanford missed the Spike, hitting the wooden tie instead; however, the telegraph operator hit his key as though Stanford had hit the spike. Durant missed the spike and the tie entirely; but likewise, the operator hit his key so the Nation would not know the difference. Then the operator sent the message D-O-N-E!

With the railroad's completion, a trip across the Nation went from up to six months on foot, on an animal, or in an animal-pulled wagon to as little as eight days from city of New York, via railroads and ferries, to San Francisco.

In 1898, the golden 'Hewes' spike was donated to the Leland Stanford Junior University Museum.The only marks on The Golden Spike had been caused by a Union Army Officer who struck the Spike with the pommel of his sword four times on the ride back to California.

Stanford University loaned the original 1869 gold spike to Cecil B. DeMille for the film Union Pacific (1939). It was held aloft in the scene commemorating the actual event, although a brass prop was used for the hammering sequence.

In one account, the second Golden Spike and the Laurelwood Tie were never located after the 1906 San Francisco earthquake and fire, which destroyed the San Francisco Newsletter Newspaper offices where these artifacts had been on display. In Union Pacific's account, the location of this "second, lower-quality golden spike ...faded into obscurity".

Promontory Summit marks the site where the First Transcontinental Railroad was completed May 10, 1869, from Omaha to Sacramento, but not "from the Missouri river to the Pacific" as called for by the Pacific Railroad Act of 1862. Western Pacific completed the final leg from Sacramento to San Francisco Bay on September 6, 1869, with the last spike at the Mossdale bridge spanning the San Joaquin River near Lathrop, California. Passengers had to cross the Missouri River by boat between Council Bluffs, Iowa, and Omaha, Nebraska, until the Union Pacific Missouri River Bridge was built in March 1872. In the meantime, the first uninterrupted coast-to-coast railroad was established in August 1870 at Strasburg, Colorado, with the completion of the Denver extension of the Kansas Pacific Railway.

== Later use ==
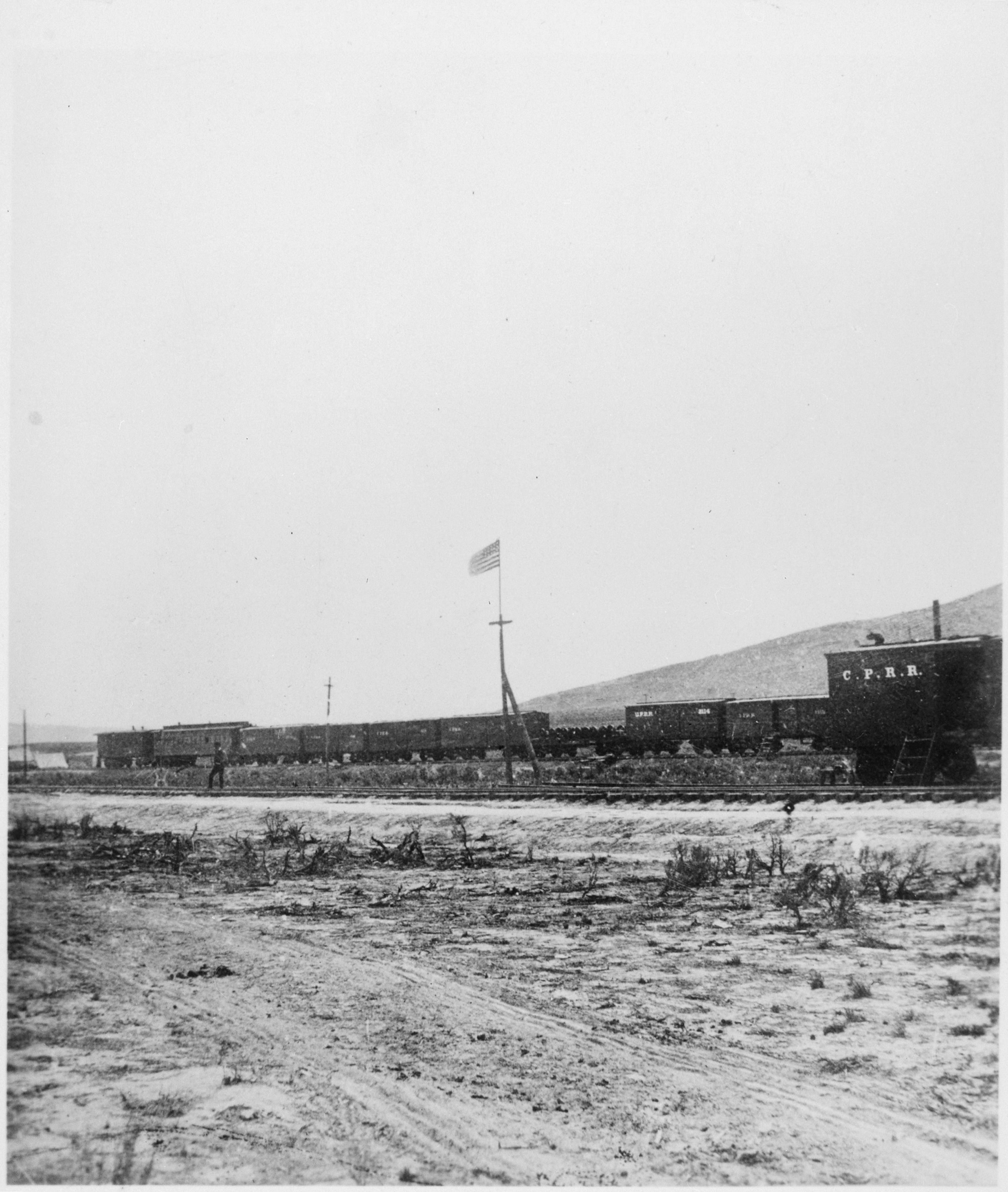
Promontory Summit in the 1870s

Promontory was the site of Promontory City during and shortly after the construction of the transcontinental railroad. However, by December 1869, the shops, tents, and store fronts were being dismantled as the traders and merchants moved to other towns. In January 1870, the train crews from the CP and UP had been relocated to Ogden, Utah, where Union Station had effectively become the meeting point of the two railroads. Promontory Station had a CP station agent and telegraph operator, a Chinese section gang, and gravel train crew. By June 1870, the population at Promontory Summit had been reduced to about 120 people. Most were employees of the CP railroad. The only exceptions were a hotel/eatery owner, his family, and 80 miners of copper sulfate.

Almost immediately CP began an extensive redevelopment of the rail infrastructure on and through Promontory Summit. The CP realigned about 10 miles of the original UP line east of Promontory Summit (on grade CP had surveyed) in 1870, replacing some of the UP’s steep grades and tight curves; in addition it got a roundhouse and turntable, a freight depot and locomotive yard. It also gained extensive support facilities for railroad workers, including an eating car, engine helper station, and quarters for the Chinese section crew.

In the final decades of the 19th century, Promontory Station was used by large ranching firms, such as those of John W. Kerr, John L. Edwards, and Charles Crocker, to ship their cattle to the stockyards in San Francisco and Chicago. At the turn of the 20th century, wheat farmers had begun to change the landscape around Promontory with farms and families. Promontory had a one-room school, as well as a commercial store/post office; it had become the main crossroads stop for small farms. However, during the droughts of the 1930s, individual farmers moved away from Promontory, leading to the consolidation of their lands into large holdings.

== Decline ==
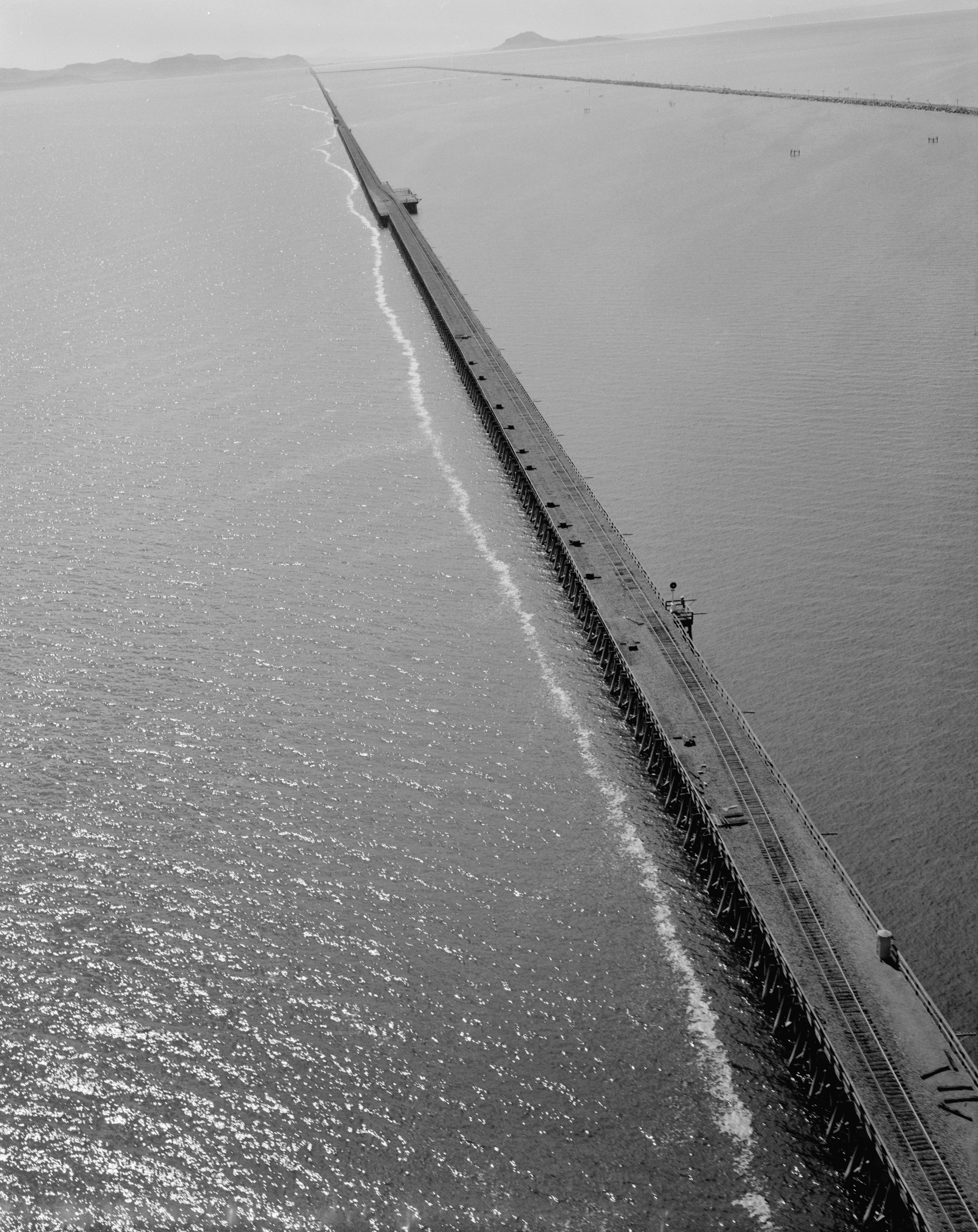
Aerial view of the trestle over the northern part of the Great Salt Lake west of Ogden in Box Elder County, Utah, with the replacement causeway on right (August 1971)

Although Union Pacific engineers had initially considered a direct route across the Great Salt Lake, cost and schedule constraints forced them to opt for the surveyed line through Promontory. As trains became longer and heavier, additional engines were often required to pull them along the winding curves and up steep grades to the Promontory summit.

This changed when the Southern Pacific, which had acquired Central Pacific operations in 1885, built a wooden railroad trestle across the Great Salt Lake between Ogden and Lucin, between February 1902 and March 1904. The 102.9 mi (165.6 km) Lucin Cutoff completely bypassed Promontory Summit. The last regularly scheduled transcontinental passenger train to pass through Promontory station was on Sunday, September 18, 1904. When the Great Depression led to a dramatic fall in revenues from railroad traffic, the Southern Pacific decided to abandon the line when it failed to meet its operating costs. On September 8, 1942, an "unspiking" ceremony was held to commemorate the lifting of the last rail over Promontory Summit; the old steel rails were used for the war effort in World War II.

In the 1950s, the wooden trestle was replaced with a parallel concrete-stone causeway built by the Morrison–Knudsen construction company. Southern Pacific continued to maintain the wooden trestle as a backup for several decades, although its last significant rail traffic was in the early 1960s.

By the 1980s, the trestle's condition had begun to seriously deteriorate. Beginning in March 1993, the timber from the trestle has been salvaged and removed.

== Preservation ==
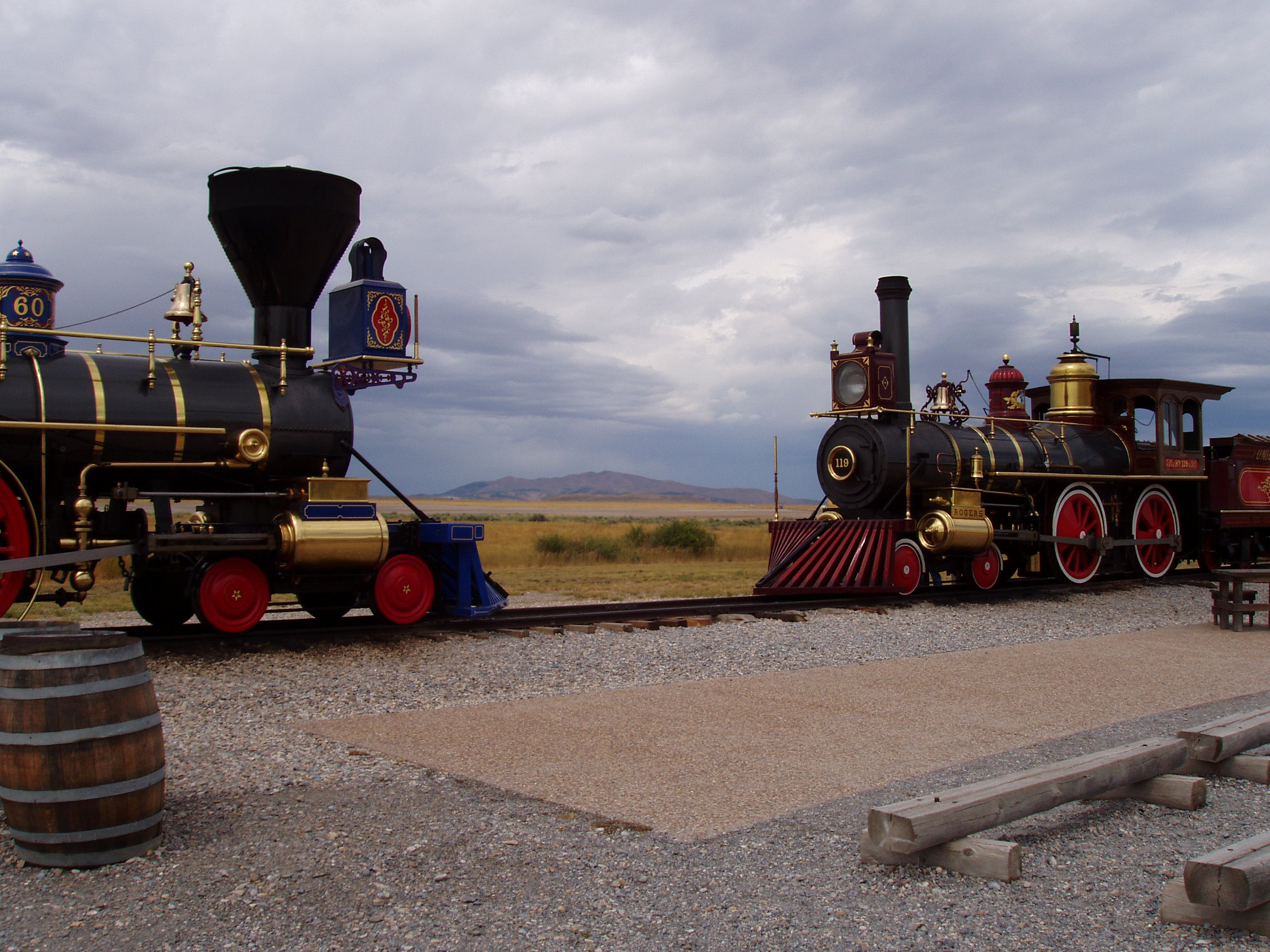
The Golden Spike National Historic Site, with replicas of the Central Pacific's Jupiter and the Union Pacific's No. 119 re-enacting the Golden Spike ceremony

By the early 1950s, a number of re-enactments of the driving of the last spike had been held at Promontory Summit. The renewed interest led to a concerted effort to save the historic site. In 1957, local campaigners succeeded in getting the area recognized by the federal government, but without federal land ownership. The Southern Pacific, which still owned the right of way, agreed to give its holdings to the federal management. On July 30, 1965 the Act for the Golden Spike National Historic Site was signed into law. The area is administered by the National Park Service.

On the 110th anniversary of the "Golden Spike" on May 10, 1979, two purpose-built replicas of the UP #119 and the Jupiter #60 were brought together on a specially relaid 1.5-mile section of track. As the original Jupiter had been scrapped for iron in 1901 and No. 119 had been broken up two years later, the two replica locomotives were built in California with $1.5 million of federal funds. They were reconstructed using scaled-up measurements taken from photographs of the original engines and reference to similar engines of the time.

The park, which has a visitor center and an engine house, is open throughout the year. Several walking trails and audio driving tours allow visitors to see the old cuts along the permanent way, highlighting the effort needed to construct the railroad over Promontory Summit. On every Saturday and holiday between May 1 and Labor Day, the two replica locomotives are lined up to re-enact the "Golden Spike" ceremony.

On the 150th anniversary of the completion of the railroad on May 10, 2019, the contributions of the 15,000 Chinese railroad workers were finally acknowledged. Records of the Chinese railroad workers had not been kept and it is believed thousands of people died laying those tracks due to the treacherous territory, including having to cut through the cold of the Sierra Nevada mountain range and the heat of the desert. Many descendants of the Chinese workers were at Promontory Summit for the occasion. A traditional Chinese lion dance opened the ceremony. The U.S. Secretary of Transportation, Elaine Chao (the first person of Chinese descent to hold the position), paid tribute to those Chinese workers.

== See also ==
- List of heritage railroads in the United States
