= Gunnison =

Gunnison may refer to:

- Foster Gunnison Jr. (1925–1994), American LGBT rights activist and independent archivist
- John W. Gunnison (1812–1853), American explorer whose name is used in several places in the Western states
- The Gunnison River in Colorado
  - Black Canyon of the Gunnison National Park
- Gunnison, Colorado
- Gunnison County, Colorado
- Gunnison, Mississippi
- Gunnison, Utah
- Gunnison Butte, Utah
- Gunnison Island, Great Salt Lake, Utah

== Other places ==
- Gunnison Beach, Sandy Hook, New Jersey

== Other uses ==
- Gunnison's prairie dog (Cynomys gunnisoni Baird 1855)
