= Edward Beckwith =

Edward Beckwith may refer to:

- Edward Griffin Beckwith (1818–1881), United States Army officer
- Edward Pierrepont Beckwith (1877–1966), American engineer and explorer
