= Franklin Lake =

Lake in Nevada, US

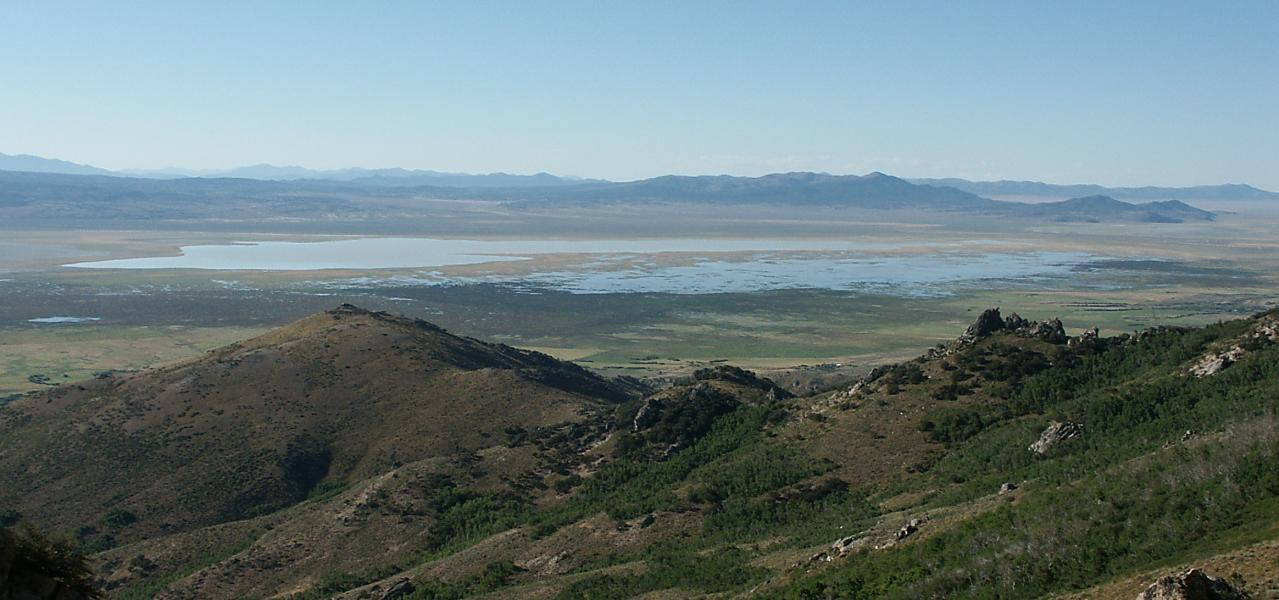
- Franklin Lake

- Location within Nevada Location within the United States
- Location: Elko County, Nevada
- Coordinates: 40°21′33″N 115°23′54″W
- Type: sink
- Basin countries: United States
- Surface elevation: 5,951 ft (1,814 m) (Lake)

Franklin Lake is a valley playa fed by the Franklin River in Elko County, Nevada, US. On the east side of the Ruby Mountains, it is 65 miles (105 km) southeast of the city of Elko, and is adjacent to the Ruby Lake National Wildlife Refuge. While mostly under private ownership, parts are owned by The Nature Conservancy and Bureau of Land Management; the Franklin Lake Wildlife Management Area is owned by the Nevada Department of Wildlife. The area's habitat, 15,400 acres (6,200 ha) in size, consists of wetlands, an ephemeral lake, marshes, riparian woodland, alkali playa, shrub steppe, and grassland.

== Flora and fauna ==
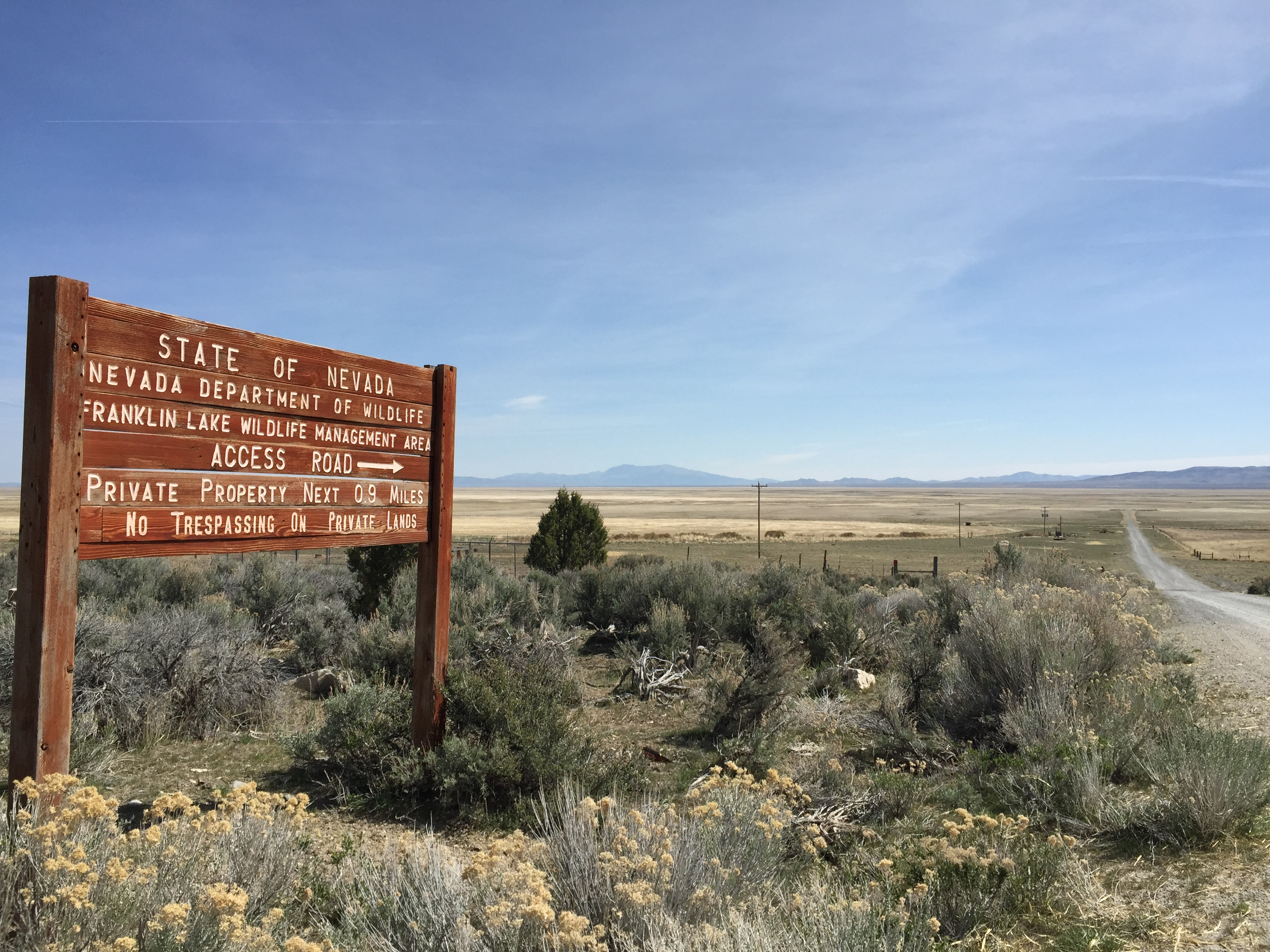
Entrance to the Franklin Lake Wildlife Management Area

Scirpus validus grows abundantly. When the area is wet, hundreds of thousands of waterfowl visit Franklin Lake. Avifauna include the American Avocet, Greater Sandhill Crane, Forster's Ter, Caspian Tern, Black Tern, Greater Sage-Grouse, Franklin's Gulls, American White Pelican, Brewer's Sparrow and Sage Sparrow. It was named in honor of President Franklin Pierce by Lieutenant E. G. Beckwith of the 1854 Beckwith Expedition.
