= Beckwith Expedition =

1854 railroad survey for Western Pacific

The 1854 Beckwith Expedition by Lieutenant Edward Griffin Beckwith surveyed an area that was subsequently used for the Western Pacific's 1910 Feather River Route (connecting Oakland, California and Salt Lake City, Utah).

== Context ==
Beckwith was the First Lieutenant of the 3rd U.S. Artillery. After the Mexican-American War, Beckwith was appointed to explore the new territory that was annexed to the United States. In 1853, during the Gunnison-Beckwith Expedition, Beckwith was assistant commander to John Williams Gunnison. The purpose of that expedition was to survey another railroad route in the Rocky Mountains. Gunnison was killed on October 26, 1853, near present-day Delta, Utah and Beckwith was placed in command. The group spent the winter at Salt Lake City.

== The Expedition ==
The 1854 Beckwith Expedition began in Salt Lake City on April 3, 1854, heading west towards Nevada. They group interacted with Latter Day Saints in the Salt Lake Valley to learn how to cultivate native plants. They faced challenges with snowy weather and were delayed several times.

The crew traveled using wagons and canoes. Beckwith extensively detailed the geological features of the landscape he encountered. Observations were made every 3 to 4 miles, depending on the difficulty of the terrain. They recorded their barometric observations to determine changes in elevation, and their astronomical observations to help them locate themselves. They also recorded the livestock and human populations they encountered on their expedition. The crew used latitude and longitude, as well as elevation to track their journey. Their goal was to illustrate the landscape to distinguish suitable passes for railroads. The group interacted with Indians in Tuilla Valley (now known as Tooele Valley) and established trade with them in exchange for help in navigating the land. The crew traveled using rivers, and replenished at established forts.

Beckwith disbanded his party after they reached the Sacramento River Valley, which was already known for its railroad suitability. By the end of their expedition the team had managed to cross the Sierra Nevada, Rocky, and Wasatch mountains. They plotted a rail-line that spanned an estimated 1,8899.71 miles. The line took a remarkably direct course from the Missouri West to the Pacific. It follows bodies of water for most of its length to allow for easy transport and the installation of an irrigation system.

== Importance ==
Beckwith was titled the “explorer of the Central Rockies” for his expedition. The line Beckwith surveyed was used to compete with the Central Pacific Railroad. His route connected California, Salt Lake City, and Oakland. Their findings were published by the United States Department of War and presented to the Senate to inform their decision for the location of the Transatlantic Railroad.

== See also ==
- Feather River Route
- John Williams Gunnison
- Central Pacific Railroad
