= David A. Hanson Collection of the History of Photomechanical Reproduction =

Collection of curated historic photos

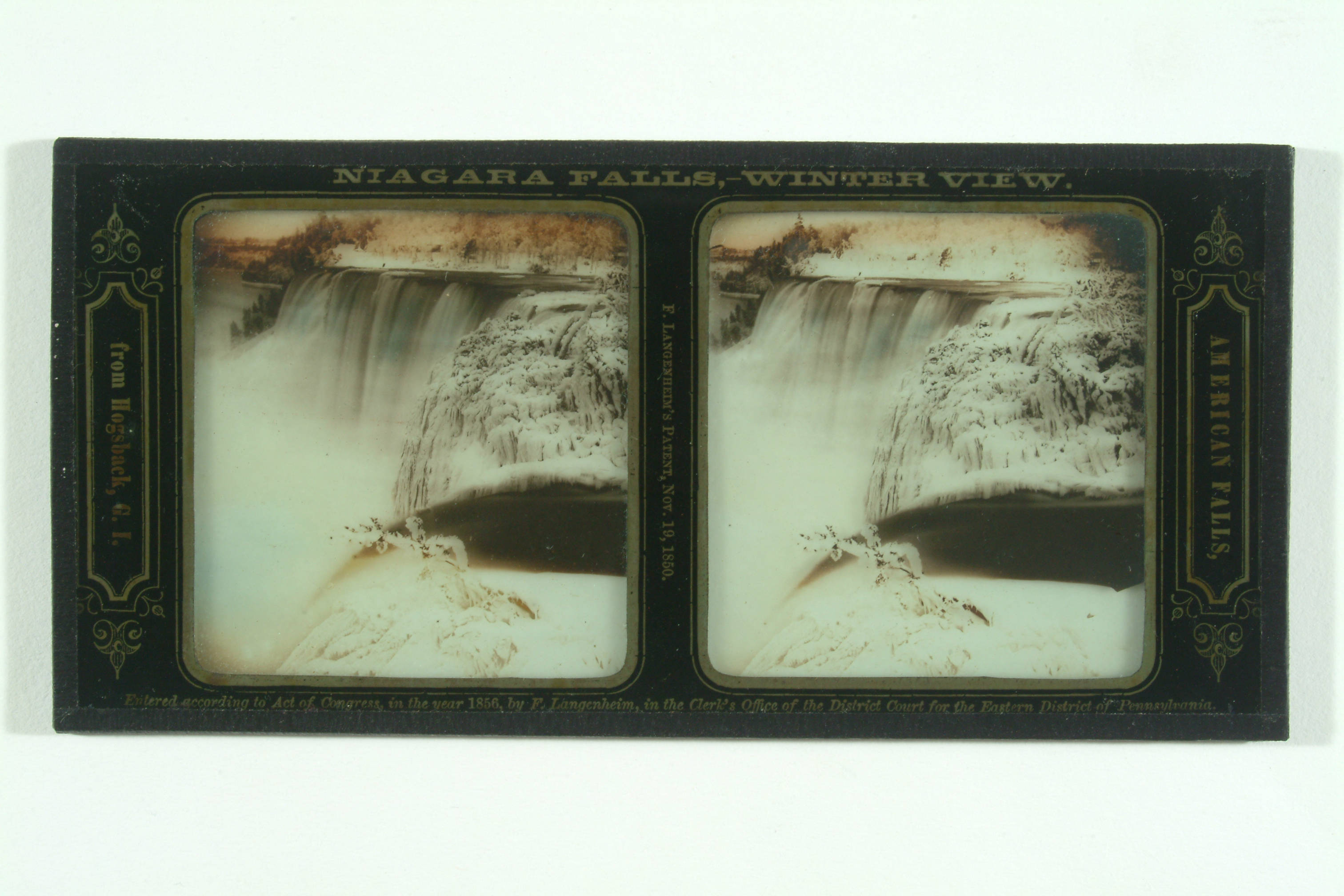
Hogsback, G.I. in the David A. Hanson Collection of the History of Photomechanical Reproduction. Sterling and Francine Clark Art Institute Library.

The David A. Hanson Collection of the History of Photomechanical Reproduction is a collection at the Clark Art Institute Library documenting the history of the development of photography from 1826 to the early 20th century. It includes all kinds of photography as well as books and articles. It was assembled by David A. Hanson.

== History ==
David A. Hanson is a photographer and art professor teaching at Fairleigh Dickinson University in New Jersey. He has been interested in the history of photography for many years, specifically about the technical side of it, and has written books and articles about it, such as The Beginnings of Photographic Reproduction in the USA. He also helped curate an exhibit called Photographs in Ink at Fairleigh Dickinson University's art gallery. The collection had been compiled by Hanson for over 25 years. Hanson sold the collection to The Clark in 2000 and was accessioned in 2001.

== Accessibility ==
All of the collection is open to users; however, to access some parts of the collection one needs to ask a librarian to get it (such as the rare books collection).

== About ==
The collection is multinational containing the work of Americans (Edward Bierstadt, John Carbutt), French (Nicephore Niepce) and Germans (Frederick Wilhelm von Egloffstein). The collection is about 75 linear feet. It has 1093 objects, including 599 books, 43 journals, and 444 of various types of photographs such as collotypes, halftones, photolithographs, and woodburytypes. It also has coffee cards. The digital collection about 4500 images from the collection. A full list of the catalog can be found online.

== Gallery ==
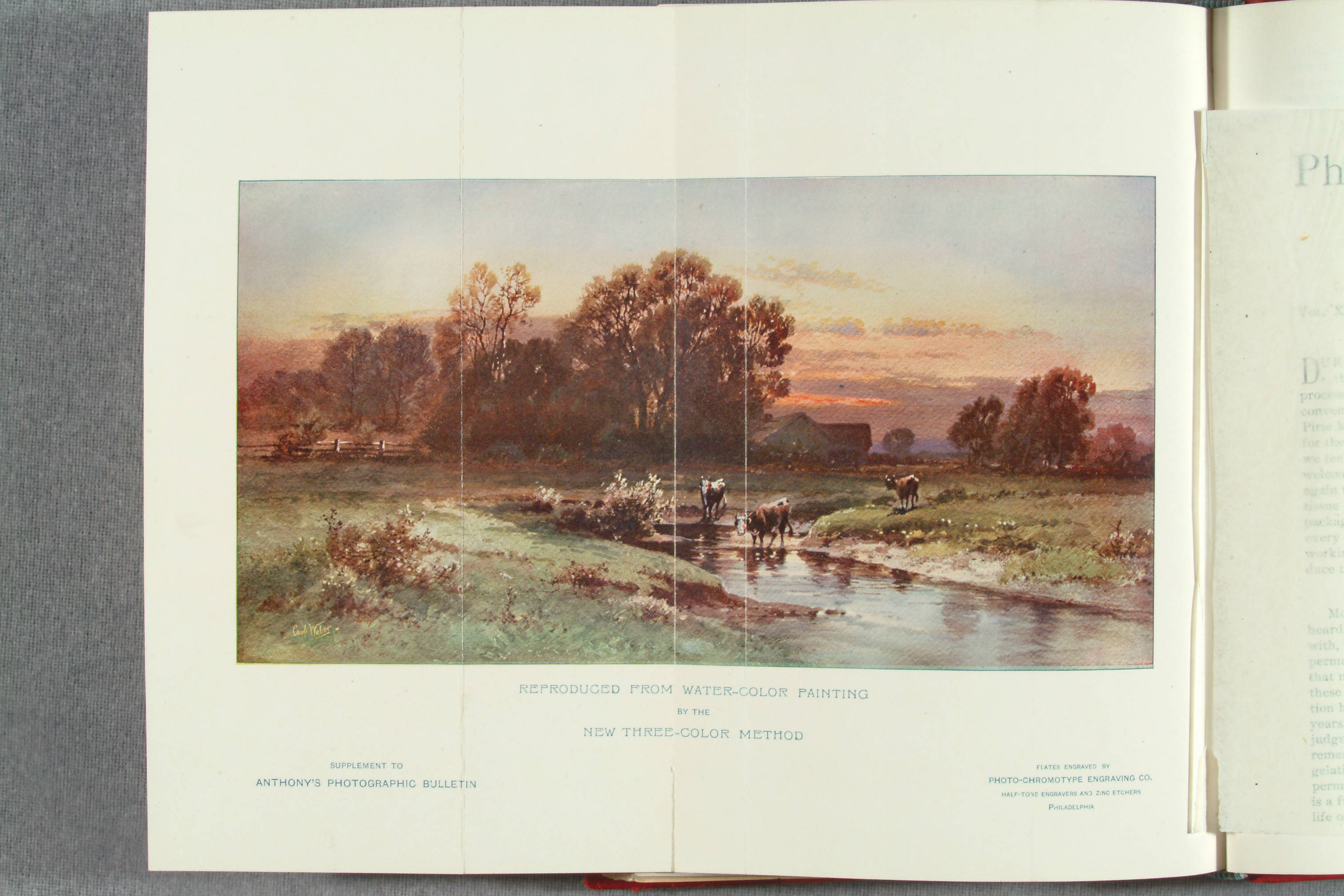
Haltone print from Anthony's photographic bulletin v. 26 1895

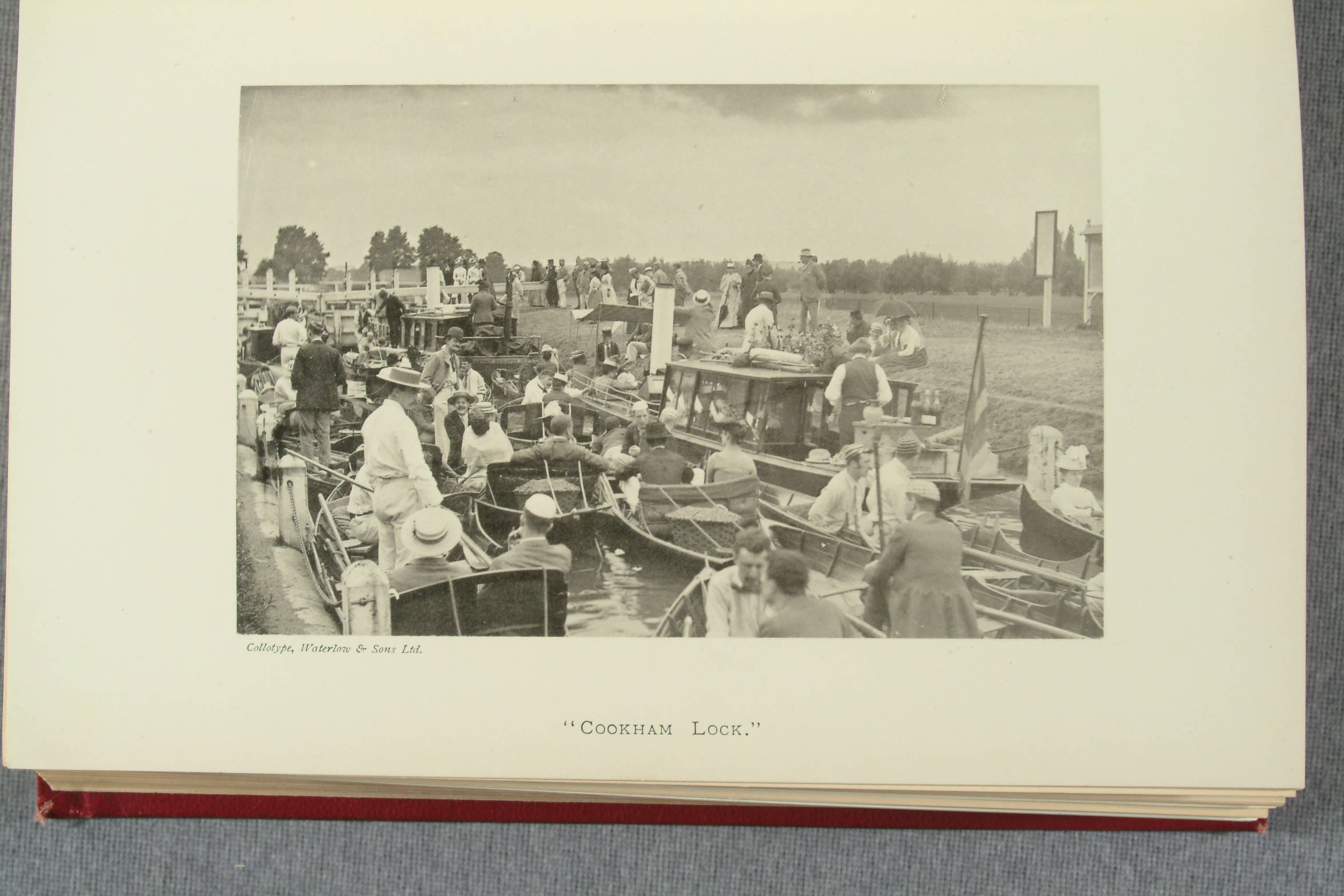
Photographic print from Photomechanical plates in Photography: its history, processes, apparatus, and materials

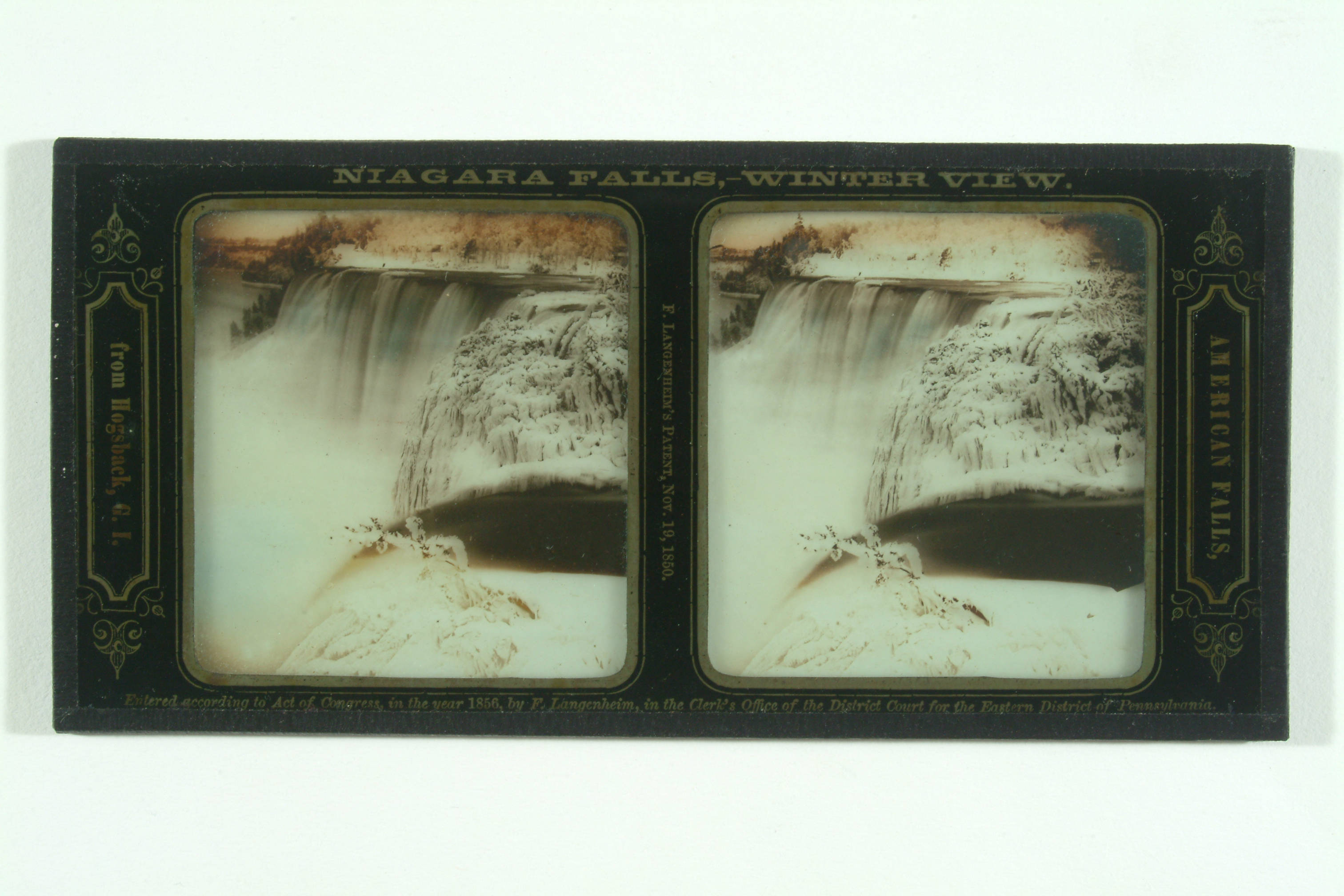
Hogsback, G.I.

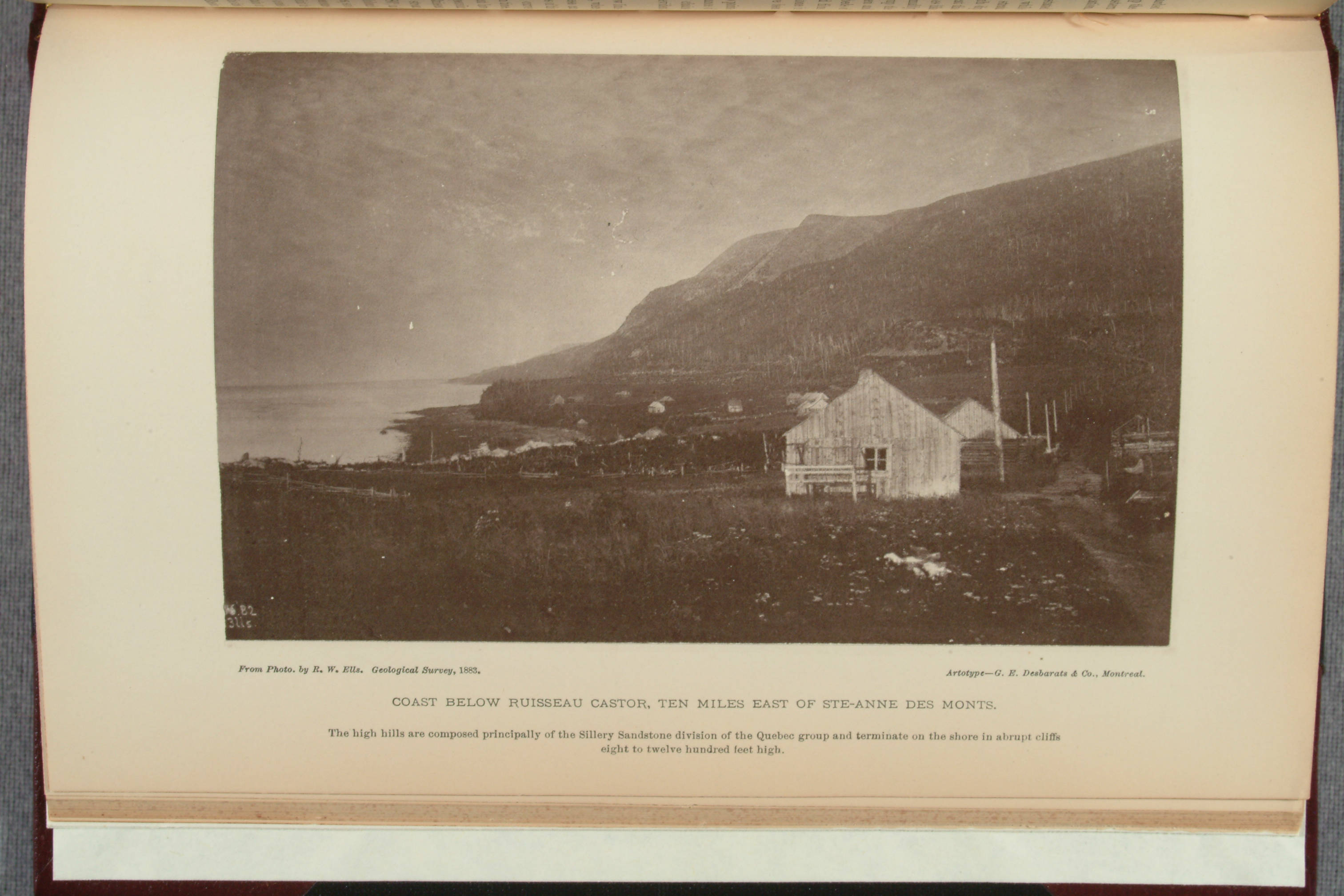
Artotypeillustrations of Canadian scenery in Report of Progress for 1880-81-82

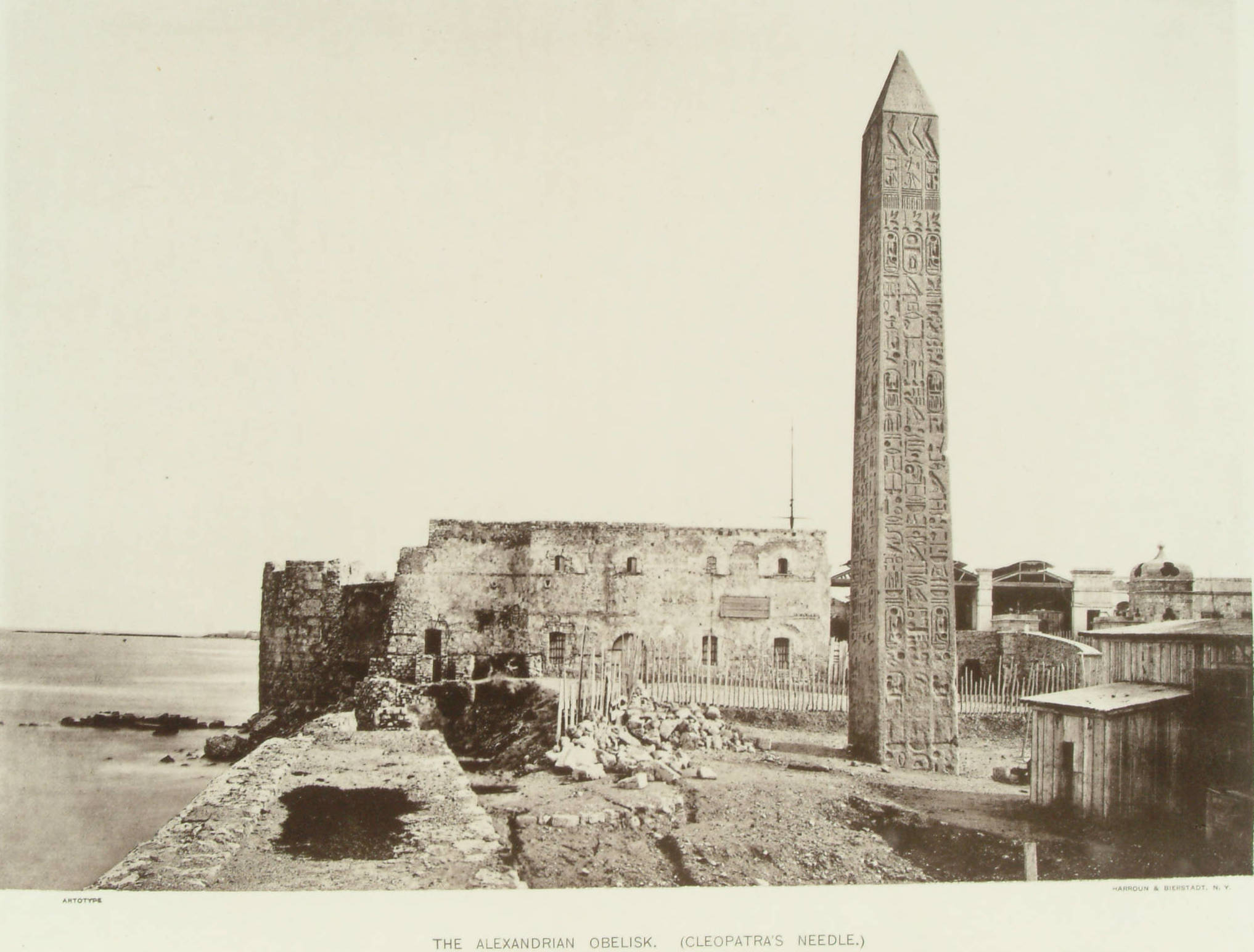
Artotypes of the removal, transport and erection of Cleopatra's Needle from Egypt to the Metropolitan Museum in New York in Egyptian obelisks

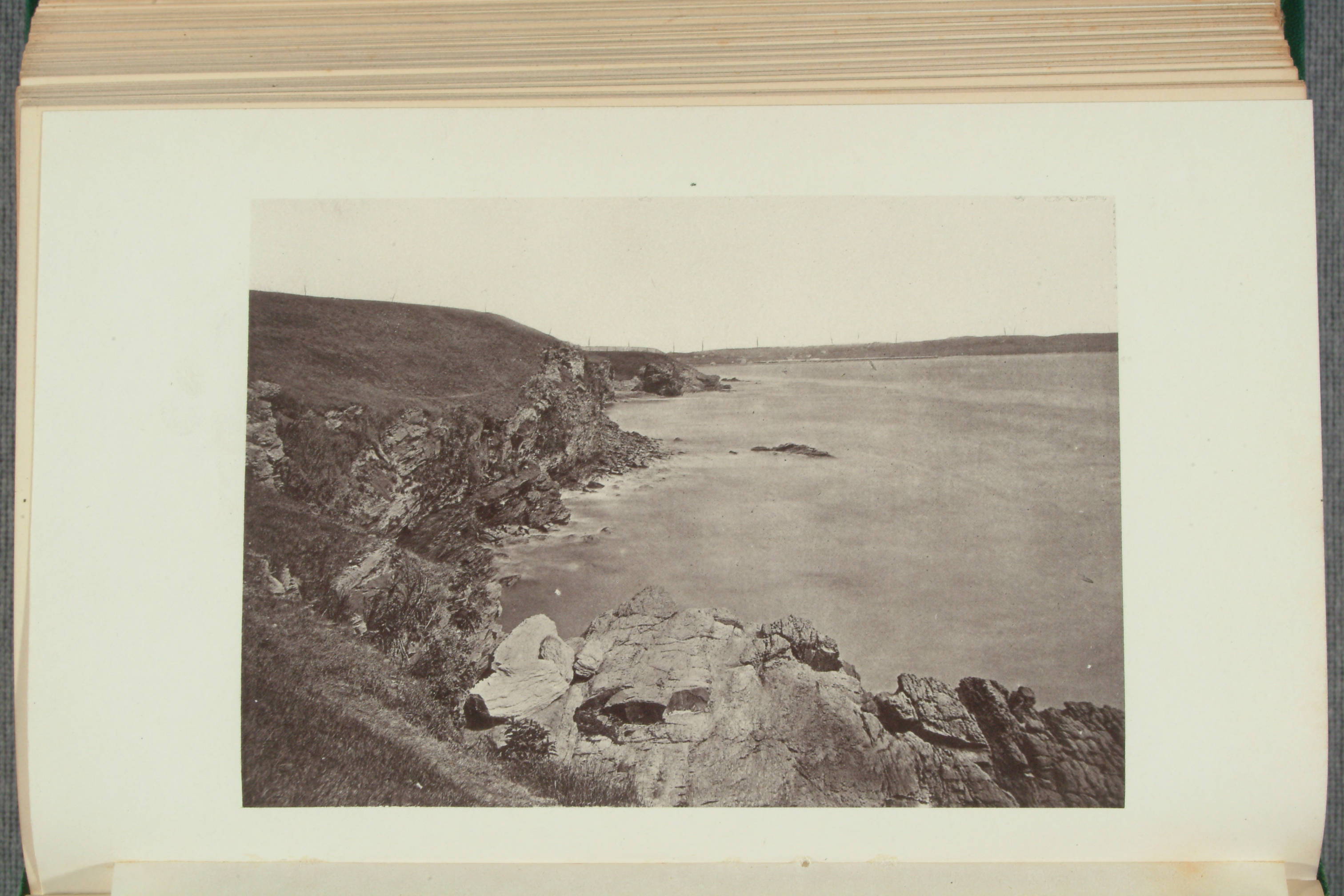
Heliotype illustrations from photographs around Newport, Rhode Island in Oldport days

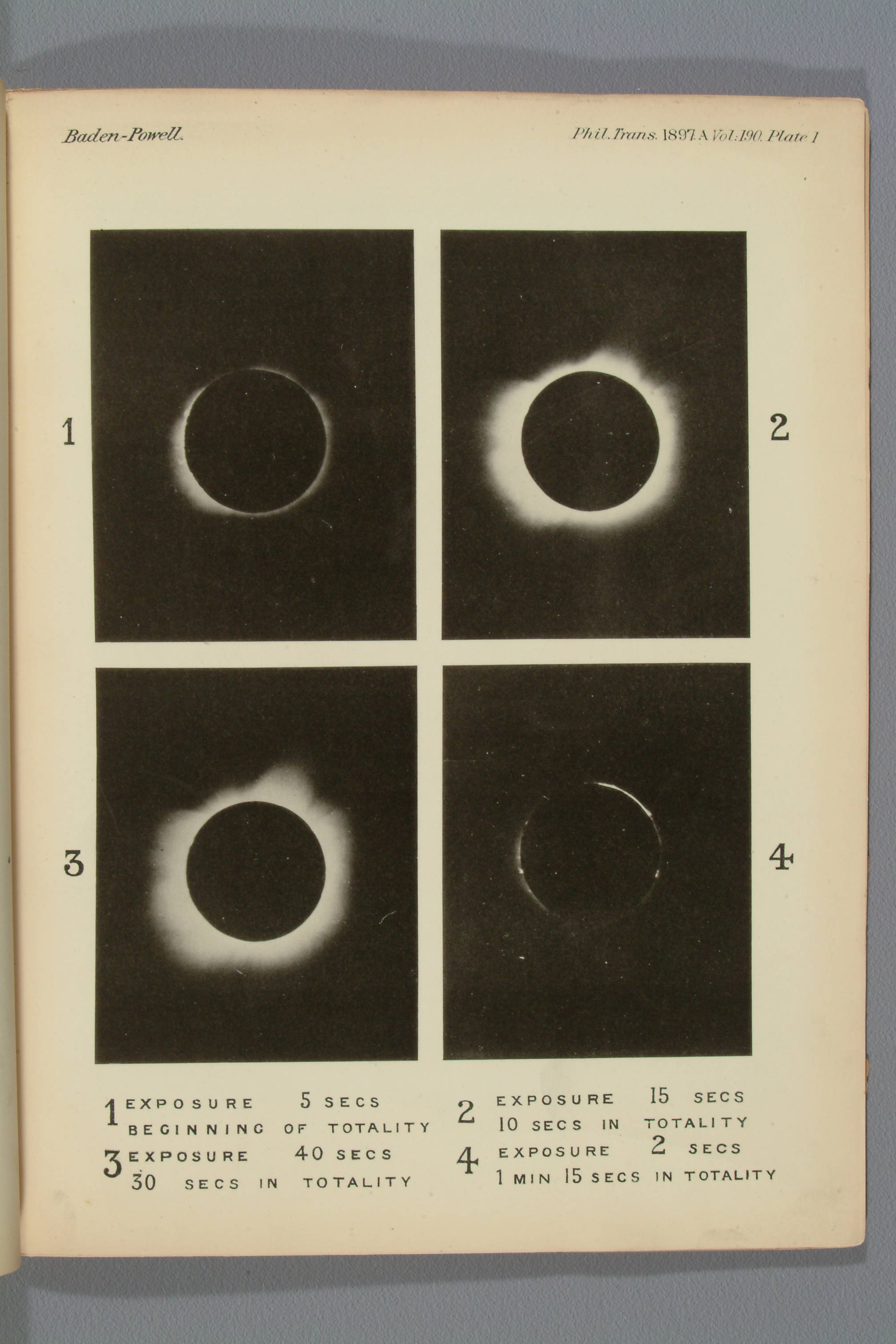
Collotypes and woodburytype in Total eclipse of the sun, 1896

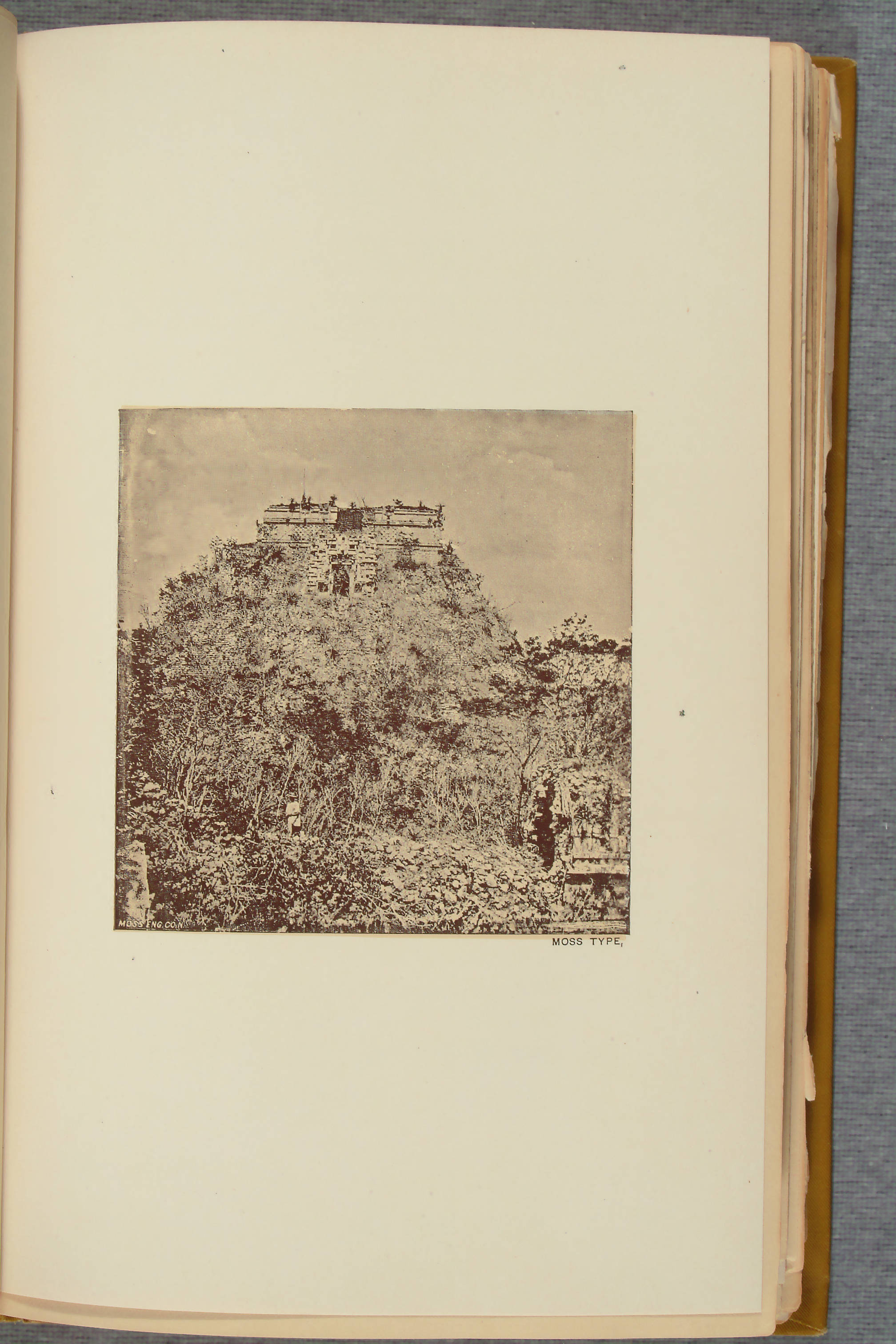
Halftone plates in Sacred mysteries among the Mayas and the Quiches, 11,500 years ago
