= Frederick W. von Egloffstein =

Frederick Wilhelm von Egloffstein
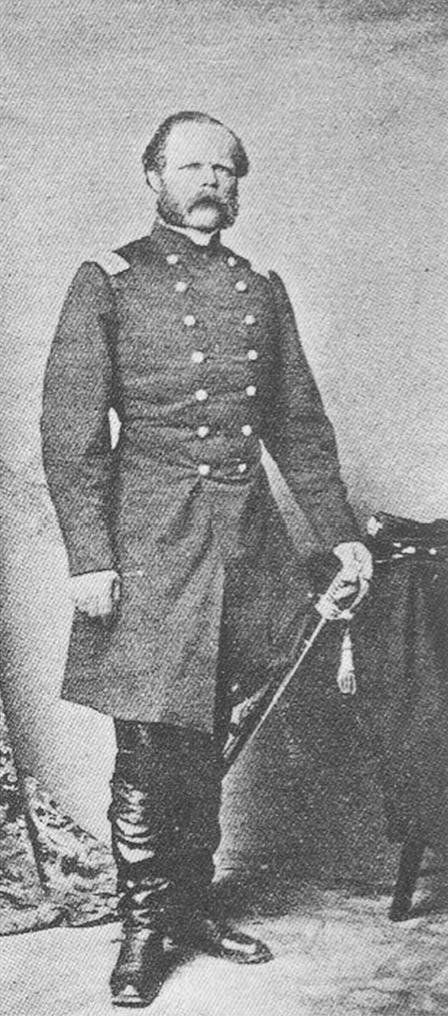
- Baron Friedrich Wilhelm von Egloffstein as colonel of the 103rd New York Volunteer Infantry, 1861-1862
- Born: May 18, 1824; Egloffstein, Kingdom of Bavaria
- Died: February 18, 1885 (aged 60); Dresden, Kingdom of Saxony

Frederick Wilhelm von Egloffstein (18 May 1824 – 18 February 1885) was a German-born military man, explorer, mapmaker, landscape artist and engraver. He was the first person to employ ruled glass screens, together with photography, to produce engravings.

== Biography ==
=== Early life and family ===
Born Friedrich Ernst Sigmund Kamill von Egloffstein at Egloffstein, the fifth and last son of Baron Wilhelm von Egloffstein and his second wife Karoline Marquise de Montperny. The Egloffsteins have their ancestral castle after which they are named, overlooking the village of the same name. They are regarded as Imperial barons of Franconia, and they were Protestants. Baron Wilhelm von Egloffstein had served in the Prussian army as well as in the court of the prince of Baden at Karlsruhe before taking service as a Bavarian forestry officer in 1811 where he served as Master of the Royal Bavarian Forests.

Baron F. W. von Egloffstein was serving in the Prussian army as a lieutenant in the 5th (von Neumann or First Silesian) Battalion of Rangers (Jäger) in Görlitz, Prussian Silesia, in 1846 when he left for the United States. He would resign his commission in 1847 but briefly return to Germany in December 1848 to marry Irmgard von Kiesenwetter in Reichenbach, Oberlausitz, then Prussian Silesia, today Saxony. His wife came from a prominent family of the Kingdom of Saxony. He had a daughter in St. Louis, Missouri who died early; his eldest son Friedrich, born in Dresden on 6 June 1855, would marry in Iowa; a second son, Philip was born in 1867 and baptized in New York. A daughter, Magdalena Elisabeth, was born in New York on 15 October 1871 and baptized on 15 June 1873.

=== In America ===
On August 31, 1846, F. W. von Egloffstein arrived in Baltimore, accompanied by his future brother-in-law Ernst von Kiesenwetter, with a stated intention of going to Texas. He is recorded between December 1846 and April 1847 in New Orleans as a partner of C. A. Hedin from Sweden, and from May 1848 in St. Louis, Missouri. In New Orleans he produced several posters of houses for sale, preserved in the Orleans Parish Archive. By 1852 he was surveying properties and publishing maps as a partner of one G. Zwanziger, including a map of Bellefontaine Cemetery and another of western St. Louis County as a promotion for the Pacific Railroad. He cultivated the friendship of the pioneer botanist Dr. George Engelmann in St. Louis, and a correspondence in German survives in the archives of the Missouri Botanical Garden.

In 1850 his cousin, the future novelist and naturalist Baron Ludwig von Reizenstein, visited him in St. Louis and was taught the skills of surveying by von Egloffstein.

Von Egloffstein was hired as a topographer for the last Western expedition of John Charles Frémont, 1853-54. He left the expedition in Parowan, Utah, after near starvation and exposure in the mountains and went to Great Salt Lake City with his friend and colleague, the Daguerreotypist Solomon Nunes Carvalho. In Great Salt Lake City, he joined the survivors of the Gunnison–Beckwith Expedition under Lieutenant Edward G. Beckwith, producing maps and panoramas of Utah, Wyoming, Nevada and California, published in the Pacific Railroad Reports.

After the completion of the Beckwith expedition, von Egloffstein moved to Washington, DC, where he helped edit volumes of the Pacific Railroad Reports. He began experimenting with new ways to portray terrain by taking photographs of plaster models.

=== Grand Canyon expedition ===
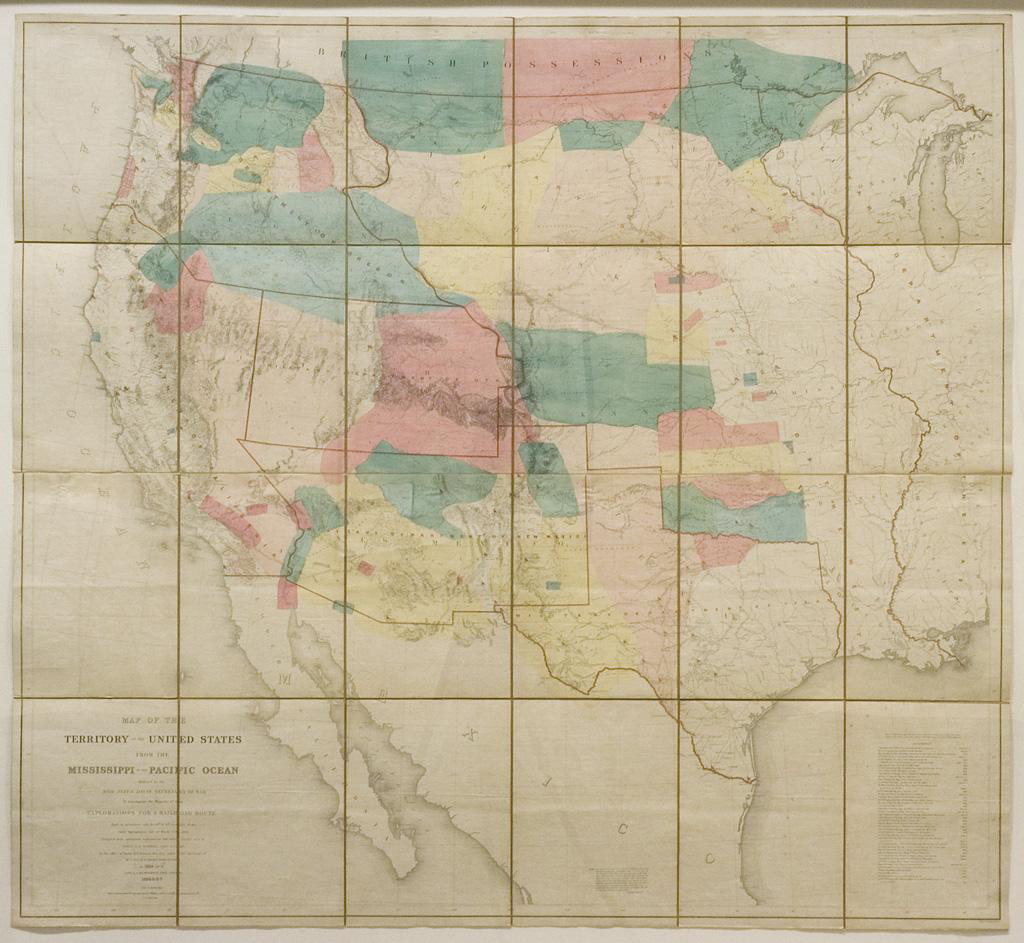
Warren, Freyhold, and von Egloffstein, Map of the Territory of the United States from the Mississippi to the Pacific Ocean, 1857

In 1857-58 von Egloffstein was one of two artists, along with Balduin Möllhausen, on the Joseph Christmas Ives expedition up the Colorado. The official report of the 1857-8 expedition to the Grand Canyon was titled "Report Upon the Colorado River of the West", published by Congress in 1861. Since by that time the US was deeply embroiled in a great civil war, the report received little attention. It was not until the 1880s, when public knowledge of the magnificent Grand Canyon had grown appreciably, that the report received greater recognition. It contained the first written descriptions of the Canyon's inner areas, as well as maps, panoramas, and illustrative plates by von Egloffstein, the expedition artist. His maps are now regarded as among the finest produced in the nineteenth century, using a half-tone system of his own invention.

Ives' report contains three engravings and three panoramic line drawings describing the "Big Caňon" of the Colorado. One particular stunning depiction was titled "Black Caňon" by von Egloffstein himself, and has generally been understood to depict the section of the Colorado River where Hoover Dam now stands. These drawings have been criticized for over a hundred years by those who have subsequently visited the Canyon, since his depictions in no way resemble the actual terrain.

Students of von Egloffstein's work have been baffled by the apparent errors, since von Egloffstein was superbly competent - the 1861 report also contains a meticulous and accurate relief map of the Grand Canyon which von Egloffstein produced on the trip. It was not until 2001 that an explanation for the discrepancies began to be developed: Jeremy Miller, viewing von Egloffstein's Black Cañon in a New York exhibition, recognized it not as a portion of the Grand Canyon, but as part of the Gunnison River in present-day Colorado. He found the topographical map of that area which von Egloffstein had produced for the Gunnison expedition, and noted that what is now called the Gunnison River was marked "Grand River" thereon. He found another von Egloffstein work, View Showing the Formation of the Cañon of the Grand River, which had been produced during the Gunnison expedition. He then traveled to the Gunnison River and located sites which duplicated the vistas shown in the von Egloffstein engravings of the nineteenth century. It is now presumed that Congressional staffers working on the 1861 Grand Canyon report misfiled the von Egloffstein works, assuming that his "Grand Caňon" engravings must refer to The Grand Canyon expedition.

=== Civil War ===
In 1861 von Egloffstein, who had moved to New York City, helped organize what became the 103rd New York Volunteer Infantry, of which he was elected colonel. His American military career was quickly ended by his serious wounding in late April 1862, in North Carolina, although he did not resign his commission until late 1863. He was granted a brevet commission as a brigadier general in 1865.

During the Civil War he produced a large map in his contoured style showing the Four Corners region for a report that was only published decades later. It shows paths of all major explorations in the region up to that time.

In 1864 he would publish a study of the mineral resources of the state of México based on reports done in the 1820s by his long-term friend Baron Friedrich von Gerolt, Prussian Minister to the United States. His maps for this book are regarded as outstanding examples of half-tone and color map-making and display.

Von Egloffstein also patented a method for photographically creating half-tone printing plates, which he sought to exploit commercially in the 1860s and 1870s, but with little commercial success. He continued working as an engraver and maker of scale models until his departure from America in 1878.

=== Return to Germany and death ===
He would return to Germany in 1878, living in a house in Hosterwitz near Dresden, Kingdom of Saxony. After his death in 1885 an autopsy was performed to document his widow's claim that he died as a result of infection from his war wound. This claim was accepted by the United States Commissioner of Pensions. Reports of various dates of his death are the result of ignorance on the part of his American descendants.
