= 103rd New York Infantry Regiment =

- Active: October 1861 to December 7, 1865
- Country: United States
- Allegiance: Union
- Branch: Infantry
- Engagements: Battle of Haughton's Mill; Battle of South Mountain; Battle of Antietam; Battle of Fredericksburg; Battle of Providence Church Road; Siege of Suffolk; Battle of Cedar Creek; Siege of Petersburg; Third Battle of Petersburg

The 103rd New York Infantry Regiment ("Seward Infantry") was an infantry regiment in the Union Army during the American Civil War.

== Service ==
The 103rd New York Infantry was organized at New York City, New York beginning in October 1861 and mustered in for a three-year enlistment under the command of Colonel Frederick W. von Egloffstein.

The regiment was attached to Norfolk, Virginia, Department of Virginia, to April 1862. 1st Brigade, 2nd Division, Department of North Carolina, to July 1862. 1st Brigade, 3rd Division, IX Corps, Army of the Potomac, to April 1863. 1st Brigade, 2nd Division, VII Corps, Department of Virginia, to July 1863. Alvord's Brigade, Vodges' Division, Folly Island, South Carolina, X Corps, Department of the South, to February 1864. 2nd Brigade, Gordon's Division, Folly Island, South Carolina, Northern District, to April 1864. Folly Island, South Carolina, Northern District, Department of the South, to August 1864. 3rd Brigade, DeRussy's Division, XXII Corps, Department of Washington, to September 1864. 1st Brigade, Kitching's Division (Provisional), Army of the Shenandoah, to December 1864. 1st Brigade, Provisional Division, Department of Virginia and North Carolina, to March 1865. 1st Brigade, Infantry Division, Defenses of Bermuda Hundred, Virginia, to May 1865. Department of Virginia to December 1865.

The 103rd New York Infantry mustered out of service on December 7, 1865.

== Detailed service ==
Left New York for Washington, D.C., March 5, 1862, then moved to Norfolk, Va., March 21, and to New Bern, N.C., April. Duty in the defenses of Washington, D.C., until March 21, 1862, and at Norfolk, Va., until April 1862. Ordered to New Bern, N.C., and duty there until July. Action at Gillett's Farm, Pebbly Run, April 13. Haughton's Mills April 27. Moved to Newport News, Va., July 2–6, then to Aquia Creek and Fredericksburg, Va., August 2–6. Duty there until August 31. Moved to Washington, D.C., August 31-September 3. Maryland Campaign September 6–22. Battle of South Mountain September 14. Battle of Antietam September 16–17. Duty at Pleasant Valley, Md., until October 27. Movement to Falmouth, Va., October 27-November 19. Battle of Fredericksburg, Va., December 12–15. "Mud March" January 20–24, 1863. Moved to Newport News, Va., February 6–9, then to Suffolk March 13, and duty there until June. Siege of Suffolk April 12-May 4. Edenton Road April 24. Suffolk May 2–4. Providence Church Road May 3. Dix's Peninsula Campaign June 24-July 7. Expedition from White House to South Anna River July 1–7. Ordered to Folly Island, S.C., July 28. Siege operations against Forts Wagner and Gregg on Morris Island and against Fort Sumter and Charleston, S.C., August 14-September 7. Bombardment of Fort Sumter August 17–23. Capture of Forts Wagner and Gregg September 7. Operations against Charleston and duty on Folly Island, S.C., September 1863 to August 1864. Demonstrations on James Island May 21–22 and July 1–10, 1864. Ordered to Washington, D.C., August 1864, and duty there until September 27. Ordered to the Shenandoah Valley, Va., September 27, and duty there until November 22. Battle of Cedar Creek October 19. Ordered to Bermuda Hundred, Va., November 22, and duty in the defenses at that point to March 1865. Siege operations against Petersburg and Richmond December 1864 to April 1865. Fall of Petersburg and Richmond April 2–3. Duty in the Department of Virginia until December 1865.

== Casualties ==
The regiment lost a total of 168 men during service; 5 officers and 61 enlisted men killed or mortally wounded, 2 officers and 100 enlisted men died of disease.

== Commanders ==
- Colonel Frederick W. von Egloffstein - wounded in action at the Battle of Houghton's Mill; discharged November 1, 1863 due to his wounds
- Colonel Benjamin Ringold - mortally wounded in action at the Battle of Providence Church Road
- Colonel Wilhelm Heine

== See also ==
- List of New York Civil War regiments
- New York in the Civil War
