= Gunnison Butte =

Mountain in Utah, United States

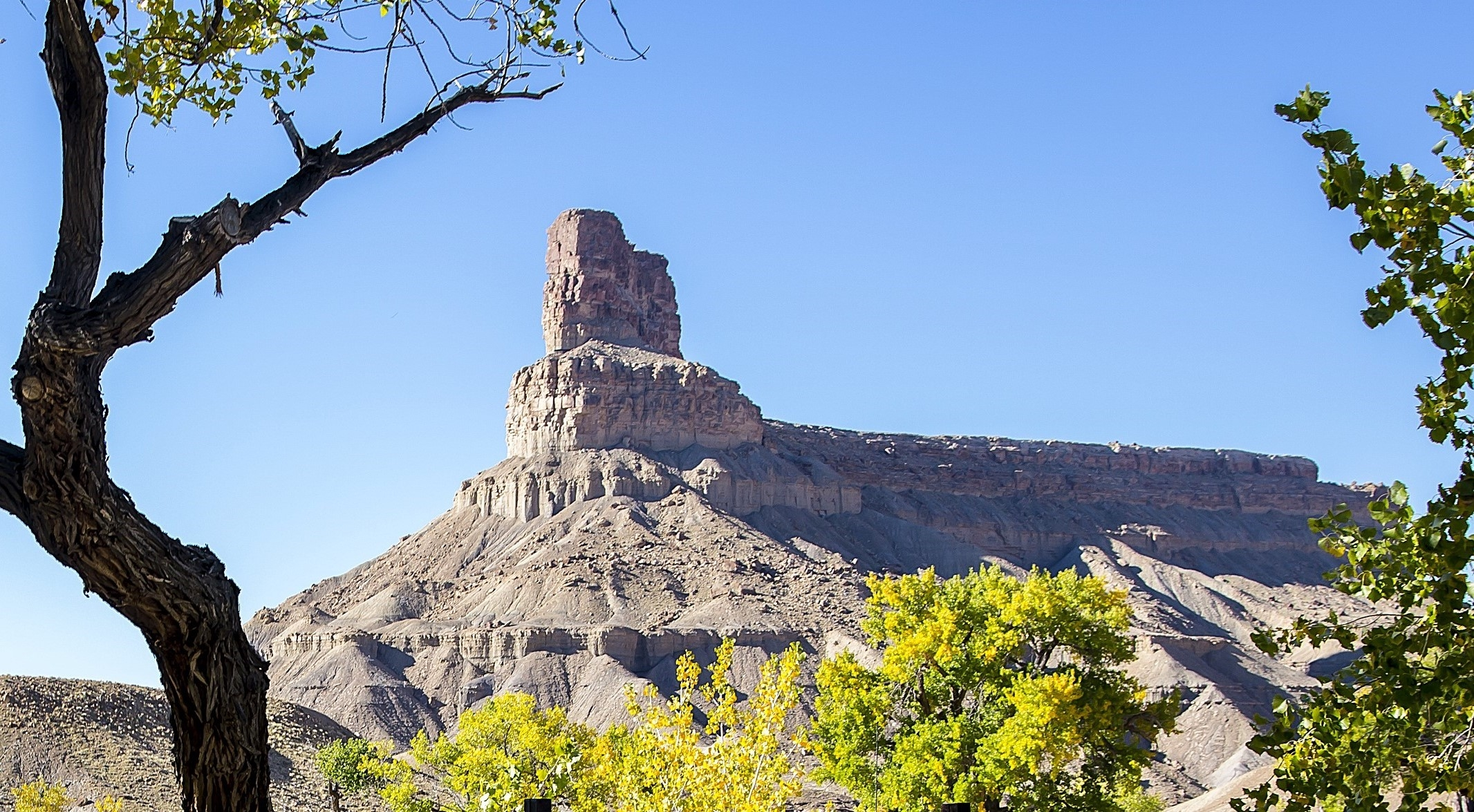
- Northeast aspect

Highest point
- Elevation: 5,247 ft (1,599 m)
- Prominence: 705 ft (215 m)
- Parent peak: Peak 5452
- Isolation: 1.08 mi (1.74 km)
- Coordinates: 39°06′22″N 110°07′28″W

Naming
- Etymology: John Williams Gunnison

Geography
- Location within Utah Location within the United States
- Country: United States
- State: Utah
- County: Emery
- Protected area: Desolation Canyon Wilderness
- Parent range: Colorado Plateau
- Topo map: USGS Tusher Canyon

Geology
- Rock age: Late Cretaceous
- Rock type: Sedimentary rock

Climbing
- Easiest route: class 5.6

Gunnison Butte is a 5,247-foot (1,599 m) summit in Emery County, Utah, United States.

== Description ==
Gunnison Butte is situated eight miles (13 km) north of the town of Green River at the southeastern end of the Beckwith Plateau and along the boundary of the Desolation Canyon Wilderness Study Area which is the largest Wilderness study area managed by the Bureau of Land Management in the contiguous 48 states. The toponym honors John Williams Gunnison (1812–1853), an American military officer who explored Utah with Edward Griffin Beckwith and crossed the Green River on September 30, 1853. The toponym has been officially adopted by the U.S. Board on Geographic Names. Precipitation runoff from this landform drains into the Green River which flows east of the butte. Topographic relief is significant as the summit rises 1,100 feet (335 meters) above the Green River in 0.4 mile (0.64 km). This butte is composed of sandstone of the Mesaverde Group which was deposited in the Late Cretaceous.

== Climate ==
According to the Köppen climate classification system, Gunnison Butte is located in a Cold semi-arid climate zone, which is defined by the coldest month having an average mean temperature below 32 °F (0 °C), and at least 50% of the total annual precipitation being received during the spring and summer. This desert climate receives less than 10 inches (250 millimeters) of annual rainfall, and snowfall is generally light during the winter. Spring and fall are the most favorable seasons to visit Gunnison Butte.

== Gallery ==
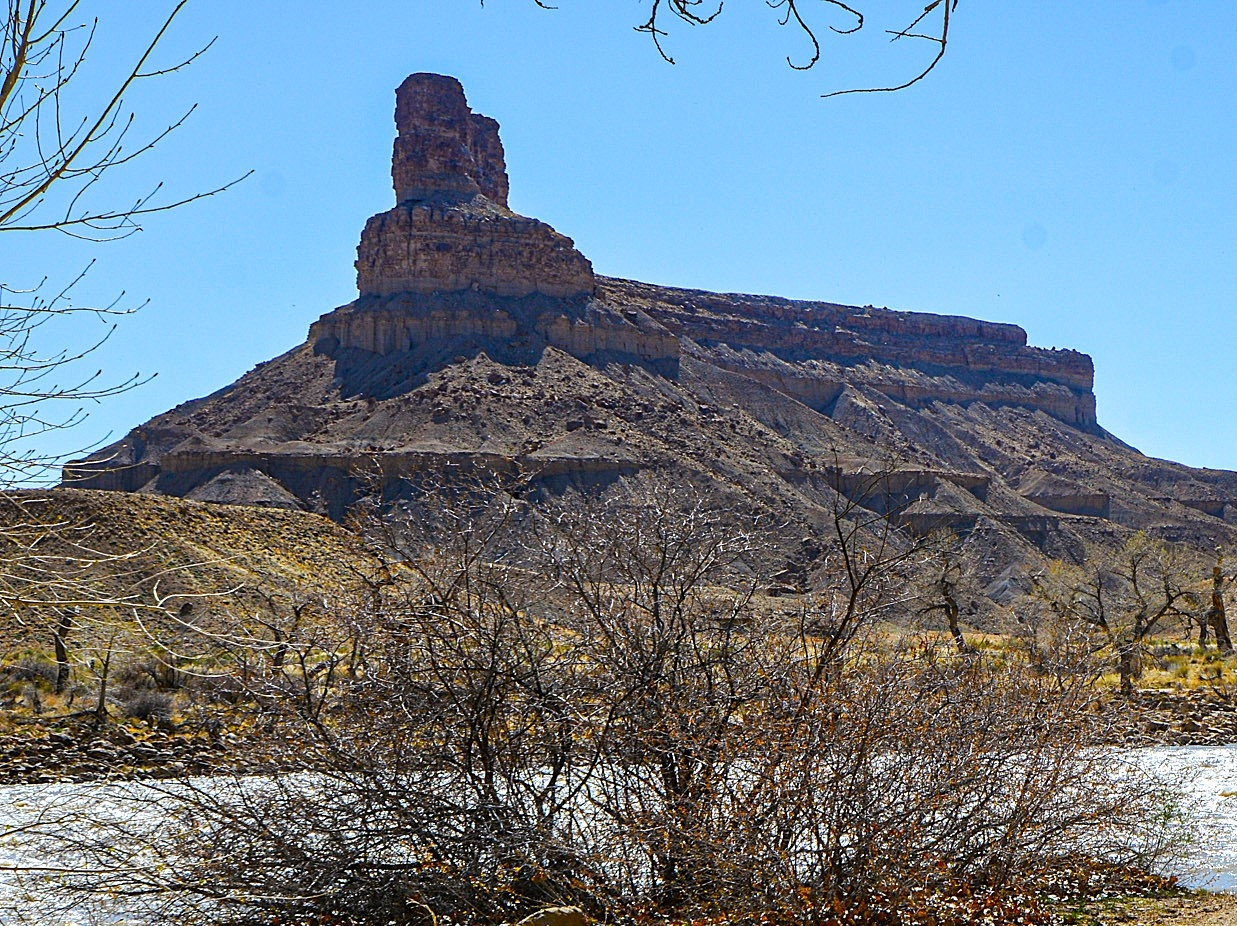

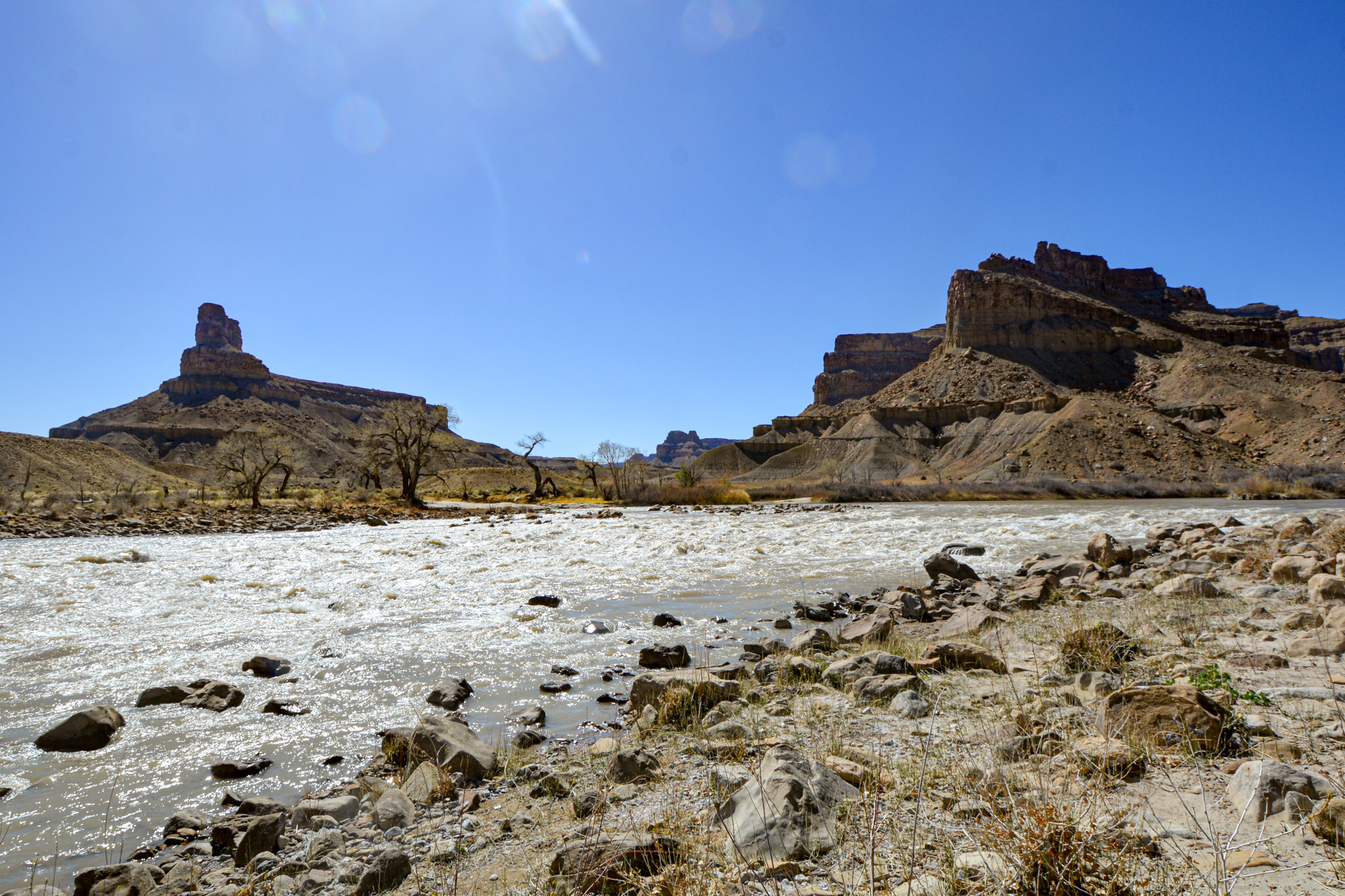
Gunnison Butte to left, with Swaseys Rapids

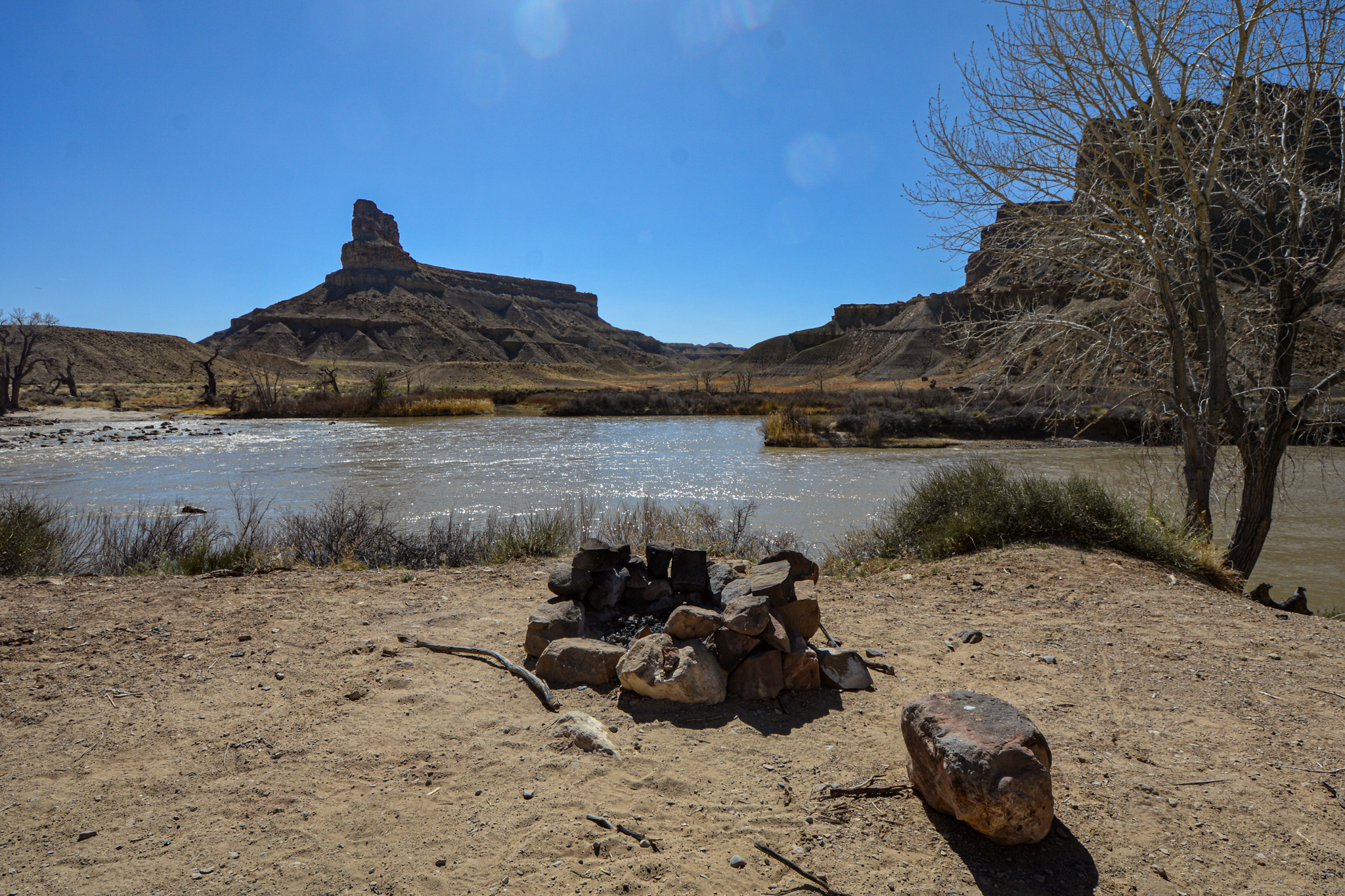

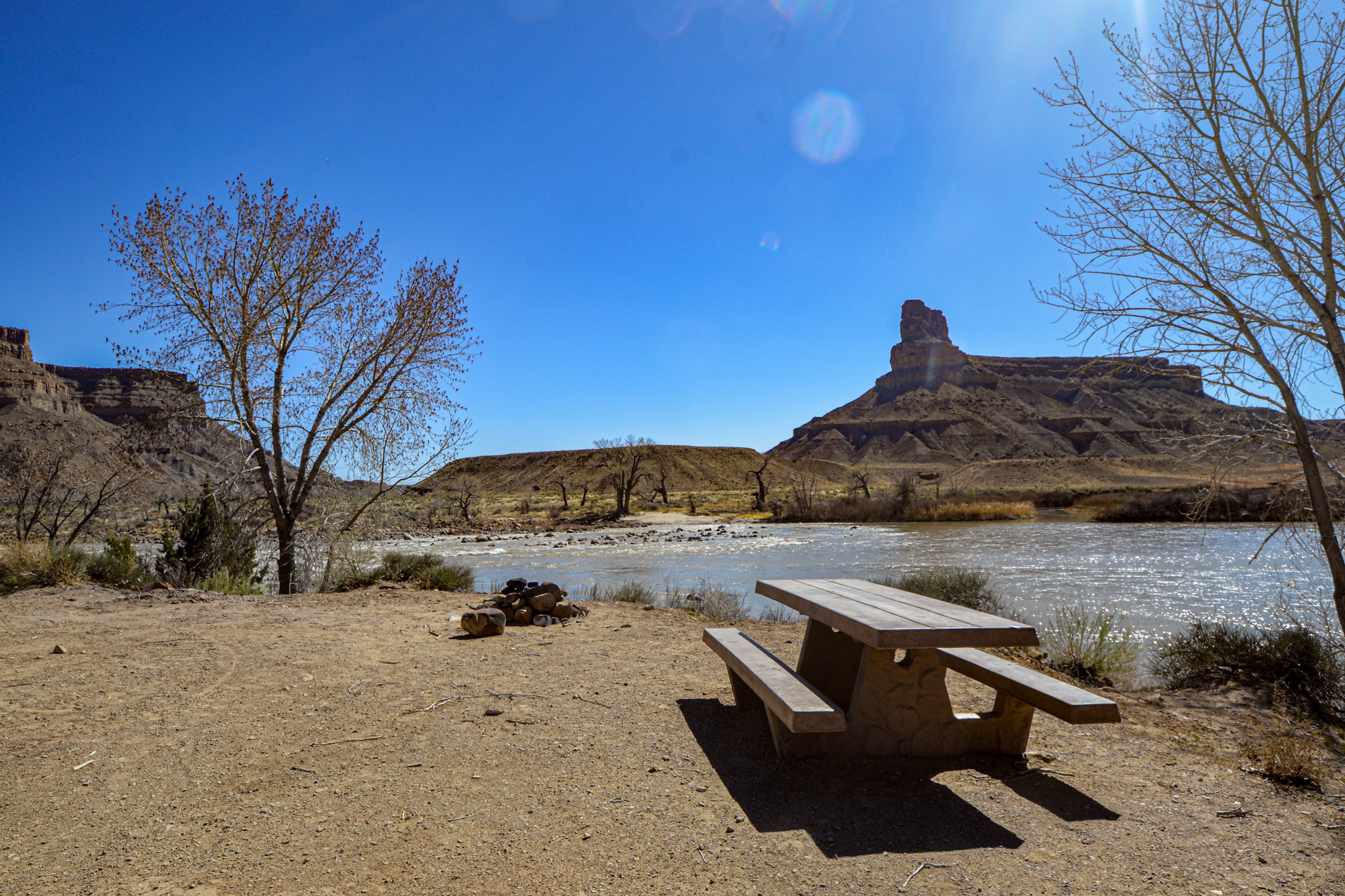

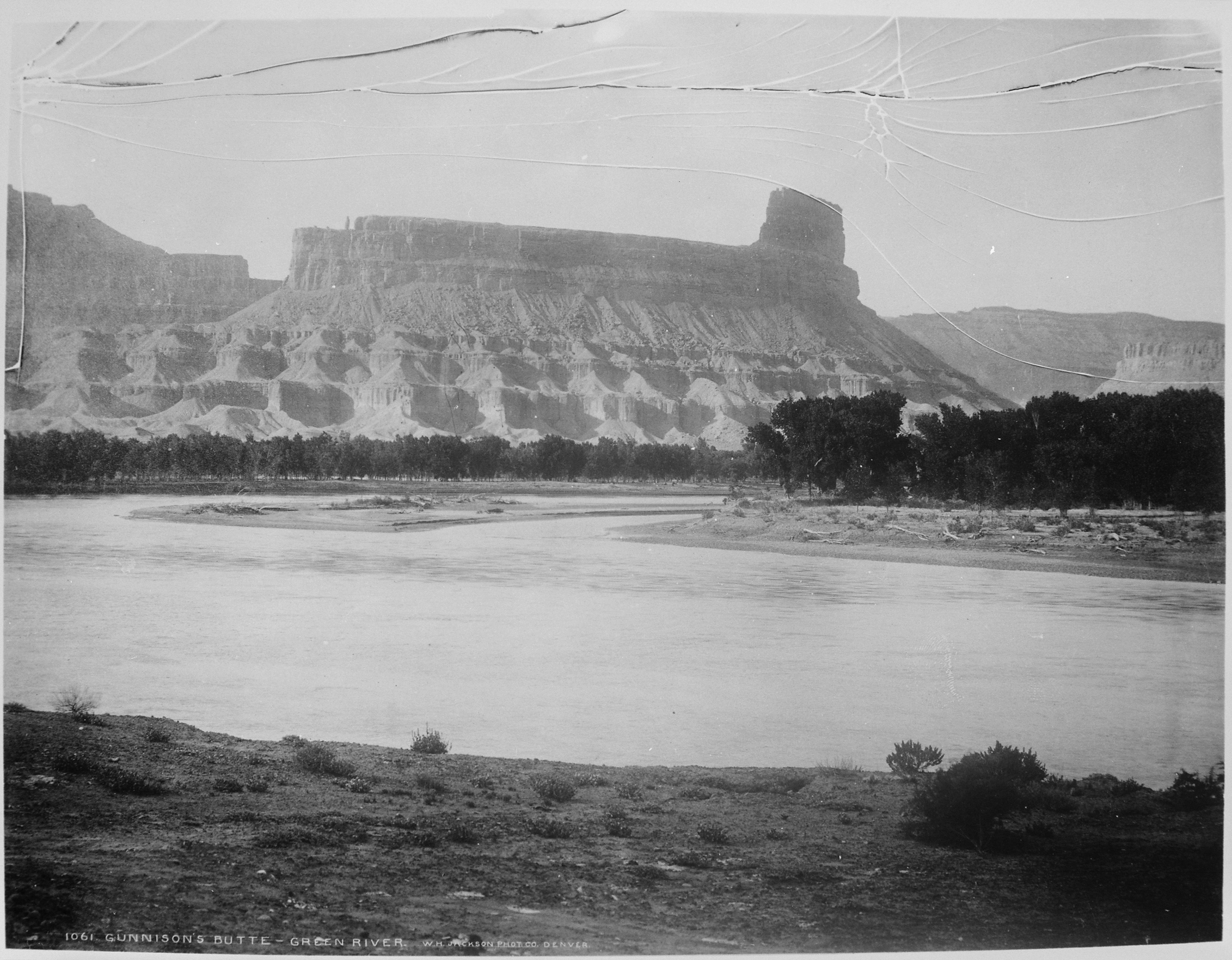
South aspect by William Henry Jackson, circa 1870s

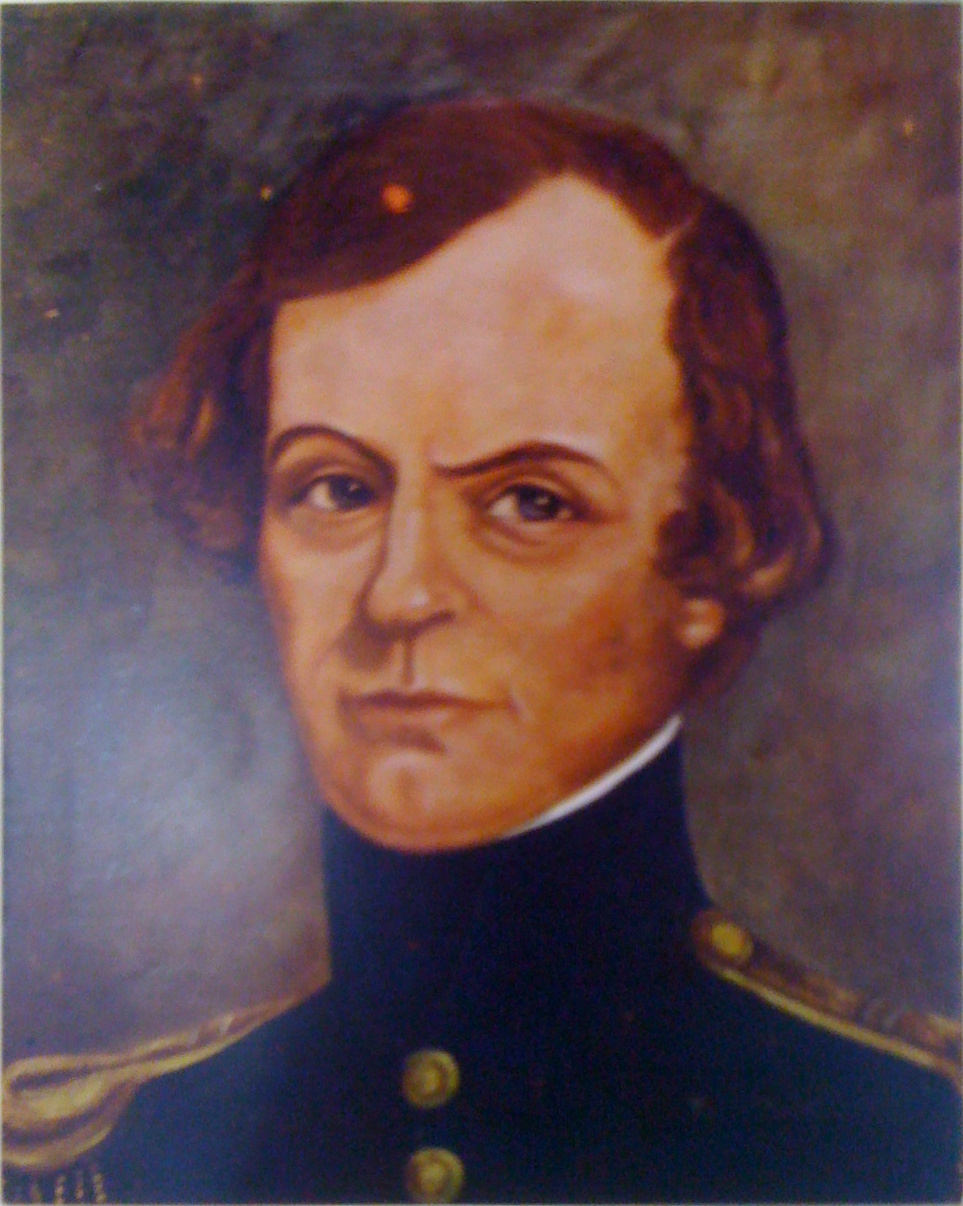
John Williams Gunnison

== See also ==
- List of mountains of Utah
