= Capt. John Gunnison House =

Historic house in New Hampshire, United States

- U.S. National Register of Historic Places
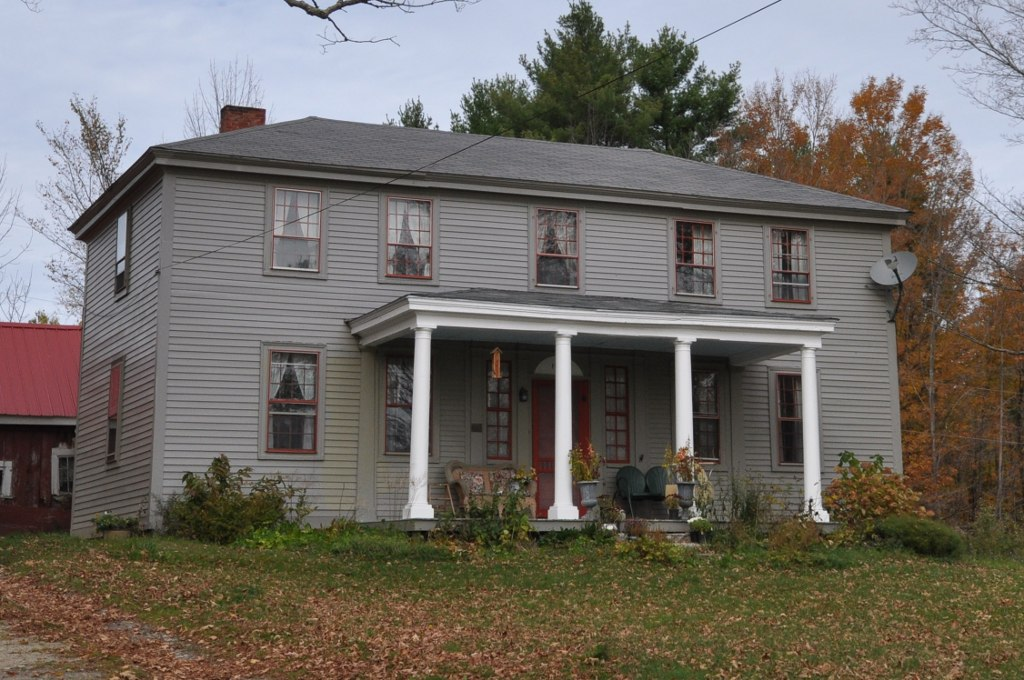

- Location within New Hampshire Location within the United States
- Location: Goshen Center Rd., Goshen, New Hampshire
- Coordinates: 43°17′36″N 72°7′37″W
- Area: 80 acres (32 ha)
- Built: 1812
- Architectural style: Federal
- NRHP reference No.: 79000214
- Added to NRHP: December 19, 1979

The Capt. John Gunnison House is a historic house on Goshen Center Road in Goshen, New Hampshire. Built in 1812, it is one of the town's finer examples of Federal architecture. It was the childhood home and likely birthplace of John Williams Gunnison, a military officer who led exploratory expeditions in Colorado. The house was listed on the National Register of Historic Places in 1979.

== Description and history ==
The Captain John Gunnison House is located in a rural setting of central Goshen, on the north side of Goshen Center Road about 1 mile (1.6 km) east of New Hampshire Route 31. It is a two-story wood-frame structure, with a hip roof and clapboarded exterior. Its main facade has five bays, with the door centered, with flanking sidelight windows and a false fanlight above. A single-story porch extends across the center three bays, supported by round columns. Two interior chimneys rise behind the main roof ridge, and only one of its original four fireplaces survives. The interior includes a number of 19th-century features, including stencilwork and feather painting.

The house was built in 1812 on an 80-acre (32 ha) parcel that was one of the first to be granted in the town, to Samuel Gunnison. Explorer John Williams Gunnison was born in 1812, so this may have been the place of his birth. Gunnison was killed by Native Americans in 1853 during an exploratory expedition in what is now Utah. Geographic features in Colorado, where he also led expeditions, bear his name. The house was sold out of the Gunnison family by 1890.

== See also ==
- National Register of Historic Places listings in Sullivan County, New Hampshire
