= Edward Pierrepont Beckwith =

Edward Pierrepont Beckwith (1877–1966) was an American engineer and scientist.

Beckwith was born in New York April 27, 1877, the son of Leonard Forbes and Margaretta Willoughby Pierrepont Beckwith.

He graduated from Massachusetts Institute of Technology (MIT) in 1901. He worked for General Electric, conducting some of the first experiments with tungsten as a filament for electric lamps. Additional experimentation included working on the purification of water, iron oxidation, and the use of mercury in silica tubes.

Beckwith was an avid mountaineer and climbed the Swiss Alps and the Austrian Dolomites soon after graduation from university. He was elected a member of The Explorers Club in New York in 1930. After he retired, he participated as an observer, navigator, and photographer on scientific expeditions, including the Carnegie Institute's Mount McKinley Cosmic Ray Expedition in 1932, the Rainbow Bridge-Monument Valley Expedition of 1937 (which mapped 2000 square miles in southern Utah and northern Arizona), and the 1939-40 Fairchild Tropical Expedition in the Philippines and the Dutch East Indies aboard Cheng Ho.

Beckwith appeared in Who's Who of Engineering in 1922.

Beckwith died on July 5, 1966, at the age of 89, of a heart attack while driving his car alone.
