= John Williams Gunnison =

19th-century American explorer

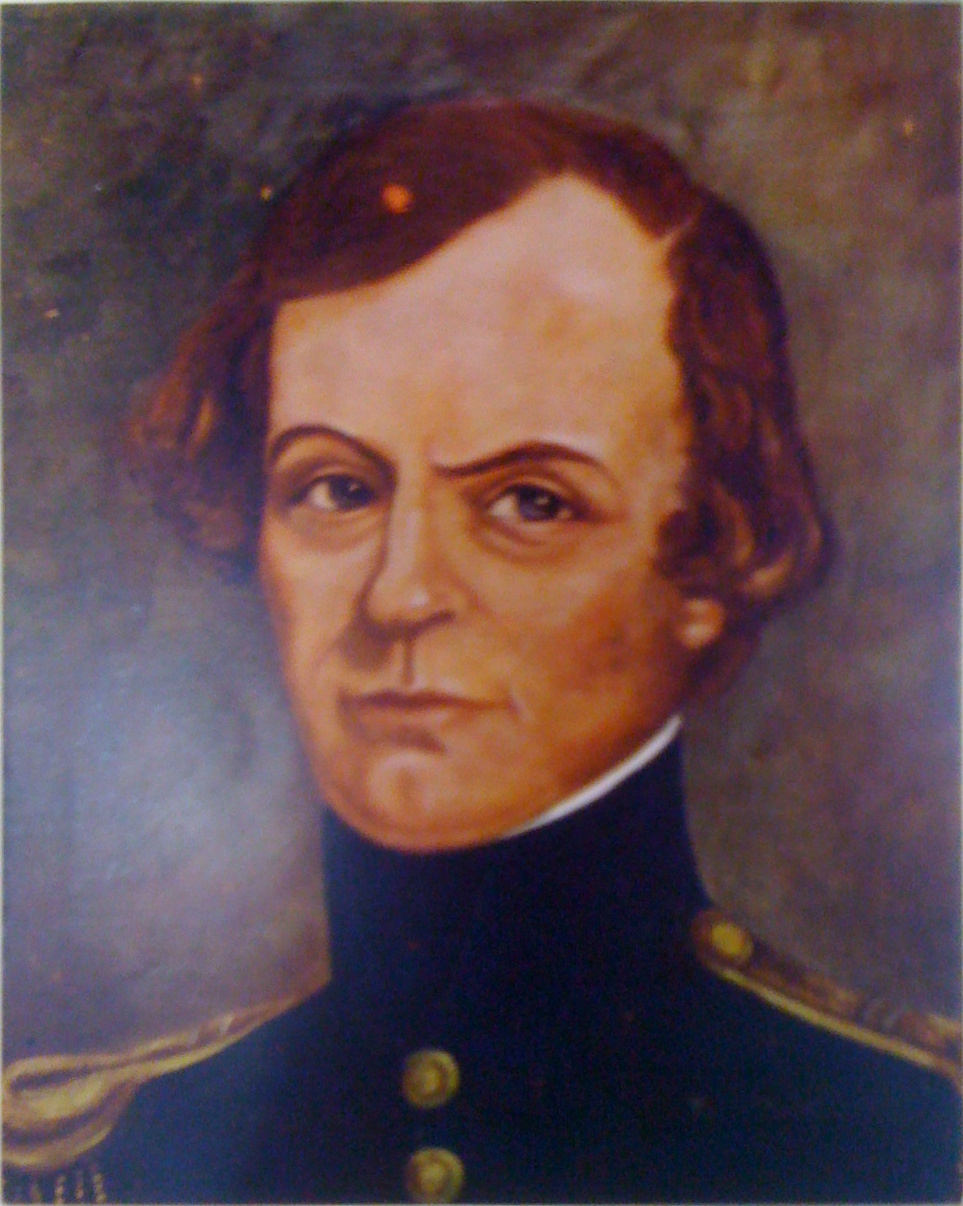
- Born: November 11, 1812; Goshen, New Hampshire, U.S.
- Died: October 26, 1853 (aged 40); Millard County, Utah Territory
- Cause of death: Murder by Pahvant Utes
- Resting place: 39.280789°N 112.778008°W
- Education: United States Military Academy at West Point, New York
- Occupation: Captain in the Corps of Topographical Engineers - Surveyor
- Employer: United States Army
- Known for: Exploration and surveying of Florida, the Great Lakes and the Western United States
- Spouse: Martha A. Delony (m. 1841–1853)

John Williams Gunnison (November 11, 1812 – October 26, 1853) was an American military officer and explorer.

== Biography ==
Gunnison was born in Goshen, New Hampshire, in 1812 and attended Hopkinton Academy in Hopkinton, New Hampshire. He graduated from West Point in 1837, second in his class of fifty cadets. His military career began as an artillery officer in Florida, where he spent a year in the campaign against the Seminoles. Due to his poor health he was reassigned to the U.S. Army Corps of Topographical Engineers the next year. Initially he explored unknown areas of Florida, searching for provision routes. However, his health soon forced him out of Florida entirely.

From 1841 to 1849 Gunnison explored the area around the Great Lakes. He surveyed the border between Wisconsin and Michigan, the western coast of Lake Michigan, and the coast of Lake Erie. On May 9, 1846, he was promoted to first lieutenant.

In the spring of 1849 Gunnison was assigned as second in command of the Howard Stansbury expedition to explore and survey the valley of the Great Salt Lake. That winter was particularly heavy and the expedition was unable to leave the valley. Gunnison took the opportunity to befriend some Mormons and study the Church of Jesus Christ of Latter-day Saints. When he finally returned to Washington, DC, he wrote a book titled The Mormons or Latter-Day Saints, in the Valley of the Great Salt Lake: A History of Their Rise and Progress, Peculiar Doctrines, Present Condition.

Gunnison returned to the Great Lakes from 1851 to 1853, mapping the Green Bay area, and was promoted to captain on March 3, 1853.

== Gunnison–Beckwith expedition ==
On May 3, 1853, he received orders to take charge of an expedition to survey a route for a Pacific railroad between the 38th and 39th parallels. The surveying party left St. Louis, Missouri, in June 1853 and arrived by mid-October in Manti, Utah Territory. In Utah Territory, with Lieutenant E. G. Beckwith as assistant commander, Gunnison began the survey of a possible route, surveying areas across the Rocky Mountains via the Huerfano River, through Cochetopa Pass, and by way of the present Gunnison and Green rivers to the Sevier River. His journey took him through the Tomichi Valley in Colorado, where the town of Gunnison is named in his honor. After crossing the Tomichi Valley, the survey team encountered the Black Canyon, carved by the Gunnison River which was also named in his honor. The team was forced to turn south to get around the canyon.

=== Attack and massacre ===
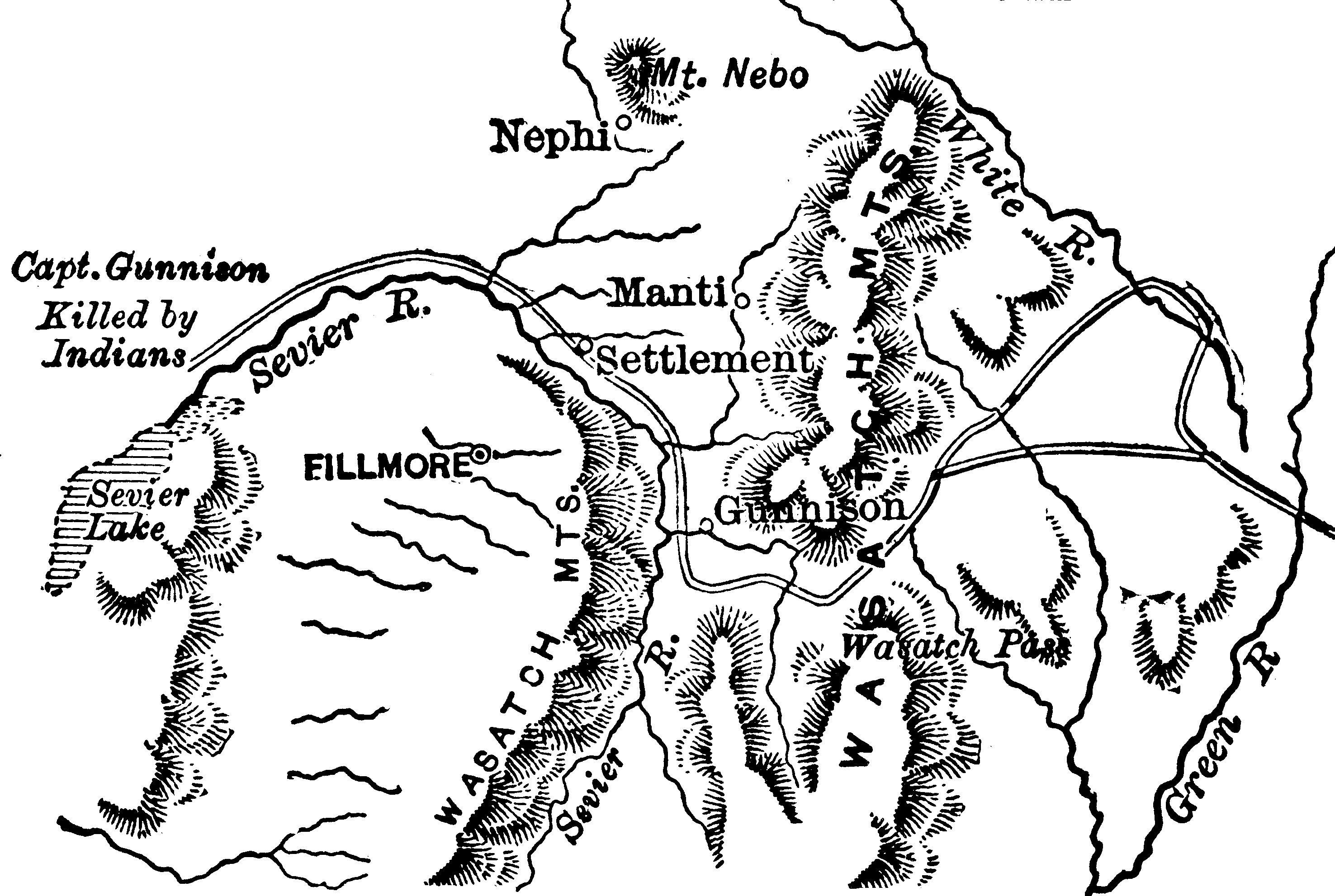

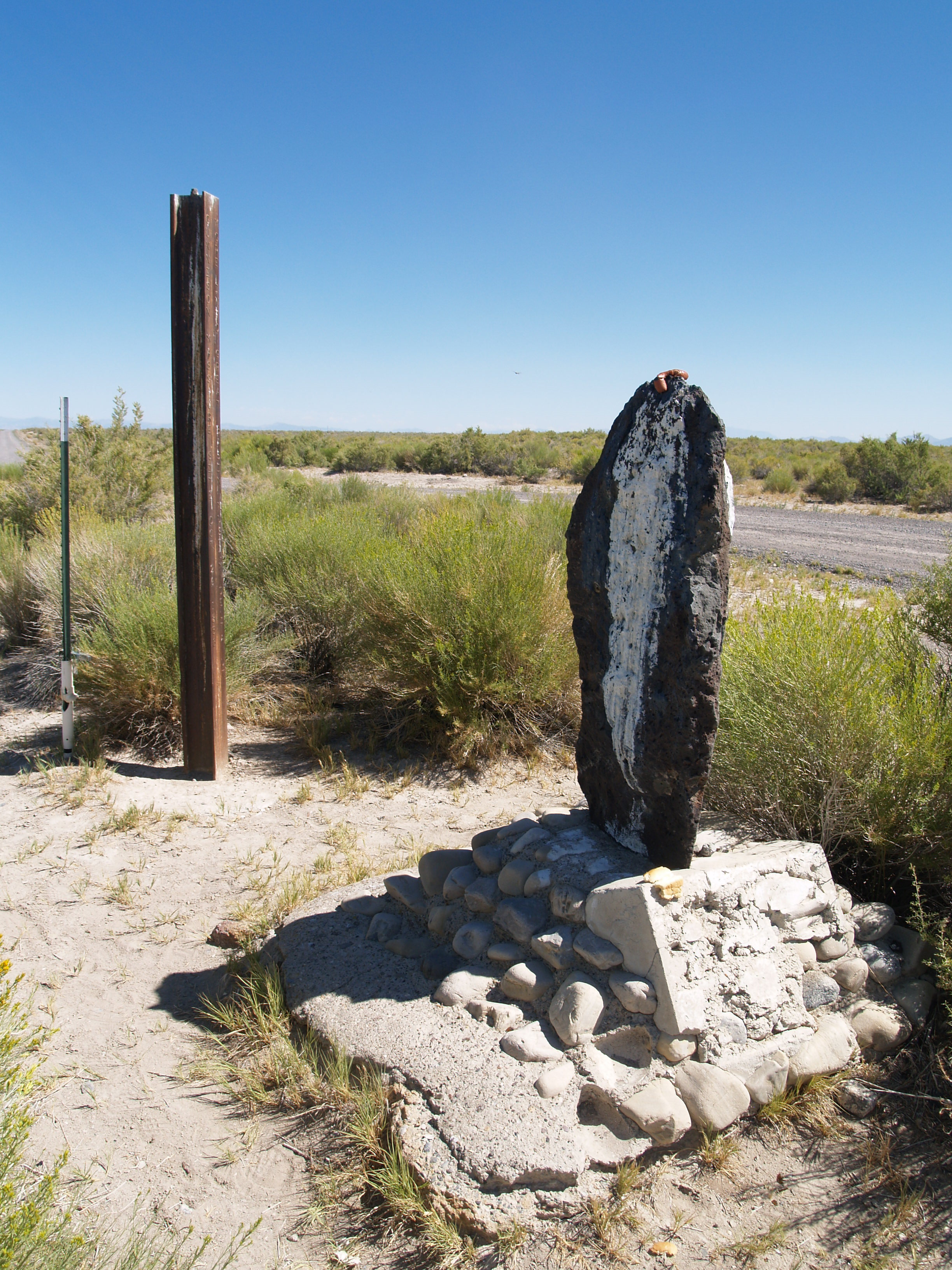
Two small markers at the site, 2008

The weather was beginning to turn "cold and raw" with snow flurries, and Captain Gunnison sought to speed up mapping before returning to winter quarters. Several miles upstream of Sevier Lake (about the site of the present Gunnison Bend Reservoir), the team was divided into two detachments. Gunnison and his party of 11 men moved downstream, while the other party moved upstream. On the morning of October 26, 1853, Gunnison's party was attacked by a band of Pahvants (Ute). In the resulting massacre, Gunnison and seven of his men were killed. Several survivors of the attack alerted the other detachment of the survey team, who rode to aid Gunnison and his party. An additional survivor of the attack and the bodies of the victims were retrieved later that day. The remains of the eight dead were found in a mutilated state. Killed with Gunnison were Richard Hovenden Kern (topographer & artist; 1821-1853), Frederick Creutzfeldt (German botanist), William Washington Potter (Mormon guide; 1819-1853), Private Caulfield, Private Liptoote, Private Mehreens, and John Bellows (camp roustabout). The site of the massacre was added to the National Register of Historic Places on April 30, 1976.

- Gunnison Massacre Site
- U.S. National Register of Historic Places
- Location within Utah
- Nearest city: Hinckley, Utah
- Coordinates: 39°16′45.7″N 112°46′43.7″W
- Area: 81 acres (33 ha)
- Built: 1853
- NRHP reference No.: 76001819
- Added to NRHP: April 30, 1976

=== Investigations and allegations ===
Most contemporary accounts of the massacre maintain that the Mormons warned Gunnison that his party might be in danger from local bands of Pahvant Utes. It seems that Gunnison had entered Utah in the midst of the Walker War, a sometimes bloody conflict between the Mormons and the Ute Chief Walkara. Indeed, Lt. Beckwith later wrote that the expedition found the local Mormons "all gathered into a village for mutal protection against the Utah Indians." But after the killings, rumors circulated that the Pahvants involved in the massacre were acting under the direction of Brigham Young and an alleged secret militia known as the Danites. Some claim that leaders of the Church of Jesus Christ of Latter-day Saints were initially concerned that the railway would increase the influx of non-Mormon settlers and non-Mormon economic concerns into the territory. However, the Utah Legislature (dominated by LDS officials) had repeatedly petitioned Congress for both a transcontinental railroad and telegraph lines to pass through the region. When the railroad finally came to Utah, LDS leaders organized cadres of Mormon workers to build the railway, welcoming the income for the economically depressed community.

Martha Gunnison, widow of Captain Gunnison, was one of those who maintained that the attack was planned and orchestrated by militant Mormons under the direction of Brigham Young. Gunnison's letters to his wife throughout the expedition left her with the impression that "the Mormons were the directors of my husband's murder." She wrote to Associate Justice W.W. Drummond, the 1855 federal appointee to the Supreme Court of the Territory of Utah. She received confirmation of this belief in his response to her letter. Drummond drew this conclusion from informant and witness testimonies in several trials after the murders. He cited numerous reports by whites and natives of white attackers dressed up as Indians during the massacre.

In 1854 Lieutenant Colonel Edward Steptoe was sent by the War Department to investigate the attack and determine the truth of rumors that Mormons had colluded with the Indians in the ambush. As a result of his investigation eight Ute Indians were charged and tried for the attack. Three were convicted of manslaughter. He did not uncover evidence of Mormon involvement.

Lt. Beckwith also concluded that the Mormons had nothing to do with the attack and that the Pahvants acted alone. He wrote in his official report that the "statement which has from time to time appeared (or been copied) in various newspapers...charging the Mormons or Mormon authorities with instigating the Indians to, if not actually aiding them in, the murder of Captain Gunnison and his associates, is, I believe, not only entirely false, but there is no accidental circumstance connected with it affording the slightest foundation for such a charge."

Nevertheless, the Gunnison Massacre resulted in much controversy and added additional strain to the relationship between Governor Brigham Young of the Utah Territory and the federal government. This incident contributed to tensions eventually leading to the Utah War, wherein President Buchanan sent the U.S. Army to the Utah Territory in order to stop a reported Mormon insurrection.

== Legacy ==
The Capt. John Gunnison House in Goshen, New Hampshire, has been listed on the National Register of Historic Places. Gunnison is featured on a New Hampshire historical marker (number 140) along New Hampshire Route 10 in Goshen. Several places have been named in honor of him:

- The city of Gunnison, Utah
- The city of Gunnison, Colorado
- The Gunnison River in Colorado, and by extension Black Canyon of the Gunnison National Park, the Gunnison Basin, and the Gunnison grouse.
- Gunnison County, Colorado
- Gunnison National Forest
- Gunnison Reservoir in central Utah
- Gunnison Island in the Great Salt Lake
- Gunnison Avenue in Grand Rapids, Michigan where Gunnison resided and owned land in the 1840s
- Gunnison Swamp, a now-drained swamp in Grand Rapids later used as a town dump and then developed as a residential section
- Gunnison Lake in Goshen, New Hampshire
- Battery Gunnison, a six-inch rapid-fire disappearing gun coastal artillery battery built in 1902 at Fort Hancock, New Jersey. It served in protecting New York Harbor from 1904 to 1948, and is undergoing restoration to its 1940s configuration.
- Gunnison Beach, a beach within the Sandy Hook unit of the Fort Hancock and the Sandy Hook Proving Ground Historic District which is the Sandy Hook Unit of Gateway National Recreation Area, on the Atlantic coast of New Jersey.
- Gunnison's prairie dog
- Gunnison Butte, Emery County, Utah

== Publications ==
- Beckwith, E. G.; Gunnison, J. W. (1856). Report of explorations for a route for the Pacific railroad: Near the 38th and 39th parallels of north latitude: From the mouth of the Kansas River, Mo., to the Sevier Lake, in the Great Basin. Washington [D.C.]: War Dept. OCLC 8497072.
- Gunnison, J. W.; William Gilpin (1859). Guide to the Kansas gold mines at Pike's Peak, describing the routes, camping places, tools, outfits, etc. Cincinnati: E. Mendenhall. OCLC 14140433.
- Gunnison, J. W. (Lieut.) (1852). The Mormons, or, Latter-day saints, in the valley of the Great Salt Lake: A history of their rise and progress, peculiar doctrines, present condition, and prospects, derived from personal observation: During a residence among them. Philadelphia: J. B. Lippincott & Co. OCLC 14155212.
- Gunnison, John Williams (1832). Papers of J. W. Gunnison. OCLC 122382994. (Housed at the Huntington Library in San Marino, California)
- Gunnison, John Williams (1841). U.S. Lake Survey payrolls and reports. OCLC 145786406. (Housed at the Wisconsin Historical Society in Madison, Wisconsin, on the campus of the University of Wisconsin–Madison )
- Stansbury, Howard; John Williams Gunnison; Carrington, Albert; Hudson, John (1849). Stansbury Survey diaries. United States. Army. Corps of Topographical Engineers. OCLC 215072134. (Housed at the University of California, Berkeley Library in Berkeley, California)
- United States; Henry, J.; Baird, S.F. (1855). Reports of explorations and surveys to ascertain the most practicable and economical route for a railroad from the Mississippi River to the Pacific Ocean. Washington [D.C.]: B. Tucker, printer. OCLC 10526736.
