= Edward Griffin Beckwith =

United States Army officer and explorer (1818–1881)

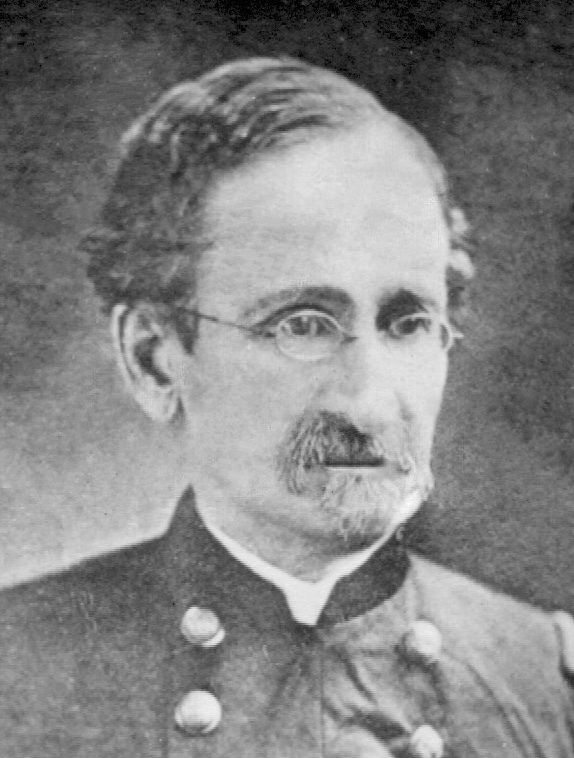
- Edward Griffin Beckwith, c. 1863
- Born: June 25, 1818; Cazenovia, New York, US
- Died: June 22, 1881 (aged 62); Clifton, New York, US
- Resting place: Arlington National Cemetery
- Occupation(s): Soldier and explorer

Edward Griffin Beckwith (June 25, 1818 – June 22, 1881) was a United States Army officer who served in the Union Army during the American Civil War and who conducted one of the Pacific Railroad Surveys in the 1850s and became known as the "Explorer of the Central Rockies".

== Biography ==
Beckwith was born on June 25, 1818 (some report a January birthdate) in Cazenovia, New York, son of Judge Barak Beckwith, and Polly (Kennedy) Beckwith. He graduated from West Point in 1842.

He served in garrison at Savannah, Georgia as a second lieutenant of the Third Artillery until 1846, when he was appointed for recruiting service. He was promoted First lieutenant June 18, 1846, and took an active part in the Mexican–American War; he was present at Tampico and Vera Cruz. Beckwith was engaged in the Pacific Railroad Survey from 1853 to 1857 with John Williams Gunnison. Notably, the First transcontinental railroad followed his recommended route. His report, which also included an extensive survey of the Great Salt Lake, contained "much information on the plants, animals, climate, and geographical features of the lands he had explored". He succeeded Gunnison as leader of the survey after his death, and personally recommended the route for the railroad. He was also involved with constructing military roads in Nebraska and Kansas, between 1857 and 1859.

Beckwith was promoted captain May 12, 1855, and served during the American Civil War in the commissary department from 1861 to 1865, with the exception of a few weeks in 1863, when he acted as provost-marshal-general of the department of the Gulf, and again when placed for a short time (August 1863 – January 1864) in command of the defenses of New Orleans. On February 8, 1864, he was promoted major, and on March 13, 1865, was brevetted lieutenant-colonel, colonel, and brigadier-general of volunteers. He continued in the service of the commissary department until he was mustered out on May 31, 1866.

== Personal life ==
Beckwith married Cornelia Williamson (1828–1911), with whom he had a daughter, Madeline Julia Beckwith (1852–1935). He died at Clifton, New York, in 1881, and was buried at Arlington National Cemetery, Arlington, Virginia.

== See also ==
- Gunnison–Beckwith Expedition
