= Utah State Route 159 =

State highway in Utah, United States

State Route 159

Route information
- Maintained by UDOT
- Length: 8.018 mi (12.904 km)
- Existed: 1979–present

Major junctions
- South end: SR-21 in Garrison
- North end: US 6 / US 50 in Border

Location
- Country: United States
- State: Utah
- Counties: Millard

Highway system
- Utah State Highway System; Interstate; US; State; Minor; Scenic
← SR-158	→ SR-160

State Route 159 (SR-159) is a state highway in west-central Utah that runs from the junction of SR-21 in Garrison to US-6/US-50 8 miles (13 km) to the north near Border by the Nevada border. There are no junctions with any other state highways along SR-159.

== Route description ==
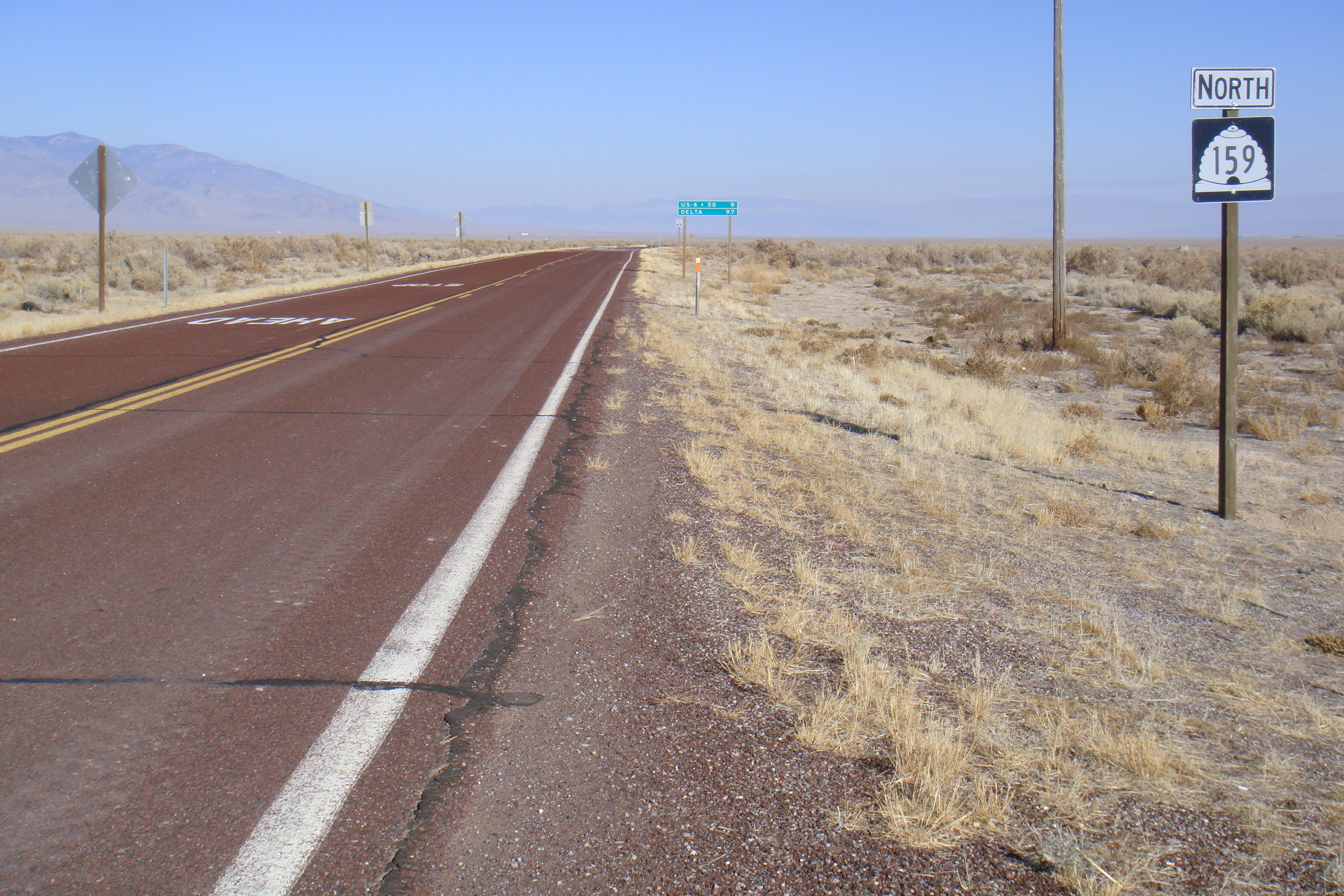
View of SR-159, looking north from Garrison, Utah.

This short highway is mainly used as a cutoff for local Snake Valley residents between Garrison (and SR-21) and the main road in the valley, US-6/50. Motorists traveling from the south to the east, and vice versa, use the SR-159 cutoff. The road does "continue" north of US-6/50 as a dirt road, known commonly as the "Gandy Road." This road travels up Snake Valley toward Gandy, Callao, and eventually to Wendover.

== History ==
The route number "159" was previously used for other roads in the state system, including what is now SR 111 (western Salt Lake Valley) from 1933 to 1945 and the Dividend, Utah road from 1945 to 1969.

The current incarnation of SR-159 was designated in 1979 by the Utah State legislature, and has not been changed since.

== Major intersections ==
The entire route is in Millard County.

Location	mi	km	Destinations	Notes
Garrison	0.000	0.000	SR-21 – Baker, Garrison, Milford	Southern terminus
Border	8.018	12.904	US 6 / US 50 – Ely, Delta	Northern terminus Utah-Nevada line
1.000 mi = 1.609 km; 1.000 km = 0.621 mi

== See also ==
- List of state highways in Utah
