= Utah State Route 21 =

State highway in Millard and Beaver counties in Utah, United States

State Route 21
- SR-21 highlighted in red

Route information
- Maintained by UDOT
- Length: 107.575 mi (173.125 km)
- Existed: 1910 as a state highway; 1927 as SR-21–present

Major junctions
- West end: SR 487 at the Nevada border in Garrison
- SR-159 in Garrison; SR-257 near Milford; SR-130 near Minersville; SR-310 near Minersville
- East end: SR-160 / I-15 BL in Beaver

Location
- Country: United States
- State: Utah

Highway system
- Utah State Highway System; Interstate; US; State; Minor; Scenic
← SR-20	→ SR-22

State Route 21 (SR-21) is a state highway in western Utah, running for 107.575 miles (173.125 km) in Millard and Beaver Counties from the Nevada state line near Garrison to Beaver.

== Route description ==
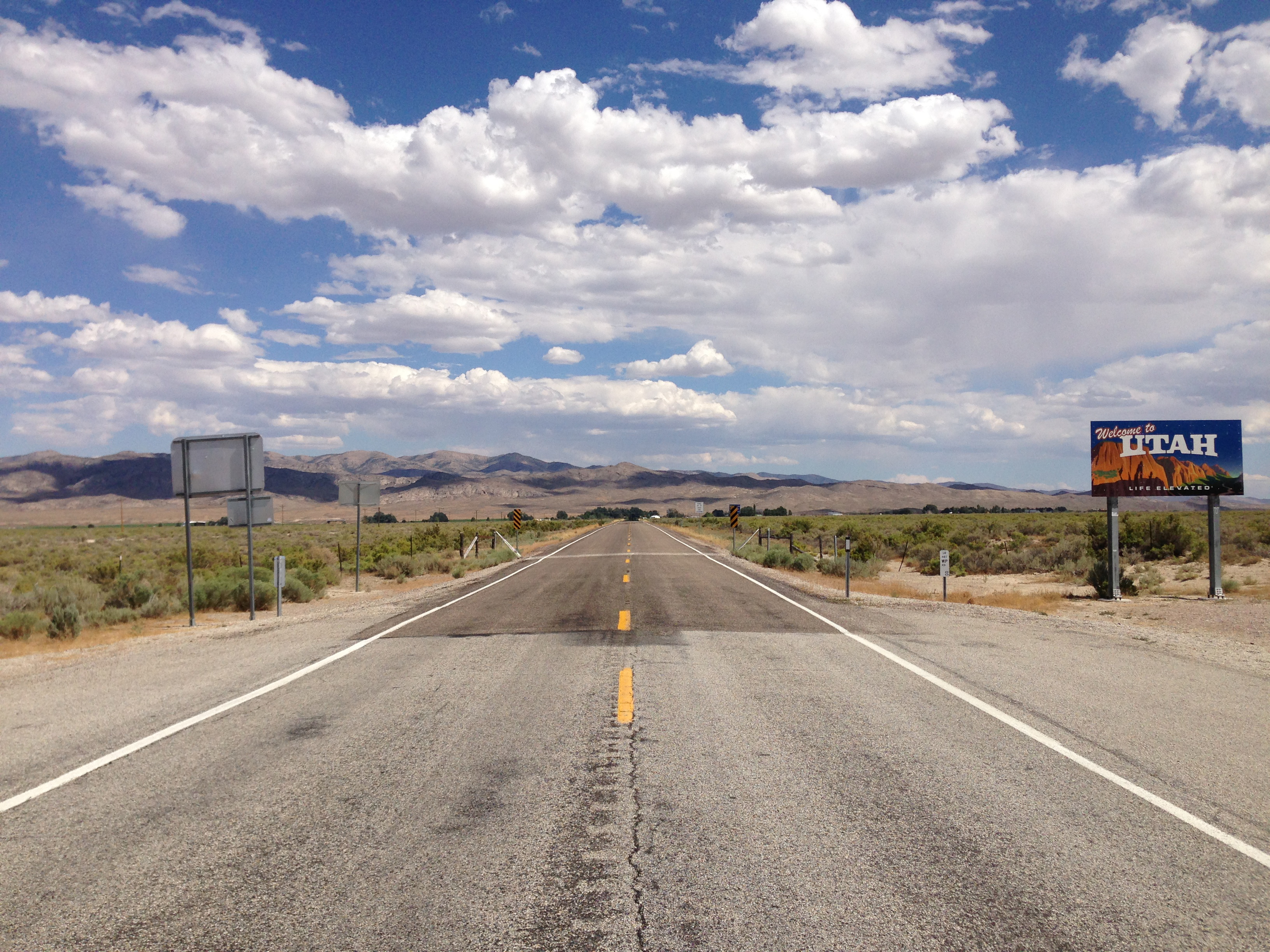
View east from the west end of SR-21 at the Nevada state line

SR-21 begins at the Nevada state line as a continuation of Nevada State Route 487 and heads southeast through Garrison. It continues southeast past Pruess Lake and continues through Mormon Gap and Halfway Summit. It turns east around Lime Point into Corral Canyon and over Wah Wah Summit. It then heads southeast between Grampian Hill and Squaw Peak into Squaw Gulch, where it turns northeast over Frisco Summit and east through the ghost town of Frisco. It then turns southeast and continues to Milford. SR-21 leaves Milford heading southeast across an agricultural area to Minersville. In Minersville, it turns east past Yellow Mountain, then turns northeast past Minersville Lake State Park. It continues through Adamsville, then turns east around Little Bald Hill through Greenville into Beaver. In Beaver, it crosses I-15 without an interchange, the continues to end at an intersection with Business Loop I-15 (SR-160).

== History ==
The road from SR-1 (by 1926 US-91, now SR-160) in Beaver west to Milford was added to the state highway system in 1910, and it was extended west to Newhouse in 1916. The state legislature assigned the SR-21 designation to the route in 1927, and continued it northwest from Newhouse to the Nevada state line, where it became SR 73 towards Ely. In 1941, SR-21 was extended east from Beaver to US-89 at Junction, but this became SR-153 in 1945.

== Major intersections ==
County	Location	mi	km	Destinations	Notes
Millard	Garrison	0.000	0.000	SR 487 north to US 6 / US 50 – Baker	Western terminus
Millard	Garrison	1.025	1.650	SR-159 north to US 6 / US 50 – Delta	
Beaver	Milford	76.920	123.791	SR-257 north (Main Street) – Delta, Salt Lake City	
Beaver	Minersville	90.498	145.642	SR-130 south (Center Street) – Cedar City	
Beaver	Minersville	96.432	155.192	SR-310 north	
Beaver	Beaver	107.575	173.125	SR-160 (Main Street) / I-15 BL to I-15	Eastern terminus
1.000 mi = 1.609 km; 1.000 km = 0.621 mi
