= Tintic School District =

School district in Utah, United States

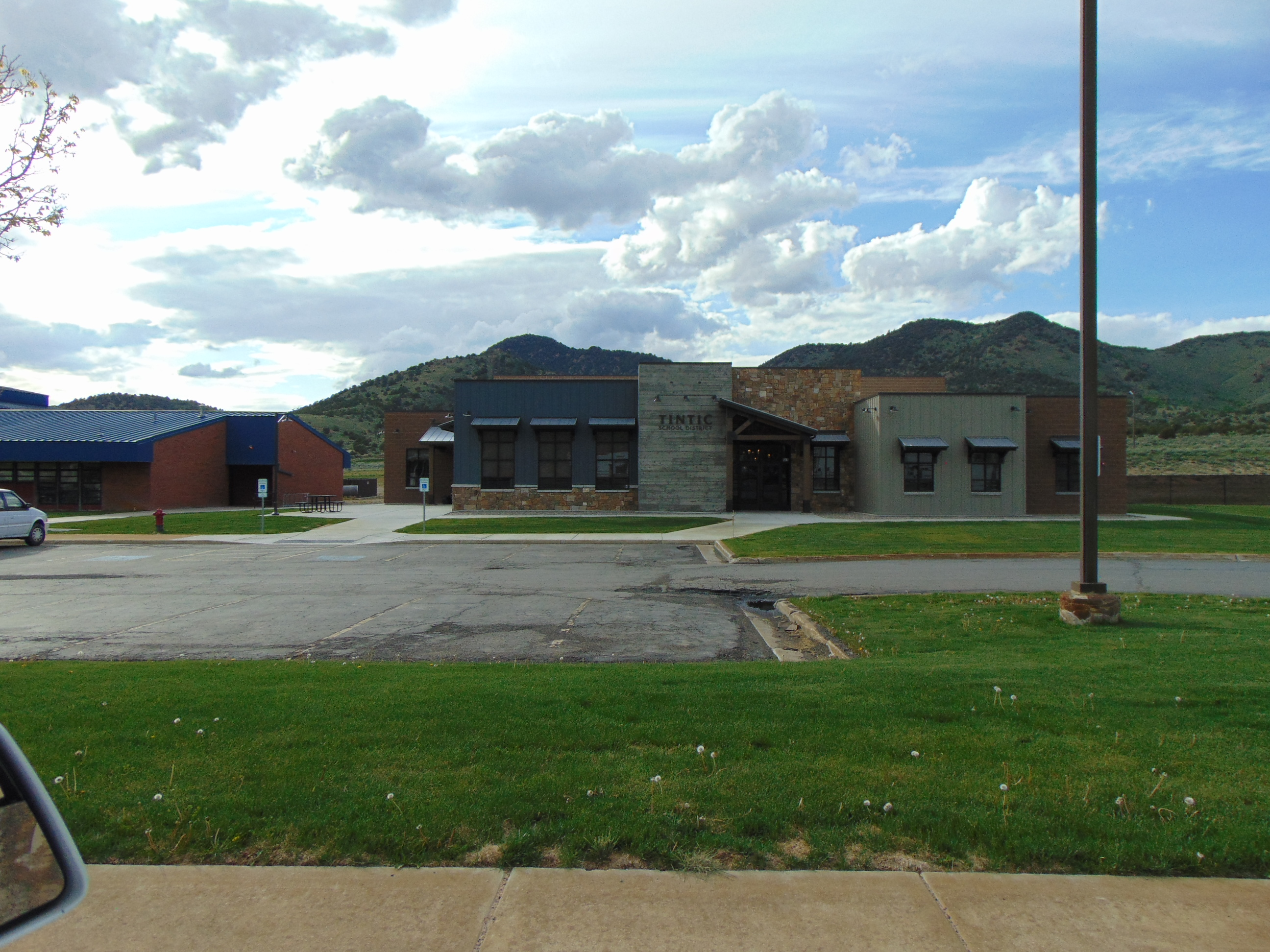
- The school district office building in Eureka, May 2016

Address
- 545 East Main Street; PO Box 210 Eureka, Utah, 84628; United States

District information
- Type: Public
- Grades: PK to 12
- Established: 1914
- Superintendent: Kodey Hughes
- Governing agency: Utah Department of Education
- Schools: 2 elementary schools; 2 high schools
- NCES District ID: 4901020

Students and staff
- Students: 228
- Teachers: 18

Other information
- Schedule: M-F except state holidays
- Website: www.tintic.org

Tintic School District is a school district located in western Juab County, Utah, United States.

== Description ==
The district serves the western part of Juab County, while the Juab School District serves the very eastern portion (along the Interstate 15 corridor). In addition to the residents of the more than 2,100 square miles (5,400 km^{2}) of western Juab County, the district also serves several out of state students (from White Pine County, Nevada). (Note: The main population areas served by the district are the West Desert area (the area near the Nevada border on the far west end of the county, including communities of Callao, Partoun, and Trout Creek) and the Eureka area (the U.S. Route 6 corridor near the eastern end of the county). Even though the driving distance between the two areas is considerable (136 miles [219 km]), accessibility between the two areas is substantially greater since 50 miles (80 km) of the normal travel route is on gravel road. Occasionally, due to weather conditions, the only reasonably access to the western area is by way of Wendover, Utah, a 248 miles (399 km) drive.) The district is the second smallest of the 41 school districts within the state.

== History ==
The Tintic School District was established in 1914 when the existing school districts in Eureka, Knightsville, Mammoth, Silver City, and the West Desert (the area near the Nevada border on the far west end of the county, including communities of Callao, Partoun, and Trout Creek) were consolidated. It originally served the children of the many mining workers of the Tintic Mining District, but as the mining industry in the area declined, so has the number of students.

== Communities served ==
The Tintic School District serves the following communities:

- Callao
- Eureka
- Mammoth
- Partoun
- Trout Creek

== Schools ==
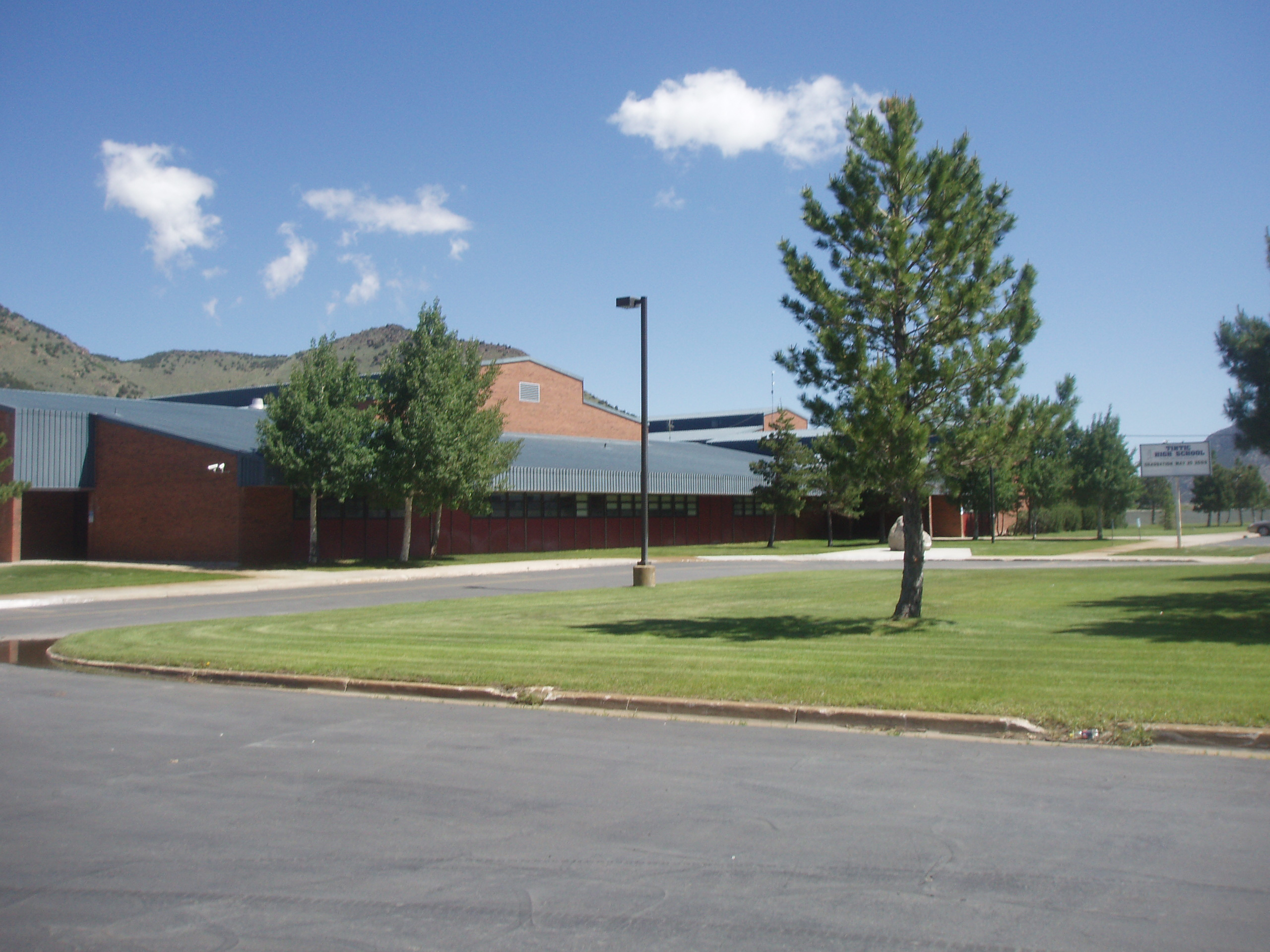
Tintic High School in Eureka, Utah, June 2009

The following are schools within the Tintic School District:

=== Elementary schools ===
- Eureka Elementary School - Eureka
- West Desert Elementary School - Trout Creek

=== High schools ===
- Tintic High School - Eureka
- West Desert High School - Trout Creek

== See also ==
- List of school districts in Utah
- Juab School District
