= Utah State Route 159 (disambiguation) =

State Route 159

Location
- Country: United States
- State: Utah

Highway system
- Utah State Highway System; Interstate; US; State; Minor; Scenic
← SR-158	→ SR-160

Utah State Route 159 may refer to:

- Utah State Route 159, a state highway on the western edge of Millard County, Utah, United States, that runs parallel to the Utah-Nevada border.
- Utah State Route 159 (1945-1969), a former state highway on the western edge of Utah County, Utah, United States, that essentially formed a business loop off U.S. Route 6, running along Dividend Road through the community of Dividend.
- Utah State Route 159 (1933-1945), a former state highway in southwestern Salt Lake County, Utah, United States, that ran west from Riverton to Lark and then north to Magna.

== See also ==
- List of state highways in Utah
- List of highways numbered 159
