= Utah State Route 161 (disambiguation) =

Utah State Route 161 may refer to:

- Utah State Route 161 (1933-1935), a former state highway near Woodruff
- Utah State Route 161 (1935-1953), a former state highway connecting Draper to Bluffdale
- Utah State Route 161 (1961-1964), a former state highway in Beaver
- Utah State Route 161, the modern route through Cove Fort

== See also ==
- List of highways numbered 161
