= Eskdale =

Eskdale may refer to:

== Australia ==
- Eskdale, Queensland
- Eskdale, Victoria

== New Zealand ==
- Eskdale, New Zealand

== United Kingdom ==
- Eskdale, Cumbria, England
- Eskdale, Dumfries and Galloway, Scotland
- Eskdale, North Yorkshire, England
- Eskdale (UK Parliament constituency), Cumberland, England, former constituency

== United States ==
- EskDale, Utah, USA, a religious communal settlement of the Aaronic Order
- Eskdale, West Virginia, USA, an unincorporated community in Kanawha County

== Other uses ==
- HNoMS Eskdale was an escort destroyer of the Royal Norwegian Navy in World War II
