= EskDale, Utah =

Unincorporated community in the state of Utah, United States

- Unincorporated community
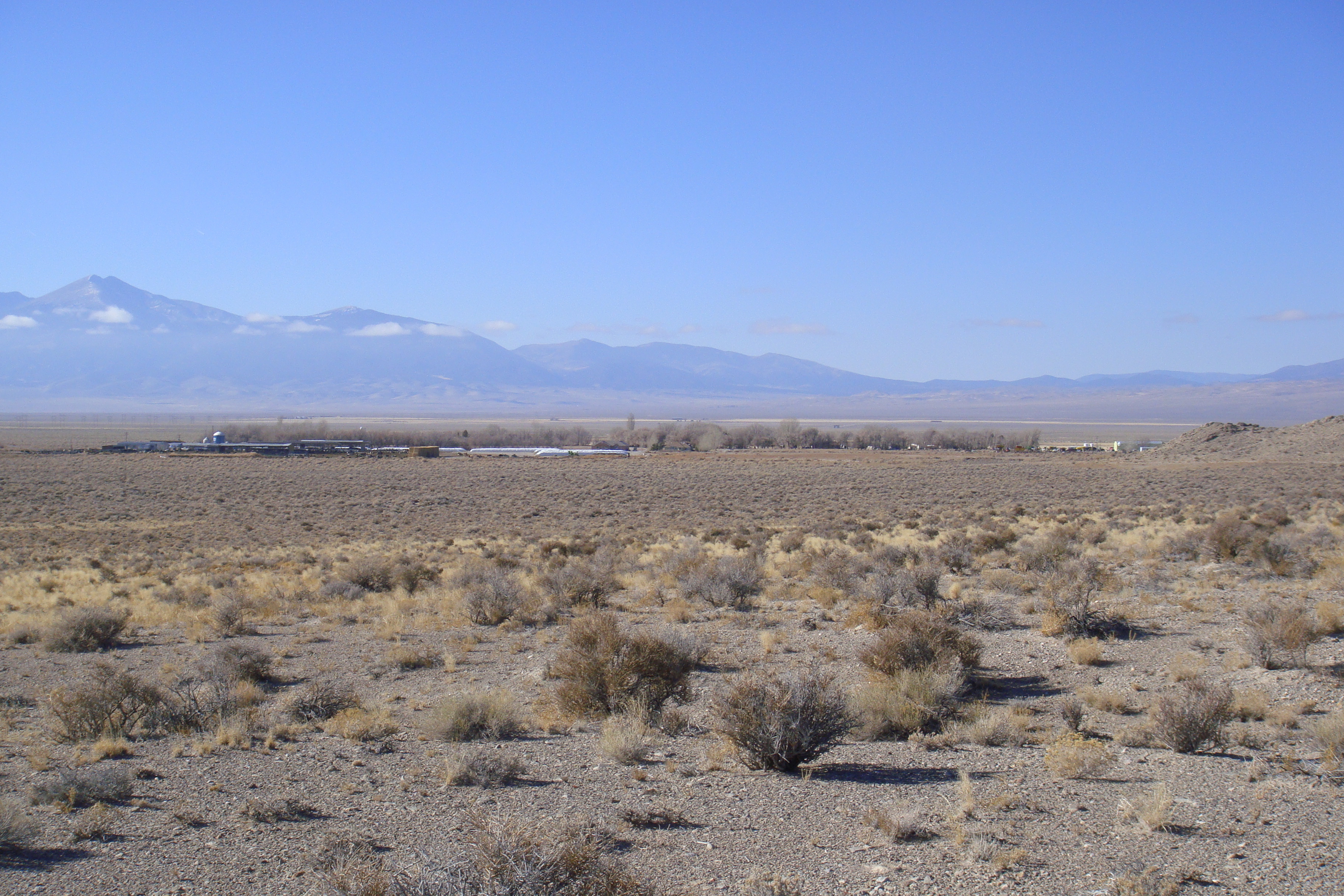
- View of Eskdale from the east, December 2009

- Location within Utah Location within the United States
- Coordinates: 39°06′26″N 113°57′09″W
- Country: United States
- State: Utah
- County: Millard
- Founded: 1955
- Named for: River Esk
- Elevation: 4,984 ft (1,519 m)
- Time zone: UTC-7 (Mountain (MST))
  - Summer (DST): UTC-6 (MDT)
- ZIP code: 84728
- Area code: 435
- GNIS feature ID: 1427841

Eskdale (sometimes written as EskDale) is an unincorporated community in western Millard County, Utah, United States, just east of the Nevada border.

== Description ==
The community is a farming commune founded by the Order of Aaron and is located in the southern part of Snake Valley, near the western flank of the Conger Range (part of the larger Confusion Range). It was founded in 1955 by Dr. M. L. Glendenning as a religious community of the House of Aaron. The name itself comes from the River Esk in Scotland.

The town is home to Eskdale High School, which serves the communities of Eskdale, Garrison, Burbank, and Baker (Nevada), along with other locals in the Snake Valley area. Eskdale is also known for its dairy production.

== Climate ==
Eskdale has a cold desert climate (Köppen: BWk).

Climate data for EskDale, Utah, 1991–2020 normals, extremes 1966–present
Month	Jan	Feb	Mar	Apr	May	Jun	Jul	Aug	Sep	Oct	Nov	Dec	Year
Record high °F (°C)	71 (22)	75 (24)	86 (30)	89 (32)	99 (37)	103 (39)	105 (41)	103 (39)	102 (39)	91 (33)	79 (26)	71 (22)	105 (41)
Mean maximum °F (°C)	57.4 (14.1)	62.9 (17.2)	74.0 (23.3)	81.3 (27.4)	89.3 (31.8)	97.0 (36.1)	100.7 (38.2)	98.2 (36.8)	92.9 (33.8)	83.9 (28.8)	70.8 (21.6)	61.3 (16.3)	101.1 (38.4)
Mean daily maximum °F (°C)	41.6 (5.3)	47.4 (8.6)	58.2 (14.6)	65.4 (18.6)	74.9 (23.8)	86.5 (30.3)	93.5 (34.2)	91.8 (33.2)	82.2 (27.9)	68.5 (20.3)	53.3 (11.8)	41.7 (5.4)	67.1 (19.5)
Daily mean °F (°C)	28.7 (−1.8)	34.2 (1.2)	43.5 (6.4)	49.8 (9.9)	58.6 (14.8)	68.9 (20.5)	76.3 (24.6)	74.5 (23.6)	64.5 (18.1)	51.5 (10.8)	38.5 (3.6)	28.7 (−1.8)	51.5 (10.8)
Mean daily minimum °F (°C)	15.8 (−9.0)	21.1 (−6.1)	28.7 (−1.8)	34.3 (1.3)	42.4 (5.8)	51.2 (10.7)	59.1 (15.1)	57.3 (14.1)	46.9 (8.3)	34.5 (1.4)	23.6 (−4.7)	15.6 (−9.1)	35.9 (2.2)
Mean minimum °F (°C)	−5.8 (−21.0)	1.1 (−17.2)	12.8 (−10.7)	19.8 (−6.8)	28.5 (−1.9)	37.6 (3.1)	47.7 (8.7)	46.0 (7.8)	31.9 (−0.1)	18.8 (−7.3)	5.9 (−14.5)	−5.7 (−20.9)	−11.1 (−23.9)
Record low °F (°C)	−28 (−33)	−31 (−35)	−8 (−22)	7 (−14)	20 (−7)	25 (−4)	32 (0)	33 (1)	20 (−7)	−3 (−19)	−11 (−24)	−28 (−33)	−31 (−35)
Average precipitation inches (mm)	0.43 (11)	0.44 (11)	0.56 (14)	0.70 (18)	0.84 (21)	0.50 (13)	0.49 (12)	0.57 (14)	0.58 (15)	0.61 (15)	0.33 (8.4)	0.37 (9.4)	6.42 (163)
Average snowfall inches (cm)	4.6 (12)	3.4 (8.6)	1.5 (3.8)	1.2 (3.0)	0.1 (0.25)	0.0 (0.0)	0.0 (0.0)	0.0 (0.0)	0.0 (0.0)	0.2 (0.51)	1.5 (3.8)	5.4 (14)	17.9 (45)
Average precipitation days (≥ 0.01 in)	3.2	4.1	4.2	5.4	5.7	2.8	4.5	4.1	3.6	3.9	3.4	3.4	48.3
Average snowy days (≥ 0.1 in)	1.4	1.3	0.8	0.5	0.0	0.0	0.0	0.0	0.0	0.2	0.7	1.7	6.6
Source: NOAA
