= Charles Preuss =

Surveyor and cartographer (1803–1854)

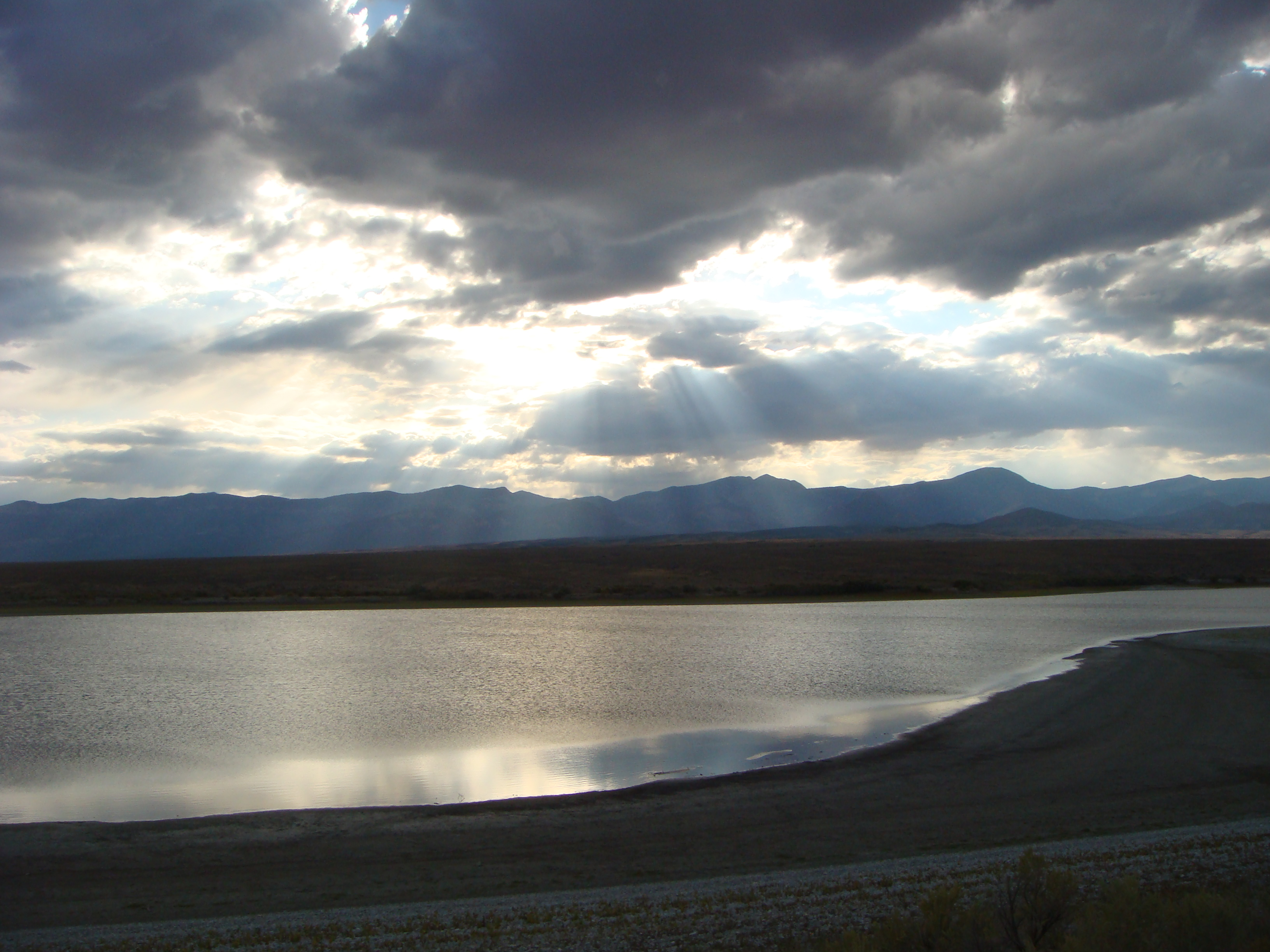
Pruess Lake, Snake Valley, Utah

George Karl Ludwig Preuss (1803–1854), anglicized as Charles Preuss, was a surveyor and cartographer who accompanied John C. Fremont on three of his five exploratory expeditions of the American west, including the expedition where he and Fremont were the first to record seeing Lake Tahoe from a mountaintop vantage point as they traversed what is now Carson Pass in February 1844. Preuss drew two important maps based on his records from Fremont's first two expeditions.

== Pre-Fremont ==
"Born in Höhscheid in 1803. After studying the science of geodesy, he became a surveyor for the Prussian government. After moving to the United States in 1834 with his wife and children, he worked for the Coast Survey under Ferdinand Rudolph Hassler."

== First Two Fremont Expeditions ==
Preuss and Frémont met in December 1841 when the unemployed Preuss approached Frémont to solicit work. The only work Fremont had at the time was to complete the interpretation of the astronomical observations taken during Fremont's last expedition with Joseph Nicollet. According to Fremont, he had to do most of the work for Preuss, but he still retained Preuss as a topographer on the expedition he was to embark on in the spring of 1842. That trip, from June to October 1842, resulted in an accurate survey and map of the Oregon Trail as far as South Pass.

Preuss again served as topographer on Frémont's second expedition to the west, from May 1843 to August 1844. After completing the survey of the Oregon Trail from South Pass to the Dalles of the Columbia River, they went south along the east side of the Cascade Mountains to Klamath Marsh, then on south to the Carson River, over the Sierra Nevada to Sutter's Fort (present Sacramento, California), south to Tehachapi Pass. They hit the Old Spanish Trail at present Victorville, California, then went northeast to Bent’s Fort on the Arkansas River, and returned to Westport, Missouri.

"Frémont's sensational report [of the 1843-44 expedition] included an excellent topographical map by Charles Preuss, The large sheet, which depicted the routes of both of Frémont's expeditions, was a cartographic milestone. By accurately representing the basic features of the new country, Preuss changed the course of western mapmaking. No longer would cartography be based on myth and speculation."

After completing this map, Preuss was engaged by Congress to create another map. He declined to accompany Fremont on his third expedition and in 1846, Preuss completed the second map, more important for prospective emigrants than the first. On seven sheets he carefully traced the Oregon Trail, using Frémont's narrative to indicate campsites with essential grass, wood, and water and to show distances, climate, and Indian inhabitants. Widely popular among those who took the Platte River road to Oregon and California, this annotated atlas was one of the greatest contributions Frémont and Preuss made to the development of the West."

Congress commissioned to Preuss create a third map in 1848, this time using information from records kept by Lt. Kern who was the topographer on Fremont's third expedition.

== Fourth Fremont Expedition and the Pacific Railroad Survey ==
In 1848 Preuss agreed to accompany Fremont on his fourth expedition, which ended in disaster with the death of 10 men and two more that tried to rescue the group that were caught high in the Rockies during the winter. The remaining men managed to find their way to safety in Albuquerque New Mexico, where word of discovery of gold in California made its way, and in the spring of 1849, Fremont and Preuss proceeded to California, and Preuss worked for Fremont surveying Fremont's Mariposa Land Grant. His health failed him; the cause attributed to heatstroke, and he returned east where he assisted in the preparation of two maps of the 1849-50 Stansbury expedition.

In 1853, Preuss was engaged by Lt. Robert S. Williamson as the draughtsman on the San Francisco to Southern California half of the Pacific Coast portion of the Pacific Railroad Surveys. The expedition sailed from New York City and landed in San Francisco in June, 1853. They surveyed south through the Tulare Lake area, Greenhorn Mountains, and Tehachapi Pass to the Mohave Desert, and finished in San Diego in December 1853. Preuss's again experienced health issues during the survey, but he managed to complete a map of the expedition.

Preuss hanged himself in 1854 after a series of depressive episodes. According to a biographer of John Fremont, Preuss most likely suffered from post-traumatic stress disorder. Furthermore, research on the Pacific Railroad Surveys and associated political intrigues in Washington, DC, reveal the intense pressures that Preuss may have felt by 1854. The topographer became caught between his competing patrons: War Secretary Jefferson Davis, on one hand, and Fremont and Thomas Hart Benton, on the other, as the two sides fought to secure their preferred railroad route through the mountains of Southern California.

== Commemorations ==
Pruess Lake (sic), located south of Garrison in west-central Utah, is named after him.

His diary was published in 1958 after a century of being unknown. He wrote the diaries primary for his wife, but after his death, the diary was sent to his relatives in Germany. They were uncovered in 1954 and published four years later. The diary of the Fremont expedition was featured on a 2008 episode of This American Life. It contrasted Fremont's exuberance with Preuss' sober, often humorously melancholy opinions of the expedition.

The Army Geospatial Center has mounted a number of plaques commemorating famous topographic engineers. One plaque reads: "George Karl (Charles) Ludwig Preuss, "Fremont’s Cartographer", 1803–1854. Charles Preuss was born in Hohsheid (Prussia, now Germany) in 1803. After studying the science of geodesy, he became a surveyor for the Prussian government. After moving to the United States he worked for the United States Coast Survey under Ferdinand Rudolph Hassler. In 1838, when funds for this Survey ran out, Preuss found himself unemployed. Hassler recommended Preuss to John Charles Fremont, a young 2nd lieutenant who was preparing an expedition exploring the lands between the Mississippi and Missouri Rivers. Preuss was hired on to reduce astronomical observations from this 1839 Nicollet survey. Preuss failed at this but proved himself a fine artist; keeping a daily map of the route. In 1842 Fremont was preparing an expedition out of St. Louis to map the Pacific Northwest and kept Preuss employed. Preuss was 39 by this time, red-faced and ill-humored. They were a badly matched pair, but Preuss played perfect counterpoint to Fremont. If Fremont saw the poetry in the unfolding landscapes around him, Preuss saw precise longitudes and latitudes. Preuss proved to be an important member of Fremont's expeditions of 1842–44 and 1848 as well. The Fremont/Preuss maps of this period were the basis for all western maps of the following two decades. One author writing on the mapping of the Transmississippi West said, “The 1845 Fremont/Preuss map changed the entire picture of the West, and made a lasting contribution to cartography.”

== Publications ==
- (1837) Preuss, Charles, and F. R. Hassler. Red Hook, Northside of Long Island Surveyed in the Summer of 1837. Washington, D.C.: U.S. Coast Survey, 1837. <. "Survey of the U.S. coast, F.R. Hassler, Superintendent"
- (1837) Preuss, Charles, and F. R. Hassler. River Woods, Northside of Long Island Surveyed in the Summer of 1837. Washington, D.C.: U.S. Coast Survey, 1837. <. "Survey of the U.S. coast, F.R. Hassler, Superintendent"
- (1845) Frémont, John Charles, John James Abert, and Charles Preuss. Map of an Exploring Expedition to the Rocky Mountains in the Year 1842 and to Oregon & North California in the Years 1843–44. Report of the Exploring Expedition to the Rocky Mountains in the Year 1842 and to Oregon and North California in the Years 1843–44. Washington, D.C.: U.S. House, 1845. Notes: Relief shown by hachures. House issue; lacks the astronomical observations that appear in the 1st issue by the Senate. Includes notes, Great Basin statement, and place name South Park below Bayou Salade; some place names differ from other states. Includes "Profile of the route from the mouth of the Kansas to the Pacific by Capt. J.C. Fremont in 1843." Scanned raster image of original: 1 map on 2 sheets : hand col.; 76 x 130 cm. David Rumsey Collection (Pub. list no. 1833.000). Responsibility: by Brevet Capt. J.C. Frémont of the Corps of Topographical Engineers under the orders of Col. J.J. Abert, Chief of the Topographical Bureau; lith. by E. Weber Co., Baltimore, Md.; [Charles Preuss, cartographer].
- (1846) Preuss, Charles, and John Charles Frémont. Topographical Map of the Road from Missouri to Oregon, Commencing at the Mouth of the Kansas in the Missouri River and Ending at the Mouth of the Wallah Wallah in the Columbia. Baltimore: Lithogr. by E. Weber & Co, 1846. An atlas prepared from the field notes and journal of Capt. J.C. Frémont, and from sketches and notes made on the ground by his assistant Charles Preuss; compiled by Charles Preuss, 1846 by order of the Senate of the United States.
- (1848) Frémont, John Charles, and Charles Preuss. Map of Oregon and Upper California from the Surveys of John Charles Fremont and Other Authorities. [Washington]: U.S. Army, Corps of Engineers, 1975. Description: 1 map; 85 x 68 cm. Other Titles: Oregon and upper California from the surveys of John Charles Frémont. Responsibility: drawn by Charles Preuss under the order of the Senate of the United States, Washington City, 1848; lithy. by E. Weber & Co., Balto.
- (1850) Stansbury, Howard, and Gunnison, J. W. (John Williams), 1812–1853; Preuss, Charles, 1803–1854; United States. Army. Corps Engineers. Map of the Great Salt Lake and Adjacent Country in the Territory of Utah. Digitized by: J. Willard Marriott Library, University of Utah, n.d. <>. Abstract: Date original: 1850 Scale of facsimile 1:360,000. Original publisher: Crockett & Richardson Historical Maps, 1986.
- (1850) United States, Howard Stansbury, J. W. Gunnison, and Charles Preuss. Map of a Reconnoissance between Fort Leavenworth on the Missouri River and the Great Salt Lake in the Territory of Utah, Made in 1849 and 1850 Under the Orders of Col. J.J. Abert. New York: Ackerman lith, 1850. Description: 1 map: hand col.; 71 x 174 cm. Responsibility: by Capt. Howard Stansbury aided by Lieut. J.W. Gunnison ... and Albert Carrington; drawn by Lieut. Gunnison and Charles Preuss.
- (1855) Preuss, Charles, R. S. Williamson, John G. Parke, and Issac Williams Smith. General Map of a Survey in California: In Connection with Examinations for Railroad Routes to the Pacific Ocean. 1855. Relief shown by hachures. "Proof revised in Office of P.R.R. Surveys Feb. 10th 1855. All copies printed prior to this date contain errors. G.K. Warren, Lt. Topl. Engrs." Description derived from published bibliography. Description: 1 map; 62 x 183 cm. Responsibility: made by order of the War Department by Lieut. R.S. Williamson, U.S. Topl. Engrs; assisted by J.G. Parke, U.S. Topl. Engrs. and Mr. Isaac Williams Smith, C.E. Abstract: Map shows "practicable railway routes" between Ft. Yuma on the Colorado River and the San Francisco Bay region.
- Frémont, John Charles, Bob Graham, Charles Preuss, and Kit Carson. The Crossing of the Sierra Nevada in the Winter of 1843–44: Report of the Exploring Expedition to Oregon and North California in the Years 1843–'44. Sacramento, Ca: B. Graham, 2001. J.C. Frémont; edited from United States Senate document no. 174 by Bob Graham. Cover title: "To which is added excerpts from the diary of Charles Preuss, the autobiography of Kit Carson, and annotations by the editor."
- Preuss, Charles. Exploring with Frémont: The Private Diaries of Charles Preuss, Cartographer for John C. Frémont on His First, Second, and Fourth Expeditions to the Far West. Norman: University of Oklahoma Press, 1958. 162 pages. First expedition, June 4, 1842 – October 2, 1842 : from Chouteau's Landing to the Wind River Mountains and return—Second expedition, May 30, 1843 – July 15, 1844 : from Chouteau's Landing to the far west and return—Fourth expedition, December 15, 1848 – February 12, 1849: from Chouteau's Landing to the Sangre de Cristo Mountains, thence to Taos, New Mexico. Series Title: American exploration and travel series, no. 26.
- Preuss, Charles, F. R. Hassler, and William Preuss. Charles Preuss Diaries and Related Materials. 1838. Description: Letters from Preuss to F.R. Hassler, 1838–1842; and prints of typed transcript : 2 folders in 1 portfolio. Diaries, 1842–1849; and typed transcripts: 1 microfilm reel: negative (Rich. 118:18) and positive. Abstract: Diaries in German, kept on John Charles Frémont's Western expeditions of 1842, 1843–1844, and 1848–1849. The Bancroft Library also has supplementary material used by Erwin G. and Elisabeth K. Gudde in editing the diaries for publication in 1958. Includes typed transcript (by Judge and Mrs. William Pruess) in the Library of Congress and prints of typed transcript ... with corrections by Erwin G. and Elisabeth K. Gudde. With this: Negative photostats of (3) letters from Preuss to F.R. Hassler, 1838–1842.
