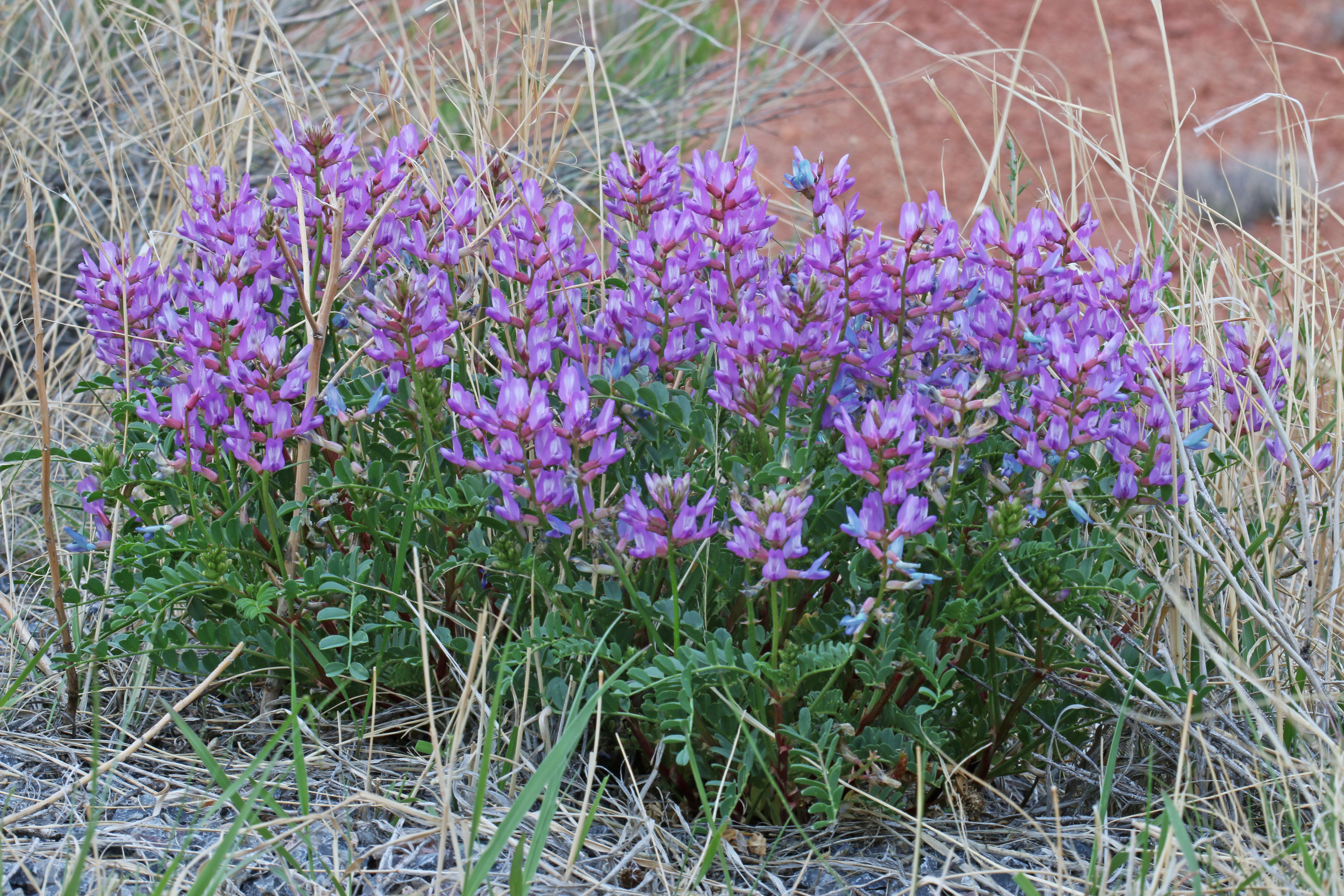

Conservation status
- Apparently Secure (NatureServe)

Scientific classification
- Kingdom: Plantae
- Clade: Tracheophytes
- Clade: Angiosperms
- Clade: Eudicots
- Clade: Rosids
- Order: Fabales
- Family: Fabaceae
- Subfamily: Faboideae
- Genus: Astragalus
- Species: A. preussii

Binomial name
- Astragalus preussii A.Gray

= Astragalus preussii =

Species of legume

Astragalus preussii (common name - Preuss’ milkvetch) is an annual or perennial plant in the legume family (Fabaceae) found in the Colorado Plateau and Canyonlands region of the southwestern United States.

== Description ==
=== Growth pattern ===
It is an annual or perennial plant from 4 to 15 inches (10 to 38 cm) tall, growing upright from a woody base.

=== Leaves and stems ===
It has compound pinnate leaves from 1 1/2 to 15 inches (3.8 to 38.1 cm) long, with 7-25 3/4 inch (1.9 cm), elliptic leaflets.

=== Inflorescence and fruit ===
It blooms from March to June. The inflorescence has 3-22 flowers per stalk, with a small, green, 5-lobed calyx around a tubular set of white to pink to purple petals, 3/4 inch (1.9 cm) long. When dried, 3/4 inch (1.9 cm) seed pods are papery or leathery, elliptical, and are either smooth or covered with soft hairs.

== Habitat and range ==
It only grows in soils containing Selenium.

== Ecological and human interactions ==
It is named after Charles Preuss.
