= Haystack Peak =

Mountain in Utah, United States

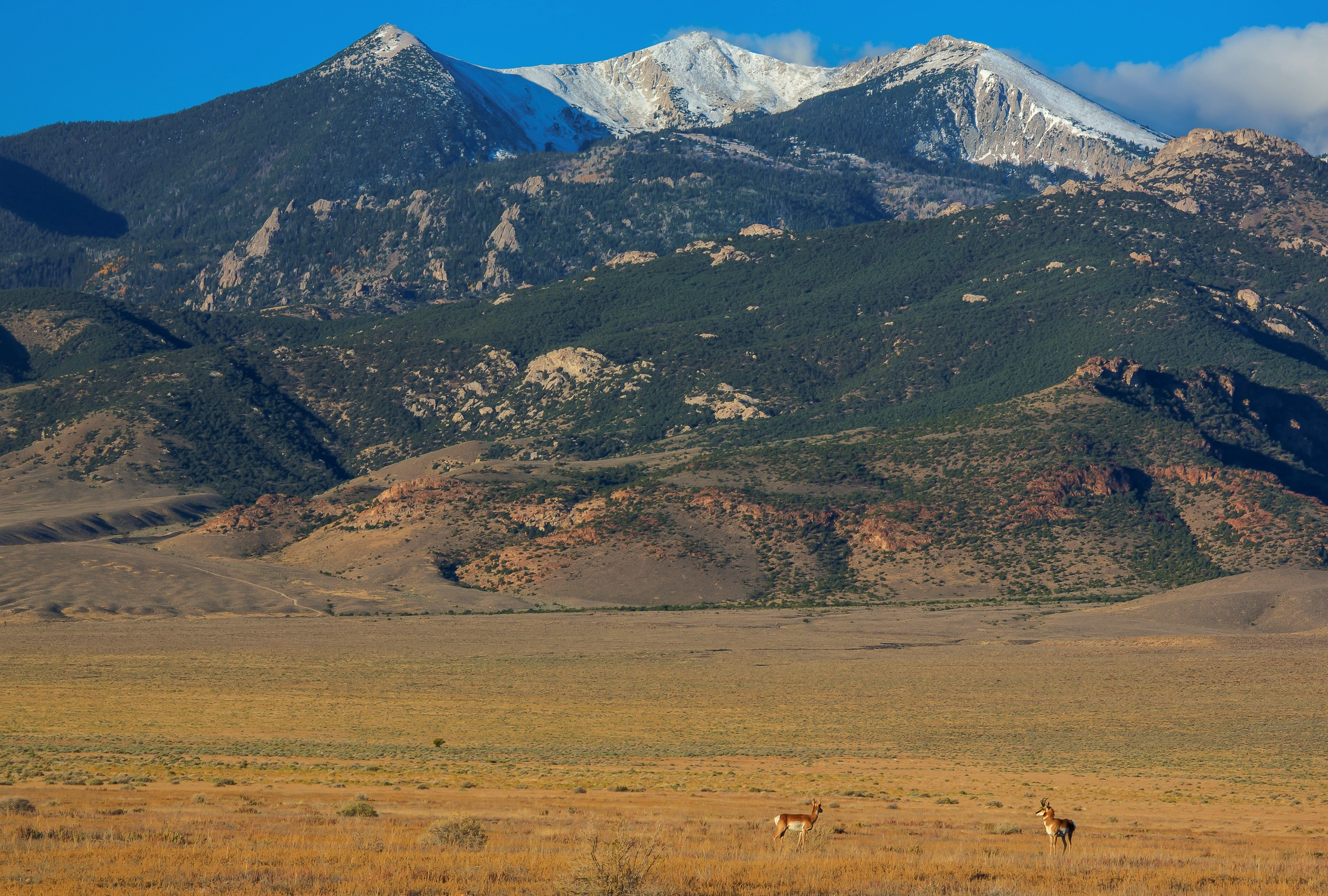
- Northeast aspect

Highest point
- Elevation: 12,020 ft (3,664 m)
- Prominence: 660 ft (201 m)
- Parent peak: Ibapah Peak (12,087 ft)
- Isolation: 1.58 mi (2.54 km)
- Coordinates: 39°50′52″N 113°54′18″W

Geography
- Location within Utah Location within the United States
- Location: Great Basin Desert
- Country: United States of America
- State: Utah
- County: Juab
- Parent range: Deep Creek Range; Great Basin Ranges
- Topo map: USGS Ibapah Peak

Geology
- Mountain type: Fault block
- Rock type: Granite

Climbing
- Easiest route: class 2 via Indian Farm Canyon

Haystack Peak is a 12,020-foot elevation (3,664 m) mountain summit located in Juab County, Utah, United States.

== Description ==
Haystack Peak is the second-highest summit in the Deep Creek Mountains which are a subset of the Great Basin Ranges, and it is set on land administered by the Bureau of Land Management. The Dugway Proving Ground is northeast of the peak and line parent Ibapah Peak is 1.5 mile to the southwest. Topographic relief is significant as the east aspect rises 6,800 feet (2,100 meters) in six miles, and the west aspect rises over 4,000 feet (1,200 meters) in two miles. Bristlecone pine can be found on the peak's slopes, as well as spruce, fir, and aspen. Precipitation runoff from the mountain's west slope drains into Sams Creek, the northwest slope drains into Indian Farm Creek, and the south slope is drained by Red Cedar Creek. This landform's toponym was officially adopted in 1974 by the U.S. Board on Geographic Names.

== Climate ==
Haystack Peak is set in the Great Basin Desert which has hot summers and cold winters. The desert is an example of a cold desert climate as the desert's elevation makes temperatures cooler than lower elevation deserts. Due to the high elevation and aridity, temperatures drop sharply after sunset. Summer nights are comfortably cool. Winter highs are generally above freezing, and winter nights are bitterly cold, with temperatures often dropping well below freezing. Alpine climate characterizes the summit and highest slopes.

Climate data for Haystack Peak 39.8473 N, 113.9090 W, Elevation: 11,398 ft (3,474 m) (1991–2020 normals)
Month	Jan	Feb	Mar	Apr	May	Jun	Jul	Aug	Sep	Oct	Nov	Dec	Year
Mean daily maximum °F (°C)	26.2 (−3.2)	25.7 (−3.5)	30.8 (−0.7)	35.1 (1.7)	44.6 (7.0)	56.5 (13.6)	65.9 (18.8)	64.4 (18.0)	55.9 (13.3)	43.5 (6.4)	32.3 (0.2)	25.9 (−3.4)	42.2 (5.7)
Daily mean °F (°C)	17.3 (−8.2)	16.0 (−8.9)	20.2 (−6.6)	24.2 (−4.3)	33.1 (0.6)	44.0 (6.7)	52.9 (11.6)	51.7 (10.9)	43.5 (6.4)	32.5 (0.3)	23.0 (−5.0)	17.0 (−8.3)	31.3 (−0.4)
Mean daily minimum °F (°C)	8.3 (−13.2)	6.2 (−14.3)	9.5 (−12.5)	13.2 (−10.4)	21.7 (−5.7)	31.5 (−0.3)	39.9 (4.4)	39.0 (3.9)	31.1 (−0.5)	21.6 (−5.8)	13.8 (−10.1)	8.1 (−13.3)	20.3 (−6.5)
Average precipitation inches (mm)	3.81 (97)	3.95 (100)	4.01 (102)	4.45 (113)	3.60 (91)	1.69 (43)	1.53 (39)	1.49 (38)	1.83 (46)	2.61 (66)	2.69 (68)	3.46 (88)	35.12 (891)
Source: PRISM Climate Group

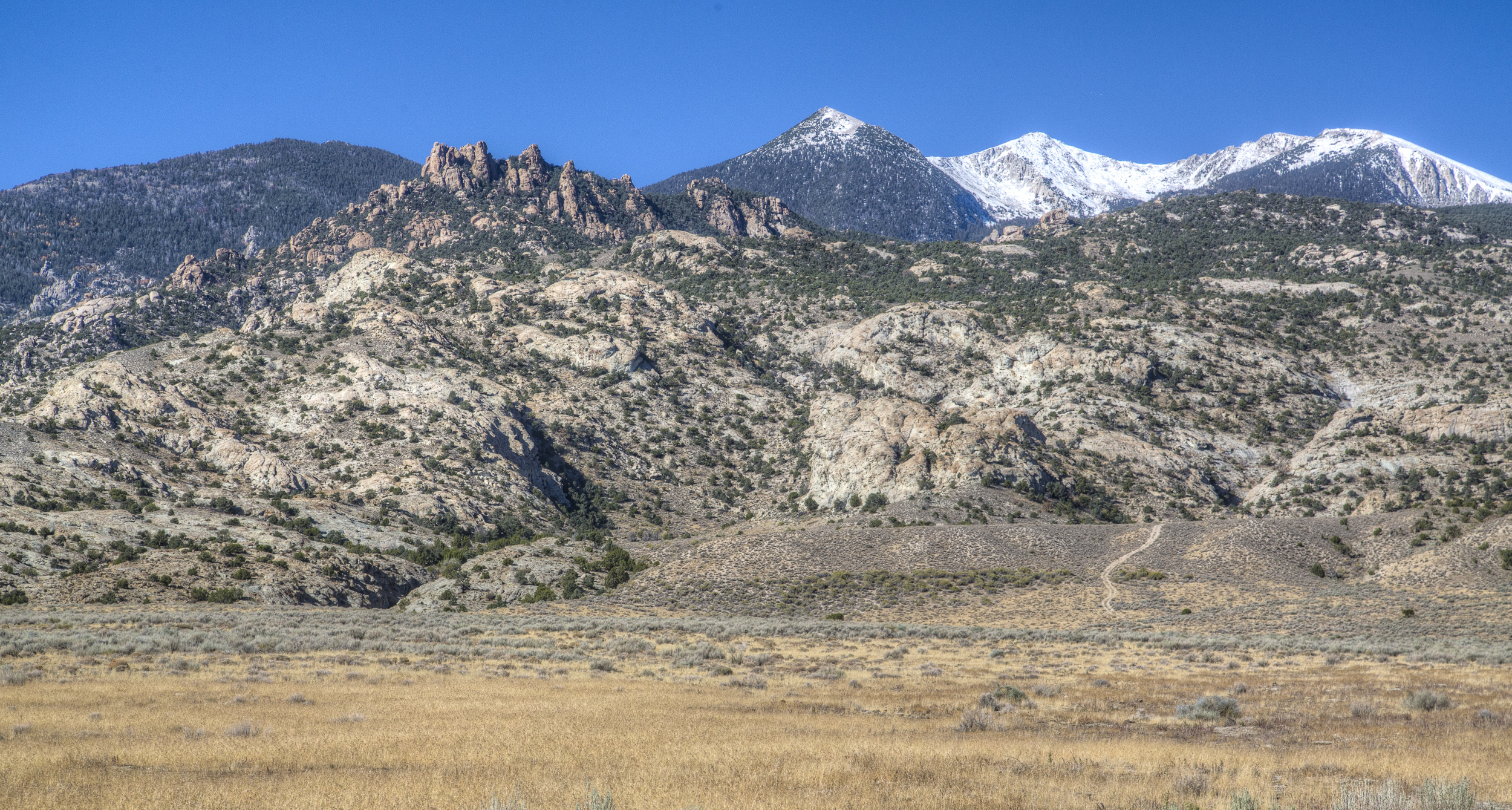
Snow-capped Haystack Peak

== See also ==
- List of mountain peaks of Utah
