= Trout Creek, Utah =

Unincorporated community in Utah, United States

- Unincorporated community
- Location within Utah Location within the United States
- Coordinates: 39°48′7.8″N 113°49′38.24″W
- Country: United States
- State: Utah
- County: Juab
- Named for: Trout Creek
- Elevation: 4,701 ft (1,433 m)
- Time zone: UTC-7 (Mountain (MST))
  - Summer (DST): UTC-6 (MDT)
- ZIP code: 84083
- Area code: 435
- GNIS feature ID: 1437707

Trout Creek is an unincorporated community, in far western Juab County, Utah, United States.

== Description ==
Historical population
Census	Pop.	Note	%±
1930	63		—
1940	23		−63.5%
Source: U.S. Census Bureau

The community is located along the Pony Express/Overland route in northern Snake Valley, north of Partoun and south of Callao. It is named after the creek that flows from the west off of the Deep Creek Mountains. The West Desert High School of the Tintic School District (the smallest secondary school in the state) is located within the community and it has one of the most remote LDS Church chapels in Utah (with a short section of paved road, the only paved road for over 50 miles [80 km]).

It is located at 39°48′7.8″N 113°49′38.24″W, at an elevation of 6,675 feet (2,035 m). The Zip Code is 84083.
