= Tintic High School =

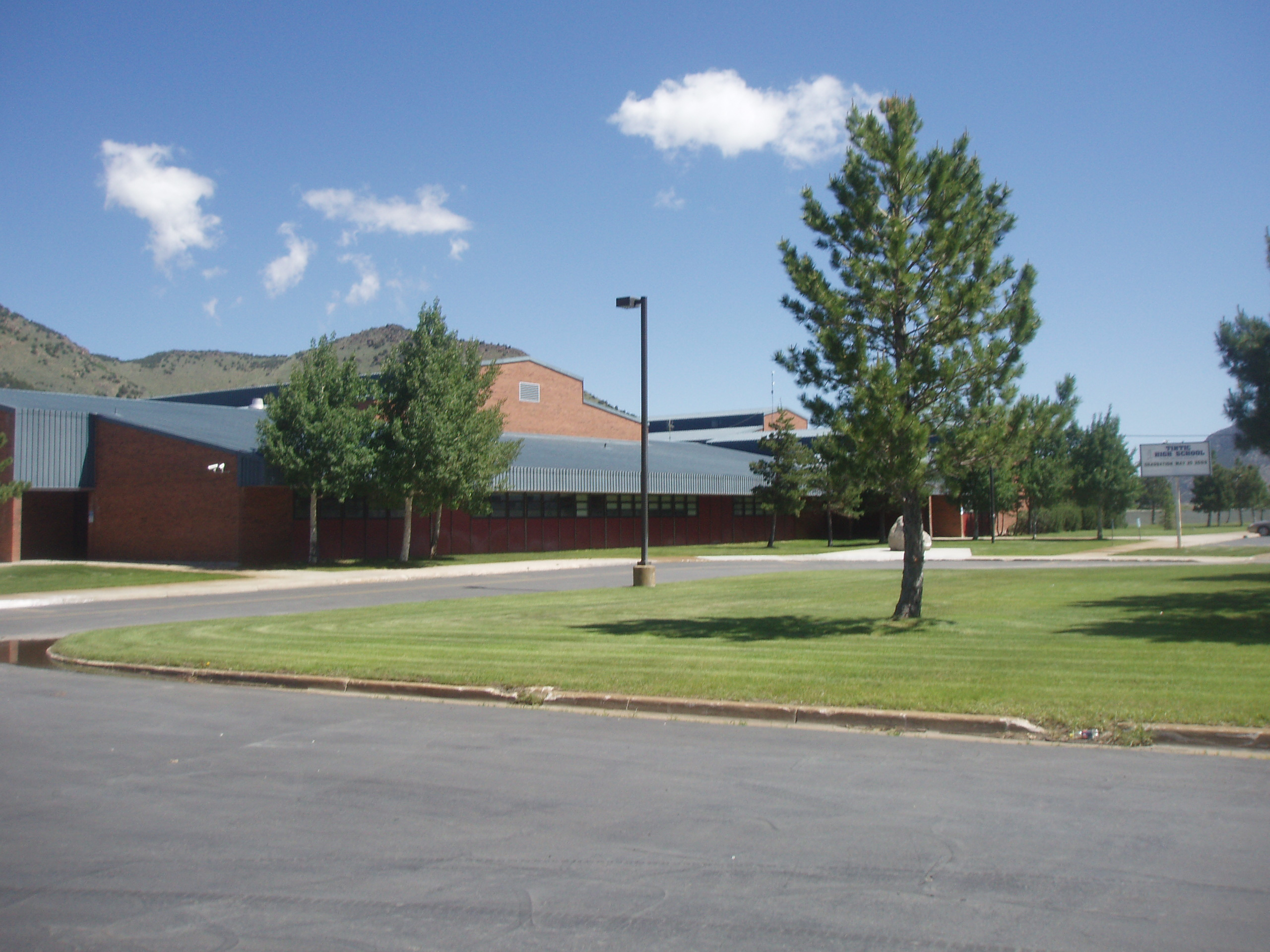
- View of Tintic High School from the parking lot, June 2009

Location
- 525 East Main Street; Eureka, Utah 84628; United States; 39°57′33″N 112°06′17″W

Information
- Type: Secondary public school
- Motto: I'm proud to be a Miner
- School district: Tintic School District
- NCES District ID: 490102000560
- CEEB code: 450095
- Principal: Greg Thornock
- Principal: Karen Kramer
- Staff: 5
- Faculty: 11
- Grades: 7 to 12
- Gender: Coed
- Enrollment: 139 (2023-2024)
- Campus type: Rural
- Colors: White and blue
- Athletics: Yes
- Athletics conference: Utah High School Activities Association (UHSAA)
- Team name: Miners
- Yearbook: Pick and Shovel
- Communities served: Eureka, Mammoth, & Vernon
- Feeder schools: Eureka Elementary School
- Website: www.tintic.org/o/ths

Tintic High School is a small rural public high school in Eureka, Utah, United States.

== Description ==
Tintic High School is one of two high schools in the Tintic School District. There are approximately 145 students in grades 7‑12. Although the Tintic School District is in Juab County (one of two), some of its students reside in Vernon (in southern Tooele County) and in southern Utah County.

The faculty consists of 11 teachers and two principals, as well as 5 support staff. There is a special education program as well as vocational, technology, home economics, and core curriculum programs.

The school is classified as a 1A school by the Utah High School Activities Association. They participate in girls' volleyball, basketball, track, cross country, golf and cheer. They also participate in boys' baseball, basketball, wrestling, track, cross country and golf. There are also activities in music with a pep, jazz, concert, and marching band. They also have a drama class which participated in region in 2007–2008.

Some of the teachers at Tintic graduated from the school themselves. A mentoring program is in place for new teachers. The components of the mentoring program cover the following items: daily schedule, lesson plans, activities, student discipline, and school traditions.

== Sports ==
In 2012, as with most 1A schools in the region regardless of win/loss record, Tintic High School's sports teams made it to state. The boys' basketball team had a win and took first in region.

Region 21 boys basketball champions in the 2021-22 season.

== Band ==
Tintic High School is the only 1A school in Utah to have a marching band. On July 4, 2007, they participated in an Independence Day parade in Murray. The band also plays pep, jazz, and concert music. In 2007 they competed for region concert and region jazz. They won both competitions.

The band also played in the Little America hotel in Salt Lake City for the Utah School Board's convention. During the spring of 2008 the THS band performed at Disneyland. In May 2010 they performed in San Diego, California.

In 2012 the band received a rating of superior in both region and state. This was the first time this happened in the school's history. They also traveled to San Francisco and won a superior rating in that competition.

== See also ==
- List of high schools in Utah
