= House of Aaron =

American religious sect

- House of Aaron logo
- Classification: Christian
- Leader: John M. Conrad
- Headquarters: Eskdale, Utah; 39°6′27.61″N 113°57′10.87″W
- Founder: Maurice L. Glendenning
- Origin: August 18, 1943; Utah
- Separated from: The Church of Jesus Christ of Latter-day Saints
- Members: Between 1,500 and 2,000
- Official website: House of Aaron website

The House of Aaron, less commonly known as the Aaronic Order or The Order of Aaron, is an American religious sect that believes they are descendants of Aaron and believe in the Aaronic writings. The sect is centered in Eskdale, Utah, a small farming community in Millard County, with additional branches in Partoun and Murray, Utah. The House of Aaron was founded in 1943 by Maurice L. Glendenning and has an estimated membership between 1,500 and 2,000.

== Background ==
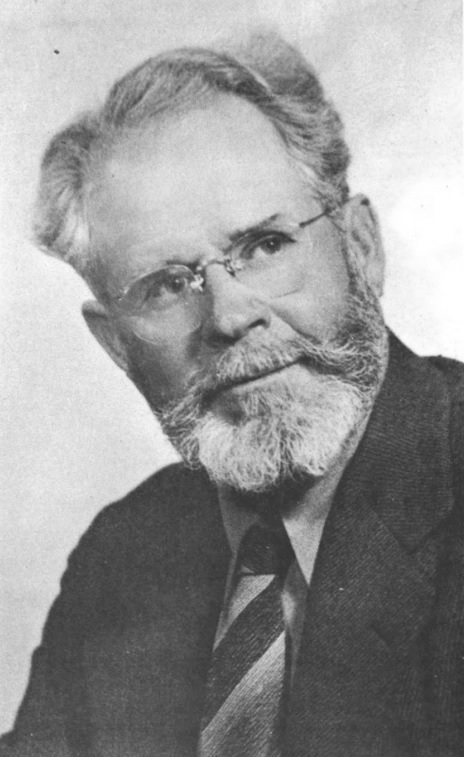
Maurice L. Glendenning, founder of the House of Aaron

Glendenning was born 15 February 1891 in Randolph, Kansas. He and his family were unfamiliar with the Latter Day Saint movement and the Church of Jesus Christ of Latter-day Saints (LDS Church). However, as a boy, he confided in his father that he could "hear heavenly music even when wide-awake". As a young teen, the heavenly music became interspersed with angelic voices uttering poetry, which he began to write down in notes he kept private out of fear of ridicule. As a young man, the "angelic poetry" evolved into doctrinal and philosophical statements, and he gradually began sharing the text of his messages with more and more friends and relatives.

In 1928, Glendenning and his family moved to Provo, Utah, looking for employment. Counseled by LDS missionaries, Glendenning began to feel that a number of LDS doctrines, including the priesthood and proper authority, helped him understand his experiences and writings. Glendenning and his wife were baptized into the LDS Church on August 14, 1929.

On January 15, 1945, he was excommunicated as the "Instigator of the Aaronic Order". LDS Church General Authorities asserted that Glendenning was an apostate or heretic. While LDS members could receive divine inspiration for themselves, no one could receive authentic divine messages for the church as a whole, except the President of the Church. However, Glendenning claims not to have received divine messages for the LDS church as a whole; rather, he was accused of wrongdoing presumably because he had claimed to receive divine inspiration that, if true, would affect the validity of some of the teachings of the LDS Church.

Glendenning died October 5, 1969, in Utah.

== Sect classification ==
The House of Aaron does not consider itself to be part of the Latter Day Saint movement. However, religious researchers have categorized it as part of the Latter Day Saint movement, due to Glendenning's membership and excommunication from the LDS Church, the LDS roots of most of its founding members, the similarities between Glendenning's claims and those of Mormonism's founder Joseph Smith, and the Utah location of its commune and branches.

== Current ministry and beliefs ==
Aaronic Order emblem for military headstones

The House of Aaron ministry is currently under the leadership of John M. Conrad, who states, "Our passion and mission is to assist in the gathering of Israel into a Holy Nation with Yeshua as King and the Torah (Word) as its constitution. Our focus is on Yeshua (Jesus)." The House of Aaron website states its mission is "to participate in and hasten the preparation of the Body of Jesus Christ for His second coming." Its vision is to "restore the Biblical, Levitical ministry to its prophesied fullness in Jesus Christ and to reconcile individuals, families, and fellowships to their places in the Body of Christ."

The following statement comes from the official House of Aaron website:

The House of Aaron is the Biblical name of the family of Israelite priests ordained by God to serve Him at the Tabernacle in the wilderness and, later, at the temple in Jerusalem. Aaronites were a family within the tribe of Levi. This entire tribe was called by God to minister to him and then to the people. The specific duties of the Levites were to assist Aaron in the work of the Tabernacle, in teaching, ministering in music and judging all the tribes of Israel. God made clear that Levi was to have no inheritance in the land but Him. (Deuteronomy 18:1–2) Thus, no territory was identified as Levi and Aaron's home. Instead, 48 Levitical cities were scattered about the land, some in each tribe to remind Levi that his ministry extended to all the tribes of Israel.

=== Scripture ===
The House of Aaron considers its beliefs to be strictly Biblical and part of the broader messianic movement united under the Alliance of Redeemed Israel (ARI). Its basic beliefs have never included the Book of Mormon, nor any other LDS scriptures.

In 1978 the Levitical Writings was published. This book was a compilation of 1944's Book of Elias, or the Record of John, 1948's New Revelations for the Book of Elias, or the Record of John, and 1955's Disciple Book.

Currently, House of Aaron says that the "Levitical Writings" is only mentioned and studied on occasion but is not used for doctrine. House of Aaron leader John Conrad states unequivocally that the Bible is "the undisputed basis of our doctrine and teaching."

The Aaronic Order teaches that Christ is seen as having a Heavenly Father, but also is to be thought of as the Father and that the Holy Ghost is the spirit of God and Jesus Christ resumed after his resurrection.

=== Priesthood ===
The Aaronic Order believes that members given the Aaronic Priesthood in the pre-mortal existence, and need not be ordained. Members therefore believe that they are Biblical leaders who were predestined to come to the earth and fulfill their responsibilities.

=== Communal settlement ===
In 1955 the church established a communal settlement called Eskdale, Utah, named after Eskdale, Scotland. Eskdale has become a small unincorporated farming area in Millard County, Utah, located just east of the Nevada border.

In its early years, Eskdale community was isolationist, and a uniform was worn: the men in blue slacks and shirts with "Aaron" embroidered in gold over the pocket; women in blue and white dresses with "Levi" embroidered on their small, white caps. However, over the past several decades, the community has slowly become an open, integral part of the local valley, and the dress code has been relaxed.

=== Sabbath ===
Since 1958 they have observed the Seventh Day Sabbath because of a revelation from Glendenning.

=== Plural marriage ===
In 2005, due to numerous publications which claimed the House of Aaron practiced plural marriage, the House of Aaron was included in the Utah Attorney General's Office and the Arizona Attorney General's Office publication titled The Primer. It was included within the list of "Fundamentalist Groups" that are practitioners of plural marriage. However, in 2011 the House of Aaron was removed from the publication. The House of Aaron states that they have never believed in or practiced polygamy and House of Aaron leader John M. Conrad has described polygamy as "abhorrent and disgusting."

== General and cited references ==
- Baer, Hans A. (1988). Recreating Utopia in the Desert: A Sectarian Challenge to Modern Mormonism. Albany, NY: State University of New York Press. ISBN 088706681X.
- Beeston, Blanche W. (1957). Now My Servant: A Brief Biography of a Firstborn Son of Aaron. Caldwell, ID: Caxton Printers, Ltd. hdl:2027/wu.89067576777. ISBN 1258139103.
- Buchanan, Frederick S. (January–February 1979). "A Refuge in the Desert: Eskdale, Utah" (PDF). Sunstone. Salt Lake City, Utah: Sunstone Education Foundation: 33–36.
- Conrad, Robert. Basic Beliefs of the Aaronic Order. Murray, UT: The Aaronic Order.
- Glendenning, Maurice L. (1955). Church of the First-Born, The Church of Christ, The Church of Jesus Christ, The Church of God: A Treatise. Salt Lake City, UT: Corporation of the President of the Aaronic Order.
- Glendenning, Maurice L. (1978). Levitical Writings. Eskdale, Utah: The Aaronic Order.
- Wright, James G. (September 6, 1993). "To survive, children of Aaron coming of age: Isolationist sect finds it must let a little of the world seep into its commune to keep it alive". Los Angeles Times.
