= Utah State Route 257 =

State highway in Utah, United States

State Route 257

Route information
- Maintained by UDOT
- Length: 69.246 mi (111.441 km)
- Existed: 1955–present

Major junctions
- South end: SR-21 in Milford
- North end: US 6 / US 50 in Hinckley

Location
- Country: United States
- State: Utah

Highway system
- Utah State Highway System; Interstate; US; State; Minor; Scenic
← SR-256	→ SR-258

State Route 257 is a highway in central Utah that runs from the junction of SR-21 in Milford to US-6/US-50 sixty-nine miles (111 kilometers) to the north in Hinckley. There are no junctions with any other state highways along SR-257.

== Route description ==
From its southern terminus in Beaver County, SR-257 generally north until Black Rock, where it makes a turn to the northwest. It stays north-northwest until the northern terminus of the route, located in Millard County. Most of the route is paralleled by Lynndyl Subdivision of the Union Pacific Railroad.

== History ==
The northernmost piece of SR-257 became a state highway in 1933 as part of State Route 140, a short connection from SR-27 (now US-6) near Hinckley south to Deseret and east via Oasis to SR-26 (now US-50) at Harding. The remainder was not created until 1955, when the state legislature added the road between SR-21 in Milford and SR-140 at Deseret to the state highway system as SR-257. A short loop through downtown Hinckley, heading west from SR-140 on 2500 South and north on Main Street to SR-27, was added as State Route 240 in 1966 but dropped from the state highway system in 1969. With the deletion of SR-140 in 1969, SR-257 assumed its current extent, replacing the north–south piece of SR-140.

== Major intersections ==
County	Location	mi	km	Destinations	Notes
Beaver	Milford	0.000	0.000	SR-21 (Center Street)	Southern terminus
Millard	Hinckley	69.246	111.441	US 6 / US 50 – Hinckley, Delta	Northern terminus
1.000 mi = 1.609 km; 1.000 km = 0.621 mi
