= Ibapah Peak (Juab County, Utah) =

Mountain in the Deep Creek Range in Juab County, Utah, United States

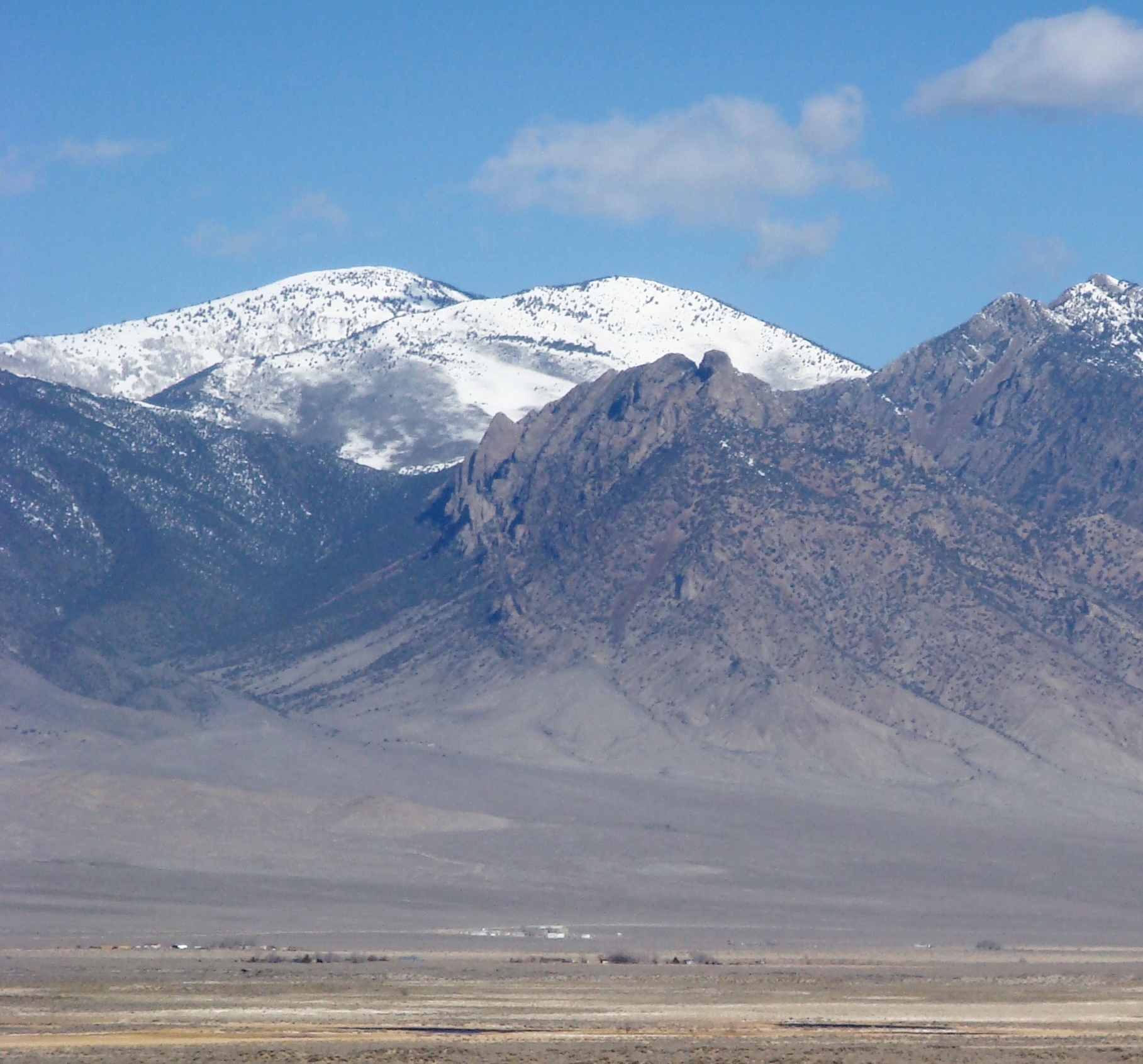

Highest point
- Elevation: 12,087 ft (3,684 m)
- Prominence: 5,247 ft (1,599 m)
- Parent peak: Doso Doyabi
- Isolation: 61.18 mi (98.46 km)
- Listing: Ultra
- Coordinates: 39°49′42″N 113°55′11″W

Geography
- Location within Utah
- Parent range: Deep Creek Range
- Topo map: USGS Ibapah Peak

Ibapah Peak is a 12,087-foot (3,684 m) summit in Juab County, Utah in the United States. It is the highest point of the Deep Creek Range and is located less than 5 miles (8.0 km) east of the Utah-Nevada border, and about 10 miles (16 km) northwest of the town of Trout Creek, Utah. With a topographic prominence of 5,247 feet (1,599 m) it is the eighth-most prominent summit in Utah.

== See also ==
- List of mountain peaks of Utah
- List of the most prominent summits of the United States
