= Utah State Route 153 =

State highway in Utah, United States

State Route 153
- Beaver Canyon Scenic Byway

Route information
- Maintained by UDOT
- Length: 40.488 mi (65.159 km)
- Existed: 1945–present
- Restrictions: Closed in winter from mile 22 to Junction

Major junctions
- West end: SR-160 in Beaver
- East end: US 89 in Junction

Location
- Country: United States
- State: Utah
- Counties: Beaver; Piute

Highway system
- Utah State Highway System; Interstate; US; State; Minor; Scenic
← SR-152	→ SR-154

State Route 153 (SR-153) is a state highway in the U.S. state of Utah. Just over half of the western portion of the highway has been designated the Beaver Canyon Scenic Byway as part of the Utah Scenic Byways and National Forest Scenic Byways programs.

== Route description ==
SR-153 starts in Beaver, Utah as a surface street named 200 North at its intersection with SR-160 (Main Street). After approximately 3 miles (4.8 km), it enters Beaver Canyon alongside Beaver River, and after another 1.5 miles (2.4 km), it enters Fishlake National Forest. Continuing up the canyon, the route passes Three Creeks Reservoir, Eagle Point Ski Resort, and Puffer's Lake as it climbs into the Tushar Mountains. In this area, the route reaches its highest paved elevation at 9,200 feet (2,800 m) (Utah's 5th highest paved road). Shortly after the Puffer's Lake turn-off, the pavement ends and the route reaches its highest overall elevation of over 10,200 feet (3,100 m).

After this peak, the route turns south for a few miles before resuming its general eastward direction. As it descends from the mountains, it follows City Creek down the canyon. Once out of the canyon, the route turns southeast towards the town of Junction, Utah in Piute County. As it enters the town, it turns due east to merge with Center Street until its eastern terminus at US-89 (Main Street).

== History ==
The road from Beaver east to Puffer's Lake was first added to the state highway system in 1927 as part of SR-21. In 1941, SR-21 was extended east from Beaver to SR-11 (US-89) at Junction. In 1945, the road from Beaver to Junction was split off from SR-21 and designated as SR-153, reusing the newly vacated route number (former SR-153 was absorbed by SR-68 that same year).

The highway's route has remained mostly unchanged since 1945, except for some minor realignments.

SR-153 was designated the Beaver Canyon Scenic Byway, a Utah Scenic Byway on April 6, 1990, and subsequently designated a National Forest Service Byway on February 6, 1991.

== Major intersections ==
County	Location	mi	km	Destinations	Notes
Beaver	Beaver	0.000	0.000	SR-160	Western terminus: Beginning of scenic byway
Beaver		21.294	34.269		End of scenic byway; Begin unpaved portion
Piute		34.815	56.029		Pavement resumes
Piute	Junction	40.488	65.159	US 89	Eastern terminus
1.000 mi = 1.609 km; 1.000 km = 0.621 mi

== See also ==
- List of state highways in Utah
- List of highways numbered 153
