= Pruess Lake =

Reservoir in the state of Utah, United States

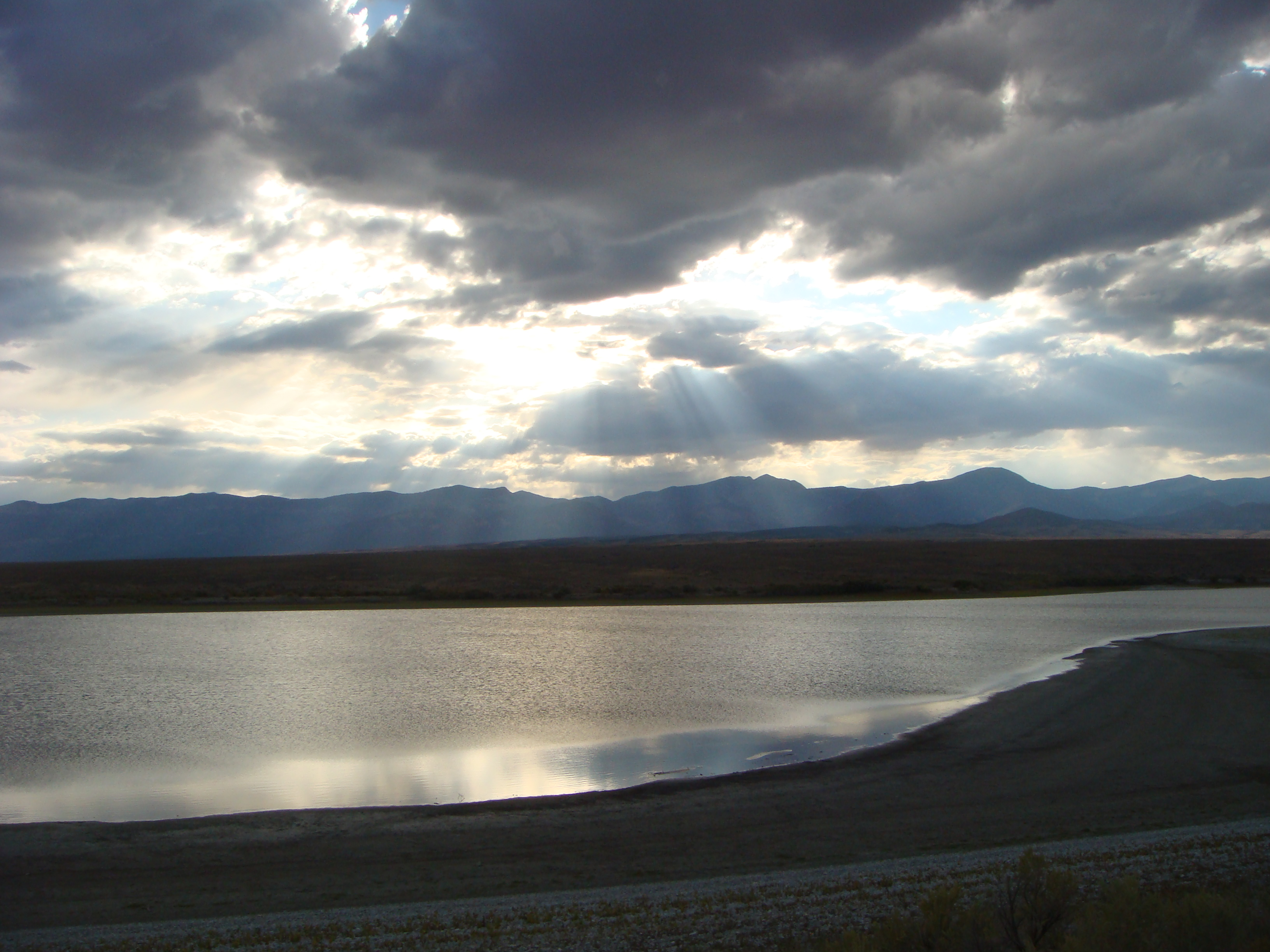
- Sunbeams over Pruess Lake, November 2009

- Location within Utah Location within the United States
- Location: Millard County, Utah, United States
- Coordinates: 38.8846460°N 114.0128633°W
- Basin countries: United States
- Surface area: 1 sq mi (2.6 km^{2})
- Surface elevation: 1,645 m (5,397 ft)

Pruess Lake is a small spring-fed lake in Snake Valley, Millard County, west-central Utah, United States. It is just south of Garrison and north of Burbank. It was named after Charles Preuss, a cartographer who was on John C. Fremont's first, second and fourth expeditions. Where or when the spelling error (Preuss vs Pruess) occurred is unknown, but all maps and official state naming documents mention the lake's name as Pruess. The area of the lake is about one square mile.

Several springs flow into the lake, including Big Springs in Nevada and Dearden Springs along Lake Creek, Nevada and Utah. The water in the lake and the creeks that flow into the lake are heavily used for agriculture, so the only spring that always flows into the lake is Clay Spring. The lake has also been modified to a reservoir by the Pruess Lake Dam for agricultural use.

The road that leads to Lexington Arch, part of Great Basin National Park, is just south of Pruess Lake. The lake is a popular local recreation spot for fishing and minor boating/floating.

Pruess Lake is a habitat for a bevy of wildlife. One of the most unusual is a mollusk called the California floater (Anodonta californiensis), a species left over from Lake Bonneville.

== See also ==
- List of lakes in Utah
