= Gandy, Utah =

Unincorporated community in the state of Utah, United States

- Unincorporated community
- Location of Gandy within the State of Utah Gandy (the United States)
- Coordinates: 39°27′00″N 113°58′59″W
- Country: United States
- State: Utah
- County: Millard
- Named after: Isaac Gandy
- Elevation: 4,951 ft (1,509 m)
- Time zone: UTC-7 (Mountain (MST))
  - Summer (DST): UTC-6 (MDT)
- ZIP codes: 84728
- Area code: 435
- GNIS feature ID: 1437769

Gandy is an unincorporated community in the northwestern corner of Millard County, Utah, United States, located just east of the Nevada-Utah state line.

Historical population
Census	Pop.	Note	%±
1900	89		—
1910	69		−22.5%
1920	79		14.5%
1930	65		−17.7%
1940	39		−40.0%
1950	48		23.1%
Source: U.S. Census Bureau

== Description ==
It is located in the west-central part of Snake Valley. It is known for Gandy Warm Springs and Gandy Creek, a large spring (15-19 cfs) that comes out of the base of Spring Mountain to the west. It stays around 81–82 degrees Fahrenheit (27–28 Celsius) year-round. Originally known as Smithville, Gandy was renamed in 1925 after Isaac Gandy, the first ranch owner in the area back when this was a post office stop along the Pony Express/Overland Route.
