= Deep Creek Mountains =

Mountain range in Utah, United States

Deep Creek Range
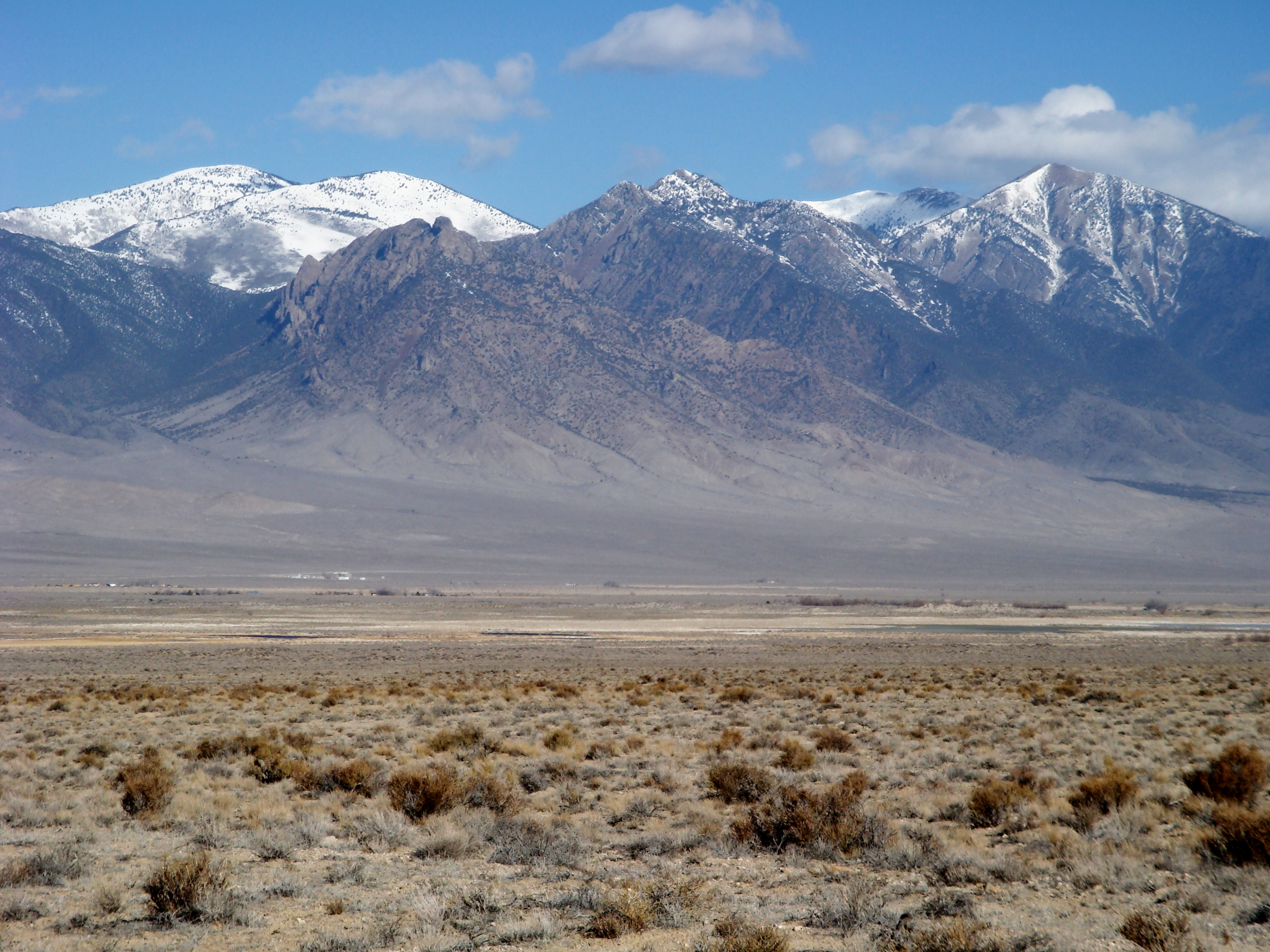
- Deep Creek Range covered in snow, March 2008

Highest point
- Peak: Ibapah Peak
- Elevation: 12,087 ft (3,684 m)

Geography
- Location within Utah
- Country: United States
- State: Utah
- Range coordinates: 39°50′42″N 113°54′40″W

Geology
- Rock type: granite

The Deep Creek Range, often referred to as the Deep Creek Mountains (Goshute: Pi'a-roi-ya-bi), are a mountain range in the Great Basin located in extreme western Tooele and Juab counties in Utah, United States. The range trends north–south (with a curl to the west at the southern end, 16% of range in White Pine County, Nevada), and is composed of granite in its central highest portion. The valley to the east is Snake Valley, and to the west is Deep Creek Valley. Nearby communities include Callao, Utah to the east and the community of Ibapah and the lands of the Confederated Tribes of the Goshute Reservation to the west.

The highest point in the Deep Creek Range is Ibapah Peak, an ultra prominent peak, which rises to 12,087 feet (3,684 m). Other peaks include Haystack Peak at 12,020 feet (3,660 m) and Red Mountain at 11,588 feet (3,532 m). The range is the source of several perennial streams and supports a diverse coniferous forest, with an "island" of alpine tundra on the highest summits. The range has a vertical relief of 7,800 feet (2,400 m) above the salt flats of the Great Salt Lake Desert lying to the northeast and rises about 6,000 feet (1,800 m) above the semiarid plains to the west.
