= Utah State Route 161 =

Highway in Utah, United States

State Route 161
- SR-161 in red

Route information
- Maintained by UDOT
- Length: 3.084 mi (4.963 km)
- Existed: 1965–present

Major junctions
- South end: I-70 near Cove Fort
- North end: I-15 near Cove Fort

Location
- Country: United States
- State: Utah
- Counties: Millard

Highway system
- Utah State Highway System; Interstate; US; State; Minor; Scenic
← SR-160	→ SR-162

State Route 161 (SR-161) is a 3.084-mile (4.963 km) long state highway, designated as a rural major connector, completely within Millard County in central Utah. The highway connects Interstate 70 (I-70) to I-15 while providing service to historic Cove Fort. The route was once part of U.S. Route 91 (US-91), but was renumbered to SR-161 in the 1970s, in parallel with the construction of I-70.

== Route description ==
Located entirely in southeastern Millard County, SR-161 starts at a diamond interchange with the westernmost exit on I-70 before it terminates at I-15. The road continues northward until it reaches the historic Cove Fort and the associated visitors center. On the eastern side of the highway is a Utah Department of Transportation (UDOT) maintenance center. SR-161 starts to make a gentle turn to the northeast, passing a filling station, which also serves as a rest area as part of a public–private partnership between UDOT and the owners of the station. The highway intersects I-15 and comes to an end at a cattle guard on Black Rock Road northwest of the interchange with I-15.

In 2007, a daily average of 455 cars traveled along SR-161, representing only a slight growth from previous years; in 2006, the average was 450 and in 2005, 415). Thirty five percent of this traffic was composed of trucks. The average traffic measurement is collected at a point on SR-161 between Cove Fort and the interchange with I-15.

== History ==
The SR-161 designation has been used two other times for other state routes. The first route, which was formed in 1933, connected US-50/US-89/US-91 (now US-89) to SR-68 in Bluffdale until the route was decommissioned in 1953. From May 8, 1961, to February 14, 1964, the route number was used for a road from US-91 to I-15 in the city of Beaver.

The parallel T-beam bridges that carry I-15 over SR-161 at its northern terminus were constructed in 1966 along with the construction of I-15 though the area. The bridges carrying I-70 over SR-161 were constructed in 1973.

The current route, codified into Utah law in 1965 and designated on signage following the decommissioning of US-91 in the 1970s, was partially a former alignment of US-91. Once I-70 was completed the 1.07 mi (1.72 km) long segment of US-91 as well as the roadway to the north was designated SR-161 by the Utah State Department of Highways. No significant changes have been made to the roadway except for its legal definition. SR-161 serves the important function of providing access to the contracted rest area as well as the historic Cove Fort. As of 2009 no new projects are scheduled for SR-161, either through the American Recovery and Reinvestment Act or the UDOT Statewide Transportation Improvement Program.

== Major intersections ==
The entire route is in Millard County.

Location	mi	km	Destinations	Notes
	0.000– 0.080	0.000– 0.129	I-70 to I-15 – Richfield	Exit 1 on I-70; southern terminus.
	2.812– 3.071	4.525– 4.942	I-15 – Cedar City, Salt Lake City	Exit 135 on I-15
	3.084	4.963	Black Rock Road Cattle guard	Northern terminus
1.000 mi = 1.609 km; 1.000 km = 0.621 mi
