= Burbank, Utah =

Unincorporated community in the state of Utah, United States

Burbank
- Unincorporated community
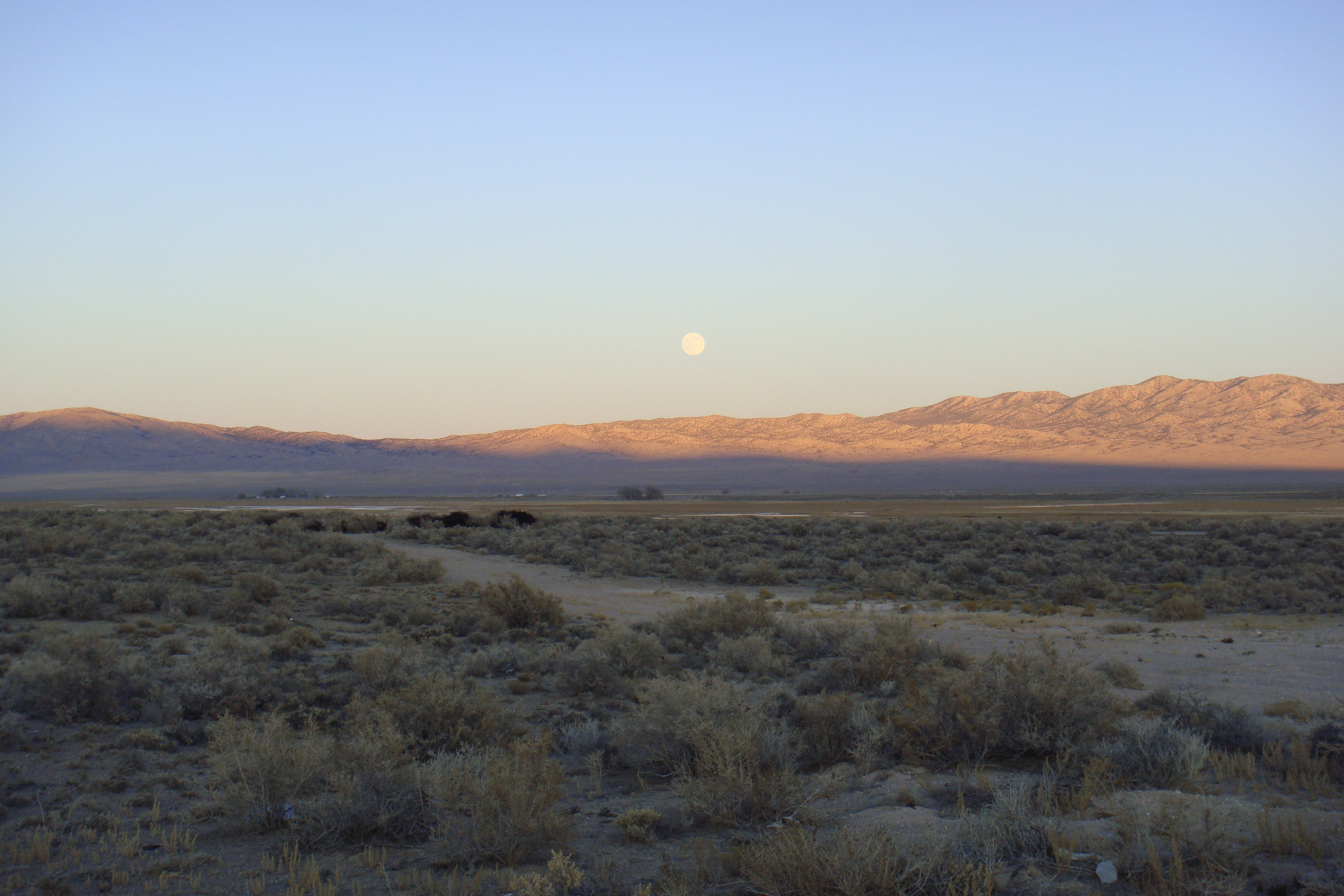
- Burbank and moon at sunset

- Location within Utah Location within the United States
- Coordinates: 38°46′45″N 114°02′35″W
- Country: United States
- State: Utah
- County: Millard
- Founded: 1870s
- Named for: Margie Burbank Clay
- Elevation: 5,427 ft (1,654 m)
- GNIS feature ID: 1450268

Burbank is a small farming unincorporated community located on the western edge of Millard County, Utah, United States, just east of the Nevada border. It is located in the southern part of Snake Valley, near the opening (northern border) of Hamlin Valley.

Historical population
Census	Pop.	Note	%±
1900	153		—
1910	41		−73.2%
1920	28		−31.7%
1930	37		32.1%
1940	27		−27.0%
1950	46		70.4%
Source: U.S. Census Bureau

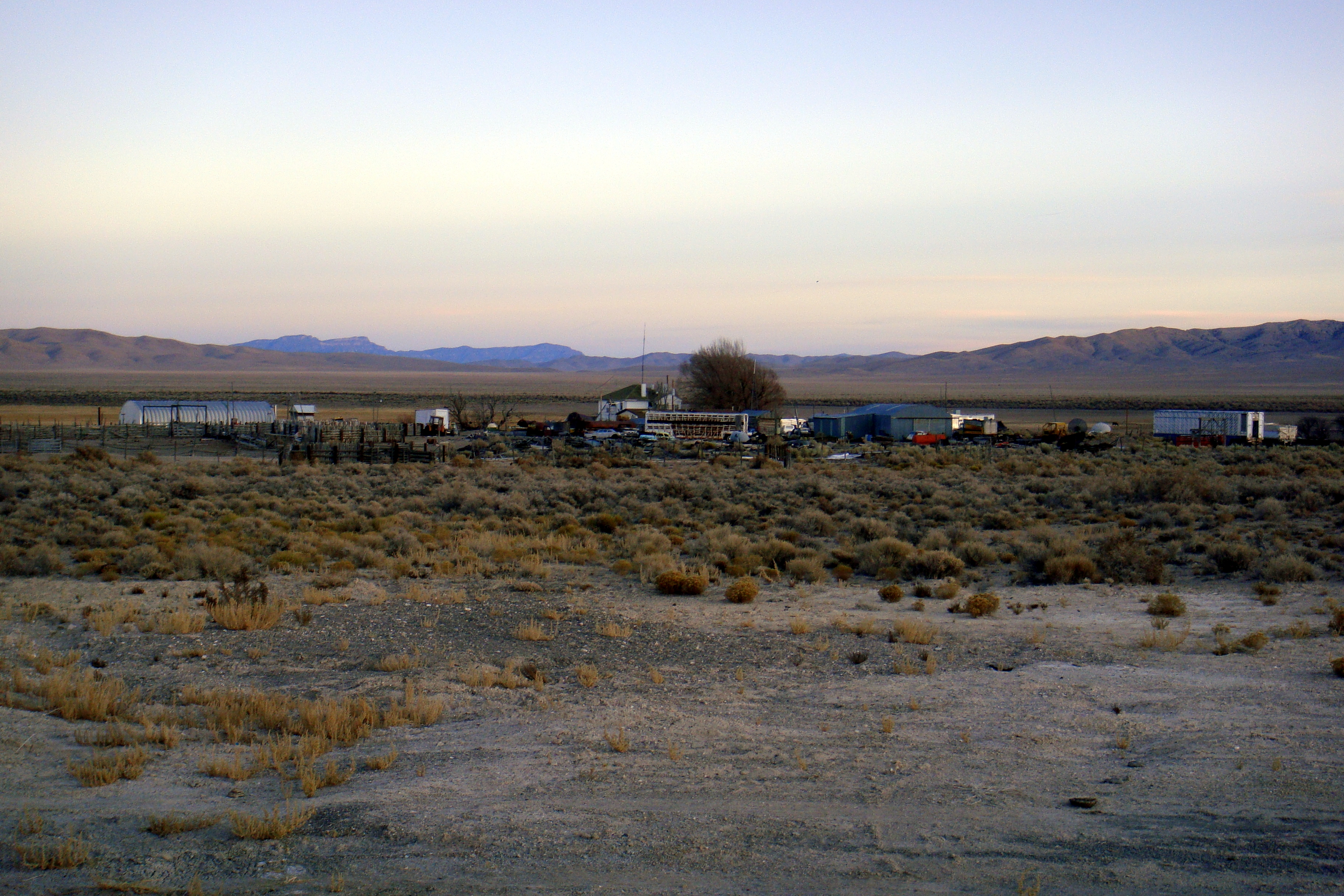
The historic Dearden Ranch

== History ==
It was founded as a Mormon farming community in the 1870s, with an early post office located at the Dearden Ranch. It was named after Margie Burbank Clay, the wife of local Judge E. W. Clay. Margie's obituary states that it was named in August 1949 after her mother when she, Margie, was age 96. Her mother was Laura Ann (Willard) Burbank (1819-1893). Clay was used as the name of the major spring that was first used by the settlers. This spring is the main source of water for Pruess Lake, to the north. Outlaws, cattle rustlers, and uncertainty over the local water sources caused the abandonment of the community, with the exception of the Dearden Ranch.

The Dearden Ranch was started in 1886 and has been home to the Dearden family ever since. The local springs that flow into Lake Creek have been informally named after the ranch, but are not named on maps or other documents, with the exception of water rights documents, which do name it Dearden Springs.
