= Partoun, Utah =

Unincorporated community in Utah, United States

- Unincorporated community
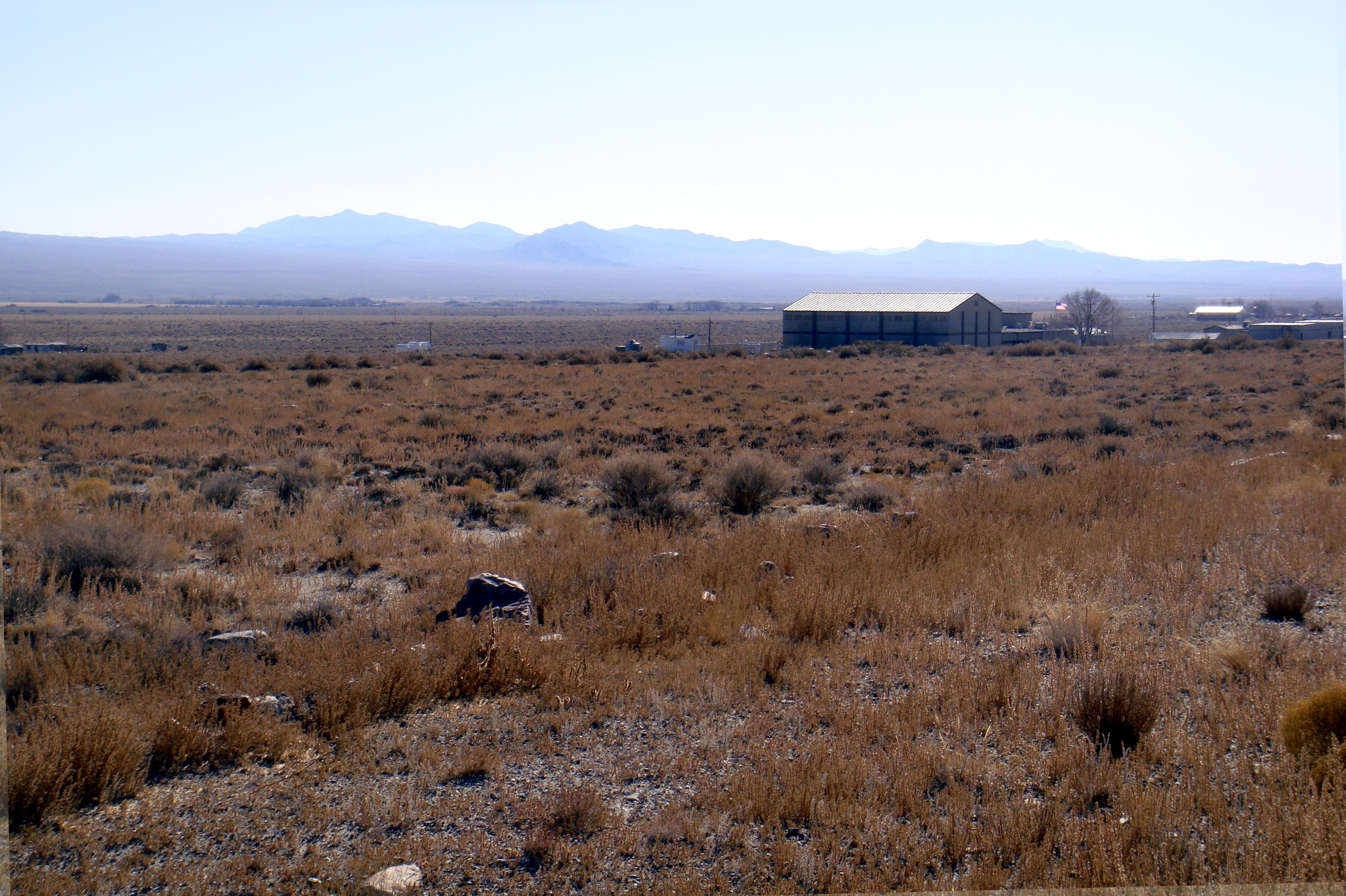
- View to the southeast showing Partoun and West Desert High School

- Location within Utah Location within the United States
- Coordinates: 39°38′36″N 113°53′16″W
- Country: United States
- State: Utah
- County: Juab
- Founded: 1949
- Named for: A Scottish town
- Elevation: 4,800 ft (1,463 m)
- GNIS feature ID: 1437285

Partoun /ˈpɑːrtuːn/ is an unincorporated community in Juab County, Utah, United States. It is located in Snake Valley at latitude 39.64661N and longitude -113.88700W with an elevation of 4,818' (1,469m). It was founded in 1949 by the religious group called the Aaronic Order, and named after a town in Scotland.

Partoun is part of the Provo–Orem, Utah Metropolitan Statistical Area.

Partoun is also home to both the West Desert High School and the West Desert Elementary School, even though the website mentions the neighboring community of Trout Creek to the north.

== Climate ==
Climate data for Partoun, Utah (Elevation 4,800ft)
Month	Jan	Feb	Mar	Apr	May	Jun	Jul	Aug	Sep	Oct	Nov	Dec	Year
Record high °F (°C)	69 (21)	74 (23)	82 (28)	92 (33)	100 (38)	105 (41)	107 (42)	105 (41)	100 (38)	93 (34)	78 (26)	67 (19)	107 (42)
Mean daily maximum °F (°C)	40.4 (4.7)	46.6 (8.1)	55.9 (13.3)	64.4 (18.0)	74.4 (23.6)	85.5 (29.7)	94.4 (34.7)	92.0 (33.3)	82.2 (27.9)	68.2 (20.1)	52.4 (11.3)	41.3 (5.2)	66.5 (19.2)
Mean daily minimum °F (°C)	13.7 (−10.2)	19.4 (−7.0)	25.8 (−3.4)	32.4 (0.2)	40.5 (4.7)	48.7 (9.3)	56.1 (13.4)	54.3 (12.4)	44.0 (6.7)	33.2 (0.7)	22.8 (−5.1)	14.7 (−9.6)	33.8 (1.0)
Record low °F (°C)	−23 (−31)	−29 (−34)	−2 (−19)	10 (−12)	16 (−9)	21 (−6)	36 (2)	31 (−1)	21 (−6)	2 (−17)	−7 (−22)	−27 (−33)	−29 (−34)
Average precipitation inches (mm)	0.42 (11)	0.50 (13)	0.54 (14)	0.72 (18)	0.94 (24)	0.69 (18)	0.56 (14)	0.57 (14)	0.58 (15)	0.61 (15)	0.46 (12)	0.35 (8.9)	6.93 (176)
Average snowfall inches (cm)	3.3 (8.4)	3.4 (8.6)	0.8 (2.0)	0.7 (1.8)	0.1 (0.25)	0 (0)	0 (0)	0 (0)	0 (0)	0.3 (0.76)	0.8 (2.0)	1.9 (4.8)	11.4 (29)
Source: The Western Regional Climate Center
