= Utah State Route 160 =

State highway in Beaver, Utah, United States

State Route 160
- I-15 Business Loop, Beaver

Route information
- Maintained by UDOT
- Length: 3.808 mi (6.128 km)
- Existed: 1971–present

Major junctions
- South end: I-15 near Beaver
- SR-21 in Beaver
- North end: I-15 in Beaver

Location
- Country: United States
- State: Utah

Highway system
- Interstate Highway System; Main; Auxiliary; Suffixed; Business; Future; Utah State Highway System; Interstate; US; State; Minor; Scenic
← SR-159	→ SR-161

State Route 160 (SR-160) is a state highway in the U.S. state of Utah providing a business loop around I-15 for the town of Beaver in the south-central portion of the state. The route is the main street for the town and spans 3.8 miles (6.1 km). The highway was established 1961 as I-15 was constructed through the area, replacing US-91.

== Route description ==
The highway begins at a diamond interchange on I-15 heading east and quickly turns north into Main Street. It continues in a northerly direction through the center of the town of Beaver for about 3 miles (4.8 km). In the main part of town, it intersects with SR-21 to the west and SR-153 to the east. After leaving town to the north, the route turns back to the west and ends at another diamond interchange with I-15.

== History ==
The current incarnation of State Route 160 was created in 1961 while I-15 was under construction in the area. It consisted of just 0.4 miles (0.64 km) of road from the I-15 interchange about 1.3 miles (2.1 km) south of Beaver northwest to US-91 (SR-1), which ran through the center of town as Main Street. At the same time, State Route 161 was also created, serving a similar purpose, but on the interchange 1 mile (1.6 km) north of Beaver.

When I-15 was completed north of town in 1964, SR-1 was rerouted as it left Beaver to connect with the new interstate, following the same route as SR-161. As a result, SR-161 was withdrawn to avoid the two state routes overlapping. In 1969, the rest of SR-1 through the town was realigned with I-15. As a result, SR-160 was extended northward to follow the former route of SR-1 along main street north through town, then turning northwest to the interchange at I-15.

== Major intersections ==
The entire route is in Beaver, Beaver County.

mi	km	Destinations	Notes
0.000	0.000	I-15 – Cedar City	Southern terminus
2.006	3.228	SR-21 west (Center Street)	
2.194	3.531	SR-153 east (200 North, Beaver Canyon Scenic Byway)	
3.808	6.128	I-15 – Fillmore	Northern terminus
1.000 mi = 1.609 km; 1.000 km = 0.621 mi
