= Snake Valley (Great Basin) =

Valley in Nevada and Utah, United States

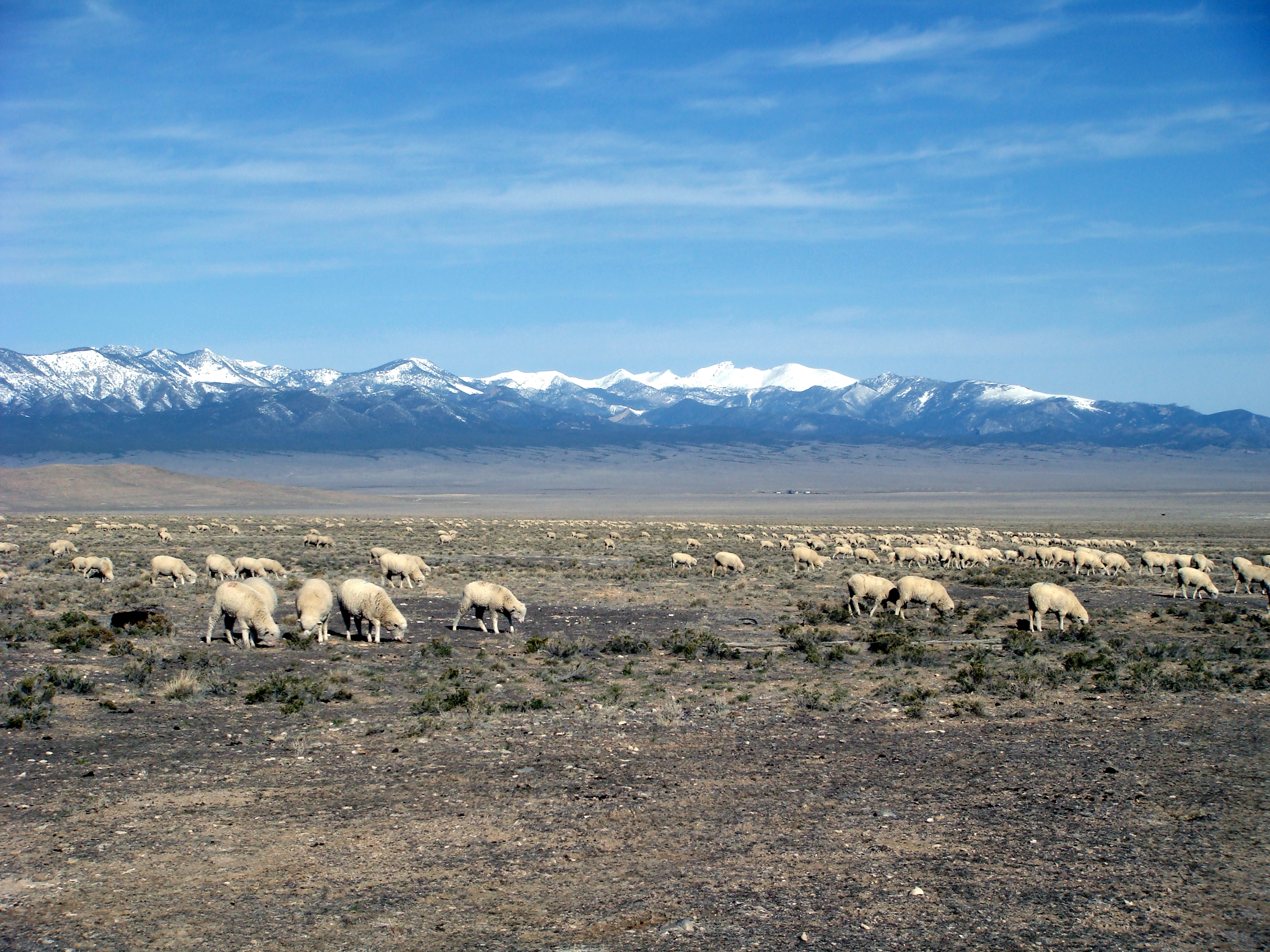
- Sheep grazing in southern Snake Valley

- Location within Utah Location within the United States
- Long-axis direction: North-South

Geography
- Coordinates: 39°51′00″N 113°45′03″W
- Interactive map of Snake Valley

Snake Valley is a north-south trending valley that straddles the Nevada–Utah border in the central Great Basin. It is bound by the Snake Range and the Deep Creek Mountains to the west and the Confusion Range to the east. The valley is the gateway to Great Basin National Park and Lehman Caves, which are located in the western part of the valley and on the southern Snake Range.

== People ==
Though it is relatively isolated from civilization today, the human presence in Snake Valley goes back 12,000 years. The oldest accessible evidence of this is the Baker Archeological Site, a Fremont culture habitat maintained by the BLM.

Current communities in the valley include Baker in Nevada and Garrison, Burbank, Eskdale, Callao, Partoun, Trout Creek, Gandy, and Border in Utah. Today, the main industries in the valley are farming and ranching, especially sheep ranching.

== Water ==
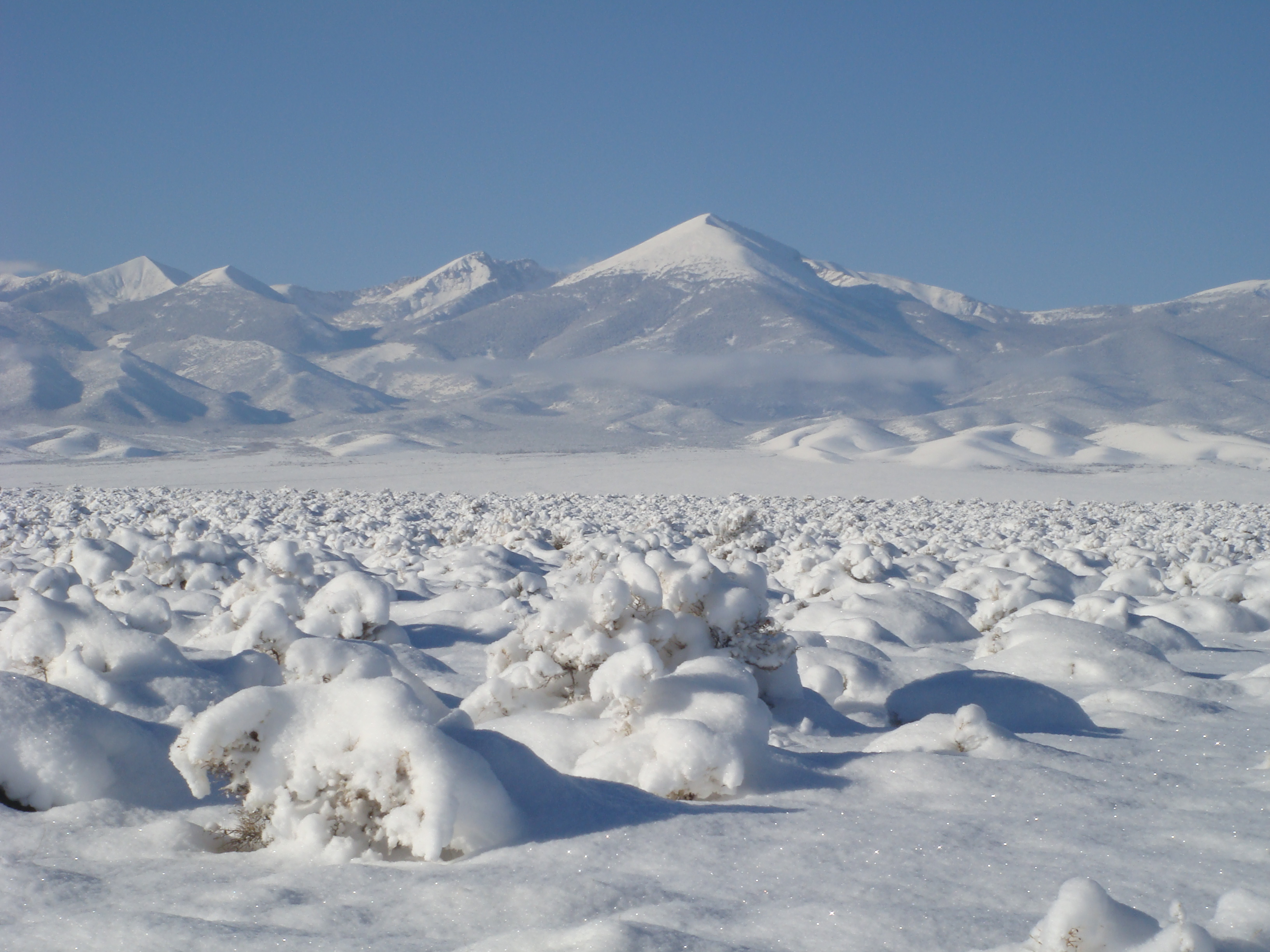
Snowpack in the high mountains west of Snake Valley contributes to the (relatively) large amount of groundwater available in the area

Snake Valley is noted for a water project involving the Las Vegas Valley, that would target the underlying Basin and Range Carbonate Aquifer, an aquifer that supplies local agriculture and is a relatively large source of water for this region. Though Snake Valley and the surrounding area is arid and part of the Great Basin Desert, the (relatively) high ranges like the Snake Range, Deep Creek Mountains, and the Schell Creek Range allow a large snowpack that recharges the regional aquifer. This 'additional' water manifests itself in the many springs, wetlands, and lakes that make Snake Valley surprisingly lush. Thus, Snake Valley has long been a target of wildlife and farmers, with at least one farm (Dearden Ranch in Burbank, Utah) in continual operation since the 1880s.

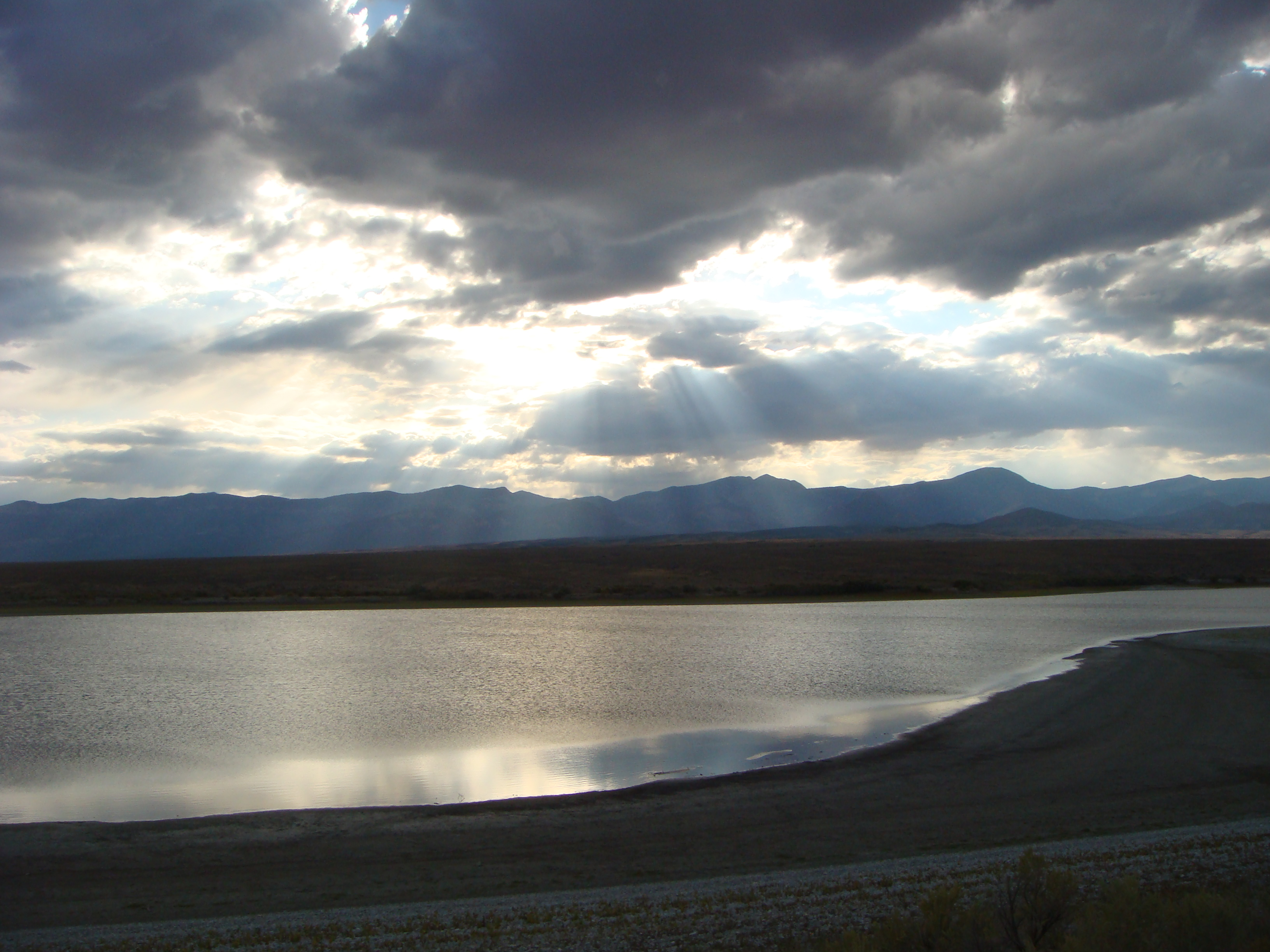
The most prominent body of water in Snake Valley, Pruess Lake

The water development project is proposed by the Southern Nevada Water Authority (SNWA), the water authority that services the Las Vegas area. In the proposal, a pipeline would be built from Snake Valley (and Spring Valley) to supply pumped groundwater to be used as municipal water for the Clark County, Nevada region, with amounts ranging up to 137,000 acre-feet (169,000,000 m^{3}) per year. Local ranchers and environmentalists have objected to this removal of water from local aquifers, comparing the situation to Owens Valley, California and noting local drawdowns and springs drying up allegedly, but indeterminably, from local agricultural pumping, like at Needle Point Springs. Enhanced demand on the water from locals and enhanced hydrogeologic monitoring have occurred as a result of this proposal, including the USGS's BARCASS study and the Utah Geological Survey's Snake Valley Groundwater Monitoring Program. Both studies have generally concluded that precipitation in the high mountains of the area are the source of the far away but anomalously large springs at Fish Springs National Wildlife Refuge.

Others support the system, noting the importance of the growth and sustainability of the Las Vegas Valley. The largest advocate for the pipeline has been SNWA General Manager Patricia Mulroy. Mulroy has continuously claimed that this water source must be tapped to keep Las Vegas running. Others agree, and have used New York City as an example of proper water management. New York has relied on water from the Catskills and Hudson Valley region for more than a century, and due to proper management, these ecosystems continue to flourish, despite the allocation of the water in the Catskills and Hudson Valley.
