= Callao, Utah =

Unincorporated community in Utah, United States

- Unincorporated community
- Location within Utah Location within the United States
- Coordinates: 39°53′52″N 113°42′31″W
- Country: United States
- State: Utah
- County: Juab
- Settled: 1860
- Named for: Callao
- Elevation: 4,337 ft (1,322 m)
- Time zone: UTC-7 (Mountain (MST))
  - Summer (DST): UTC-6 (MDT)
- ZIP code: 84034
- Area code: 435
- GNIS feature ID: 1437516

Callao (/ˈkælioʊ/ KAL-ee-oh) is a community in northern Snake Valley, along the border of Juab and Tooele counties, Utah, United States.

== Description ==
The community was part of the original Pony Express overland route, and was first called Willow Springs in 1860. E. W. Tripp, his wife, and their son were the first to establish residence there, in 1870. In 1895 it was decided that Willow Springs was too common a name, and a new name would be chosen. The name Callao was chosen because of a resemblance to Callao, Peru, suggested by an old grizzled 1890s prospector in the region who was working out of Gold Hill to the north.

Approximately 27 people live in Callao. By road, partially unpaved, the nearest towns to Callao are Wendover, Utah and West Wendover, Nevada 79 miles (127 km) distant. The two towns have a combined population of about 6,000. The Deep Creek Mountains and the proposed Deep Creek Wilderness are a few miles west of Callao. Callao is located on the southwestern edge of the Great Salt Lake Desert.

== Climate ==
According to the Köppen Climate Classification system, Callao is on the borderline between a semi-arid climate, abbreviated "BSk" on climate maps, and a desert Bwk climate.

Climate data for Callao, Utah (1991–2020 normals, extremes 1902–1905 and 1962–present)
Month	Jan	Feb	Mar	Apr	May	Jun	Jul	Aug	Sep	Oct	Nov	Dec	Year
Record high °F (°C)	69 (21)	74 (23)	91 (33)	89 (32)	96 (36)	100 (38)	104 (40)	106 (41)	99 (37)	90 (32)	77 (25)	73 (23)	106 (41)
Mean maximum °F (°C)	55.2 (12.9)	61.8 (16.6)	73.7 (23.2)	81.3 (27.4)	88.2 (31.2)	94.9 (34.9)	99.0 (37.2)	97.4 (36.3)	92.3 (33.5)	82.4 (28.0)	69.1 (20.6)	59.6 (15.3)	99.6 (37.6)
Mean daily maximum °F (°C)	37.9 (3.3)	45.2 (7.3)	56.2 (13.4)	63.1 (17.3)	72.1 (22.3)	82.4 (28.0)	90.7 (32.6)	89.1 (31.7)	79.3 (26.3)	65.2 (18.4)	50.3 (10.2)	39.0 (3.9)	64.2 (17.9)
Daily mean °F (°C)	26.1 (−3.3)	32.8 (0.4)	41.6 (5.3)	48.4 (9.1)	56.9 (13.8)	66.0 (18.9)	74.1 (23.4)	72.2 (22.3)	62.0 (16.7)	48.7 (9.3)	36.3 (2.4)	26.9 (−2.8)	49.3 (9.6)
Mean daily minimum °F (°C)	14.3 (−9.8)	20.4 (−6.4)	27.0 (−2.8)	33.7 (0.9)	41.7 (5.4)	49.5 (9.7)	57.5 (14.2)	55.3 (12.9)	44.7 (7.1)	32.3 (0.2)	22.2 (−5.4)	14.8 (−9.6)	34.5 (1.4)
Mean minimum °F (°C)	−2.2 (−19.0)	5.5 (−14.7)	14.9 (−9.5)	20.9 (−6.2)	29.4 (−1.4)	37.6 (3.1)	46.6 (8.1)	44.7 (7.1)	32.1 (0.1)	19.6 (−6.9)	8.1 (−13.3)	1.1 (−17.2)	−5.0 (−20.6)
Record low °F (°C)	−24 (−31)	−23 (−31)	2 (−17)	8 (−13)	19 (−7)	30 (−1)	36 (2)	28 (−2)	20 (−7)	2 (−17)	−2 (−19)	−23 (−31)	−24 (−31)
Average precipitation inches (mm)	0.48 (12)	0.44 (11)	0.52 (13)	0.78 (20)	1.03 (26)	0.55 (14)	0.37 (9.4)	0.48 (12)	0.55 (14)	0.65 (17)	0.38 (9.7)	0.38 (9.7)	6.61 (168)
Average snowfall inches (cm)	3.6 (9.1)	2.2 (5.6)	0.9 (2.3)	0.6 (1.5)	0.0 (0.0)	0.0 (0.0)	0.0 (0.0)	0.0 (0.0)	0.0 (0.0)	0.0 (0.0)	1.2 (3.0)	3.5 (8.9)	12.0 (30)
Average precipitation days (≥ 0.01 in)	4.8	4.0	4.5	6.2	7.0	3.8	3.9	4.1	4.0	4.1	3.2	3.7	53.3
Average snowy days (≥ 0.1 in)	2.4	1.3	0.8	0.2	0.0	0.0	0.0	0.0	0.0	0.1	0.7	2.3	7.8
Source: NOAA
