= Garrison, Utah =

Unincorporated community in the state of Utah, United States

Garrison
- Unincorporated community
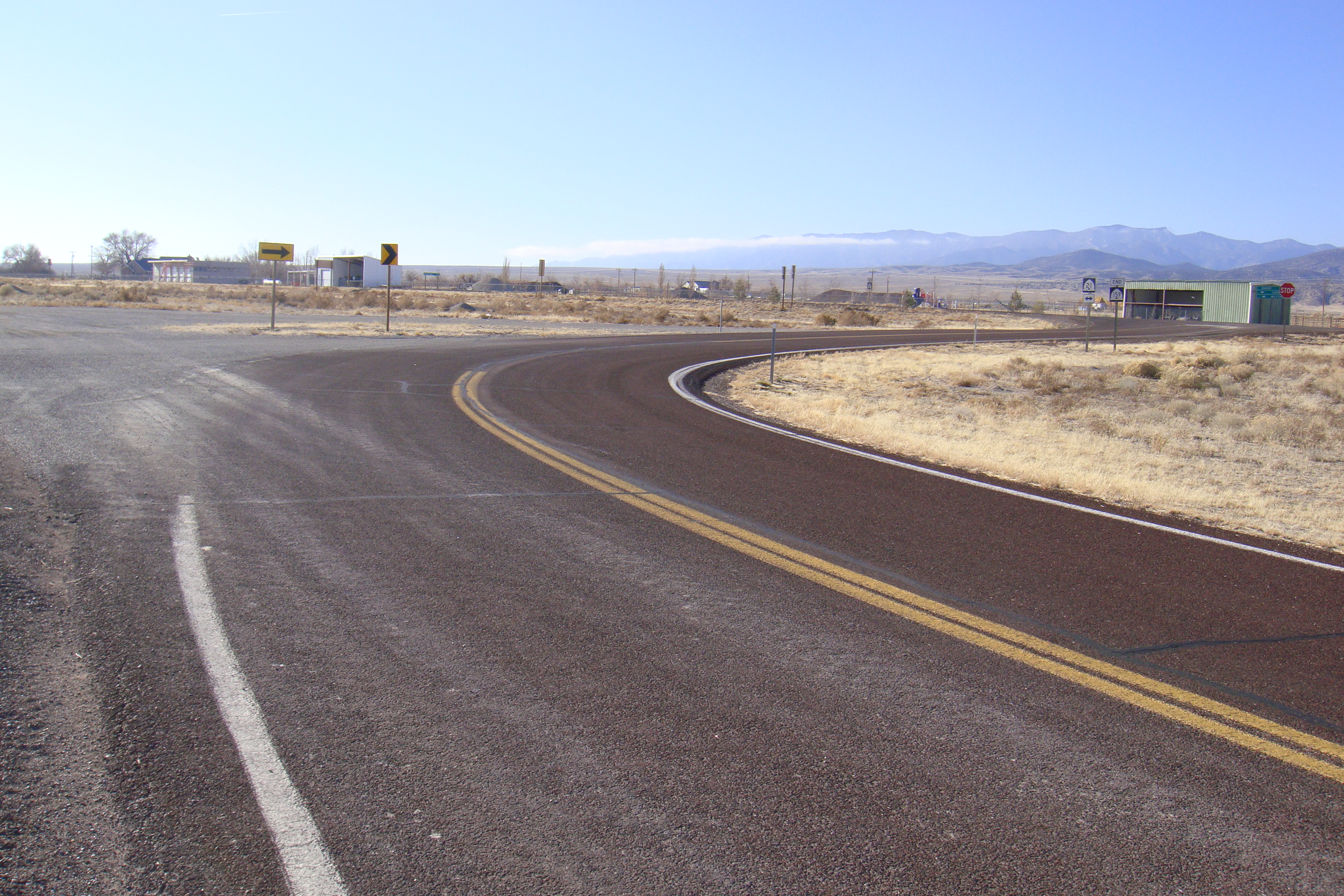
- A view of downtown and the UDOT yard, on Utah State Route 159

- Location within the state of Utah
- Coordinates: 38°56′04″N 114°01′59″W
- Country: United States
- State: Utah
- County: Millard
- Elevation: 5,276 ft (1,608 m)
- Time zone: UTC-7 (Mountain (MST))
  - Summer (DST): UTC-6 (MDT)
- ZIP codes: 84728
- Area code: 435
- GNIS feature ID: 1428153

Garrison is an unincorporated community in western Millard County, Utah, United States. It is home to a Utah Department of Transportation yard and office, but other than that, offers no services.

== ZIP code ==
The 84728 ZIP code, which includes Garrison as the primary population center, has 158 residents spread out over 335.54 square miles. The median household income is $37,857 and 62 out of 83 housing units are occupied. Three public school run by the Millard School District serve the area covered by the ZIP code: the Garrison School (elementary), Garrison 7th & 8th, and Eskdale High School.

== Geography ==
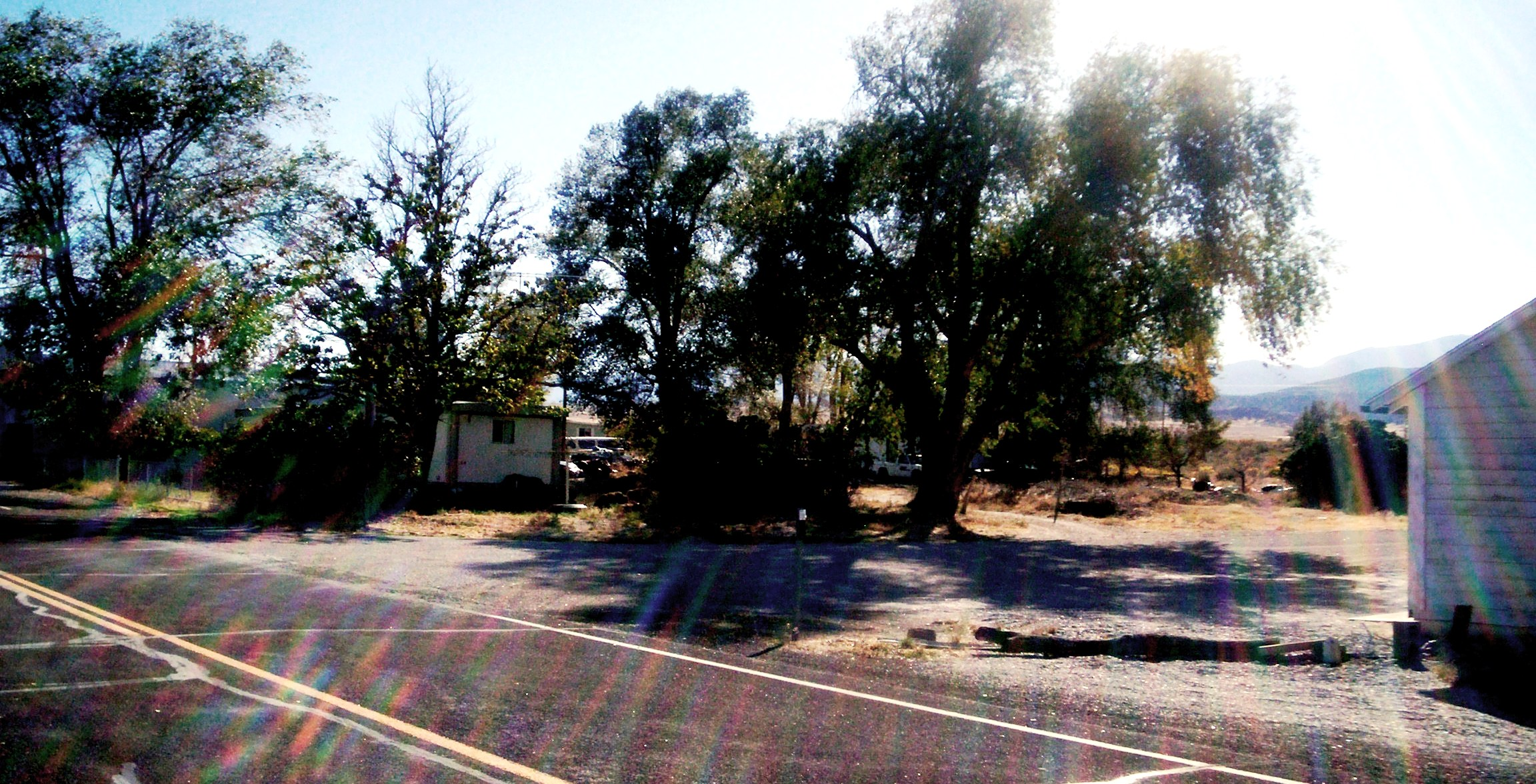
Garrison, Utah

Garrison is located in Snake Valley in the far west central area of the state just east of the Nevada state line. In fact, some of the town's farms and structures are legally in Nevada. The Great Basin National Park is in Nevada just a few miles west of the border, accessed via Baker.

== History ==
Historical population
Census	Pop.	Note	%±
1910	88		—
1920	109		23.9%
1930	90		−17.4%
1940	60		−33.3%
1950	84		40.0%
Source: U.S. Census Bureau

Founded as a cattle rustling and outlaw community in the 1850s, the town of Garrison later became the center of mining interests. The name comes from the Garrison family who farmed in the area. After mining interests subsided, the Garrisons had a livestock and hay ranch. Mrs. Garrison was a schoolteacher who also handled the mail, and the town's name honors her.

== Climate ==
Garrison experiences a semi-arid climate with hot summers and cold winter. Due to Garrison's elevation and aridity, the Diurnal temperature variation is substantial.

Climate data for Garrison, Utah
Month	Jan	Feb	Mar	Apr	May	Jun	Jul	Aug	Sep	Oct	Nov	Dec	Year
Record high °F (°C)	71 (22)	73 (23)	79 (26)	86 (30)	95 (35)	108 (42)	106 (41)	104 (40)	98 (37)	91 (33)	80 (27)	72 (22)	108 (42)
Mean daily maximum °F (°C)	41.4 (5.2)	47.1 (8.4)	54.8 (12.7)	64.5 (18.1)	73.4 (23.0)	84.4 (29.1)	92.3 (33.5)	89.2 (31.8)	80.0 (26.7)	67.1 (19.5)	53.2 (11.8)	43.3 (6.3)	65.9 (18.8)
Mean daily minimum °F (°C)	15.4 (−9.2)	20.9 (−6.2)	26.2 (−3.2)	32.2 (0.1)	39.6 (4.2)	48.1 (8.9)	56.6 (13.7)	55.6 (13.1)	45.3 (7.4)	34.2 (1.2)	24.6 (−4.1)	16.8 (−8.4)	34.6 (1.4)
Record low °F (°C)	−21 (−29)	−26 (−32)	−5 (−21)	9 (−13)	12 (−11)	27 (−3)	33 (1)	33 (1)	20 (−7)	1 (−17)	−14 (−26)	−20 (−29)	−26 (−32)
Average precipitation inches (mm)	0.43 (11)	0.48 (12)	0.83 (21)	0.72 (18)	0.72 (18)	0.43 (11)	0.54 (14)	0.72 (18)	0.73 (19)	0.76 (19)	0.61 (15)	0.42 (11)	7.42 (188)
Average snowfall inches (cm)	4.4 (11)	4.2 (11)	6.1 (15)	2.9 (7.4)	1.0 (2.5)	0.2 (0.51)	0 (0)	0 (0)	0.0 (0.0)	1.4 (3.6)	3.7 (9.4)	3.1 (7.9)	26.8 (68)
Source: The Western Regional Climate Center
