= Black Mountains (Utah) =

Mountain range in the American state of Utah

- Location within Utah

Highest point
- Peak: Mahogany Knoll, (northeastern east-west ridgeline)-Black Mountains
- Elevation: 6,729 ft (2,051 m)
- Coordinates: 37°18′14″N 113°33′15″W

Dimensions
- Length: 30 mi (48 km) (30 x 28 mi, ridgeline west, two ridgelines to southwest-w/Long Hollow)
- Width: 28 mi (45 km) E-W

Geography
- Country: United States
- State: Utah
- Counties: Iron and Beaver
- Communities: Minersville, Enoch, Summit, Parowan, Paragonah, Greenville and Adamsville
- Range coordinates: 38°05′21″N 112°50′04″W
- Borders on: Escalante Desert, Mineral Mountains, Minersville Reservoir, Beaver, Utah, Tushar Mountains, Parowan Valley, Hurricane Cliffs, Hurricane Cliffs and Markagunt Plateau

The Black Mountains is a 30-mile (48 km) long mountain range in northeastern Iron County and southeastern Beaver County in southwestern Utah, United States.

The range borders the northeast portion of the Escalante Desert, and the range's southeast flank trends with the Hurricane Cliffs and Parowan Valley. In the south section, of a southwest trending ridgeline, is the Parowan Gap Petroglyphs Site. At the terminus of the ridgeline, the pass at the Summit, Utah region, there is the site of the Old Spanish National Historic Trail as it crossed into the northeast of Cedar Valley, the site of Cedar City.

Interstate 15 (I-15) traverses the southeast region of the range from Cedar City, to Greenville-Beaver.

== Description ==
The Black Mountains have a complex shape. It has an east–west ridgeline at the north perimeter with the Beaver River in the west, and Minersville Reservoir in the center; the northeast foothills border the region of Beaver-Greenville, Utah.

The highpoint of the range, Mahogany Knoll, is in the northeast on the ridgeline, the line between Iron and Beaver Counties.

From the northeast range terminus, a ridgeline extends southwest to Cedar Valley, and borders the northwest of Parowan Valley. The valley is narrow, separated from the northeast-section of the Hurricane Cliffs, and at the southwest terminus of the valley, is the location of Summit, (at the summit region). The Old Spanish National Historic Trail followed the summit, (only 1 mile [1.6 km] between Black Mountains and Hurricane Cliffs), and crossed west across the north region of Cedar Valley, at the south terminus of the Black Mountains ridgeline, near Enoch. About 10 miles (16 km) northeast of Enoch, and 8 miles (13 km) northwest of Parowan. South of the Black Mountains is the Red Hills range, which contains the Parowan Gap Petroglyphs site.

The center-east of the range is near Chipman Peak, 7,966 feet (2,428 m). The highpoint of the range is Mahogany Knoll, 7,976 feet (2,431 m), at the north ridgeline, east of center.

== Access ==
Utah State Route 21 (SR-21)borders the north of the range following the Beaver River from Minersville Reservoir; at the center-north foothills, SR-21 turns northeast towards Beaver and Greenville.

The range is dissected west of center, by the north–south Utah State Route 130 (SR-130), from Minersville at the range's northwest region, (and the northeast Escalante Desert); SR-130 goes south through Parowan Canyon, and then across an alluvial plains region of Long Hollow, between two southwest-trending ridgelines. The route meets the north of Cedar Valley, and the site of Rush Lake, a dry lake; the valley turns northwest into the Escalante Desert. The route continues to Enoch, and I-15 at Cedar City.

At the Black Mountains southeast, I-15 follows the southeast side of Parowan Valley, from Enoch, Summit, then Parowan, then north to Greenville, at the south of Beaver, Utah.

== See also ==
- List of mountain ranges of Utah
