= Beaver Valley (Utah) =

Valley in Beaver County, Utah, United States

- Location within Utah Location within the United States
- Length: 16 mi (26 km)

Geography
- Country: United States
- State: Utah
- County: Beaver
- Borders on: Mineral Mountains; Tushar Mountains; Black Mountains (Utah)
- Coordinates: 38°16′35″N 112°38′20″W
- River: Beaver River
- Lake: Minersville Reservoir
- Interactive map of Beaver Valley

Beaver Valley is a 16-mile (26 km) long small valley located in eastern Beaver County, Utah, United States. The valley is nestled between three mountain ranges, with the Mineral Mountains at its western border, but also an outlying peak section on the mountain range northeast, forming the northern border of the valley.

Beaver Valley is the location of the county seat of Beaver, and from the mountains numerous creeks, streams, and the Beaver River converge. In the valley's southwest, Minersville Reservoir is the downstream region of the valley. From the west end of the reservoir, the Beaver River goes west past Minersville into the northeast of the Escalante Desert, and towards Sevier Lake (north).

== Description ==
The valley is mostly a north trending valley. In the north the small mountains at the northeast of the Mineral Mountains divide the valley into a northwest section, and a northeast section, (the route of Interstate 15 to Sulphurdale).

In the valley's center and south, the widest section is about 12-mi wide. The south end of the valley borders an east-west stretch of the Black Mountains, at its northeast terminus region; I-15 traverses southwest past the mountain range, and into the northeast of Parowan Valley. Also, the south end of the valley has the location of Greenville, Utah, located on the Greenville Bench, along the east-west mountain foothills.

== Access ==
Interstate 15 traverses the center sections of the valley, north-south. Northbound I-15 heads toward Sulphurdale, about 23-mile (37 km) distant. Southbound I-15 turns southwest into the Parowan Valley to meet Parowan. SR-21 from Minersville, enters the valley's southwest, traverses the southwest of the Minersville Reservoir, and ends at Beaver. From Beaver, Utah State Route 153 transits eastward, and enters the Tushar Mountains through Beaver Canyon, and traverses the center-south of the Tushar range.

== See also ==
- List of valleys of Utah
