= Beaver Bottoms =

Valley in Utah, United States

Beaver Bottoms is a valley in northeastern Beaver and southeastern Millard counties, Utah, United States.

== Description ==
The valley heads at 38°28′00″N 113°00′30″W north of Milford and lies between the San Francisco Mountains to the west and the Mineral Mountains to the east. It is drained to the north by the Beaver River through the mouth of the valley south of the Cricket Mountains and north of Black Rock. Cove Creek drains into the Bottoms from the east and sinks into the sands there before it can join the Beaver River.

== See also ==
- List of valleys of Utah
