= Cove Creek (Beaver and Millard counties, Utah) =

Stream in Utah, United States

Cove Creek is a stream in Beaver County and Millard County, Utah. It originates at the head of its canyon southeast of Cove Fort at 38°38′09″N 112°29′34″W in Beaver County. It drains north down through the Tushar Mountains then turns west at the foot of Sulphur Peak running between the south end of the Pavant Range and the Tushar Mountains, past Cove Fort, from which it received its name. It then runs west past the north end of the Mineral Mountains to disappear into the sands of the desert at Beaver Bottoms.

== History ==
In the Cove Creek valley, 2 miles above the site of Cove Fort along what became Cove Creek, among some willows, was the location of a spring branch that the diary of Charles C. Rich, an 1849 Mormon traveler on the Mormon Road called Emigrant Spring, that provided "good grass and water" for camping places along a two-mile stretch of Cove Creek for travelers between Corn Creek and Sage Creek.

== See also ==
- List of rivers of Utah
