= Indian Creek (Beaver River tributary) =

Indian Creek, originally known as Sage Creek, is a tributary stream of the Beaver River in Beaver County, Utah. Its mouth is at its confluence with the Beaver River at an elevation of 5,499 feet (1,676 meters) above the Minersville Reservoir, 0.4 miles south of Adamsville. Its source is at 38°24′31″N 112°26′55″W, on the northwest slope of Mount Baldy (Beaver County, Utah) at an elevation of 10,600 feet in the Tushar Mountains.

== History ==
Indian Creek was originally named Sage Creek by the Jefferson Hunt Wagon Train in 1849, that camped at a crossing point on its banks and measured its distance from there to Cove Fort. Later published in the Mormon Waybill Cove Fort was 22.25 miles (35.81 km) north of their location on the Mormon Road. It was also 5.125 mi (8.248 km) north of the ford at Greenville, Utah, that crossed what they called Beaver Creek, now known as the Beaver River.

== See also ==
- List of rivers of Utah
