= Cedar Valley (Iron County, Utah) =

Valley in Iron County, Utah, United States

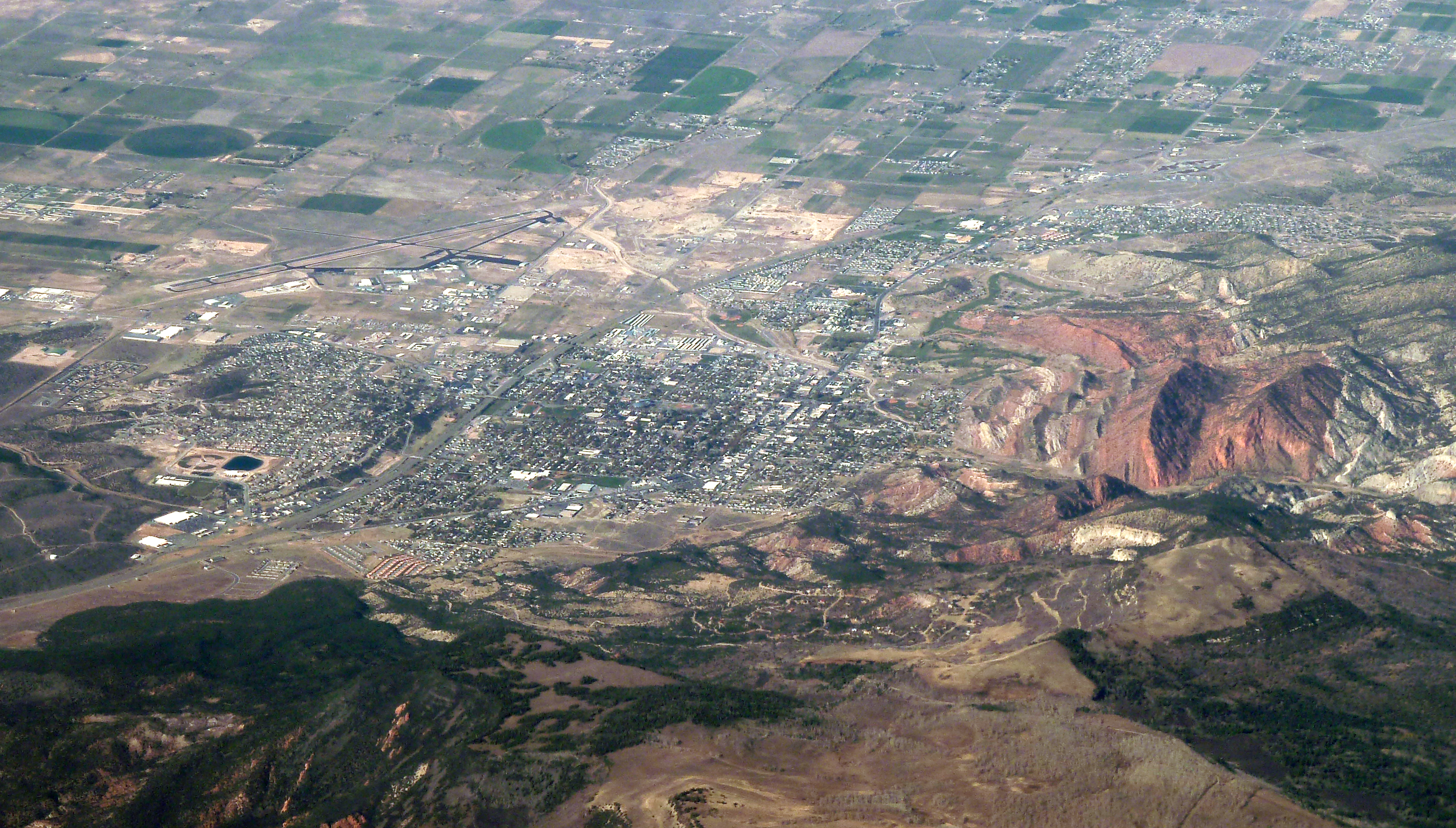
- Cedar Valley and Cedar City, November 2010

- Location within Utah
- Length: 25 mi (40 km) SW x NE

Geography
- Country: United States
- State: Utah
- Regions: Great Basin; Escalante Desert
- County: Iron
- Communities: List: Cedar City; Enoch; Halivah; Hamilton Fort; Kanarraville; Stevensville (site); Fort Johnson (site)
- Borders on: List: (Antelope Range (Utah); Iron Springs, Utah; Escalante Desert; Black Mountains (Utah); Cedar Mountains
- Coordinates: 37°39′30″N 113°06′46″W
- Lakes: Rush Lake; Quichapa Lake
- Interactive map of Cedar Valley

The Cedar Valley of Iron County, Utah, United States is a 25-mile (40 km) long valley located in the southeast of the county, against the Hurricane Cliffs which border the Cedar Mountains and the Markagunt Plateau.

Cedar Valley borders the southeast of the Escalante Desert, at its north and northwest. Cedar City, Utah lies in the valley's center and east, at the foothills of the Hurricane Cliffs.

== Description ==
Cedar Valley is northeast trending. It narrows in the southwest, between mountain ranges; in this southwest section, the Harmony Mountains are west, and the Hurricane Cliffs are east, bordering the Kolob Terrace.

The valley is mostly about 6-to-8-mile (9.7 to 12.9 km) wide, between mountains, or ranges, or the Hurricane Cliffs, to the east, which is a 75-mi long landform, from Hurricane, Utah at its southwest end.

The valley's north and northwest terminus merges into the Mud Spring Wash–Rush Lake region at the southwest of the Black Mountains (Utah), (and the southeast perimeter of the Escalante Desert); a ridgeline extending southwest from the Black Mountains parallels the Hurricane Cliffs, and its terminus is at the north end of Cedar Valley (and Rush Lake). Between the ridgeline, and Hurricane Cliffs, east, Interstate 15 traverses, (only about 1-mi wide, adjacent the site of Summit). It is also the route of the former Old Spanish National Historic Trail. The Historic Trail traverses the Cedar Valley from Enoch in the northeast, across the center-north to exit through the hills northwest, and through the townsite of Iron Springs, between the hills, and on the southeast edge of the Escalante Desert.

=== Valley lowpoints ===
Quichapa Lake (dry lake) is located in the center-south of the valley, 4 miles (6.4 km) northwest of Hamilton Fort, and fed by washes and creeks, from both the northwest and southwest, and from the southeast, (Hurricane Cliffs and Cedar Mountains).

At the valley's north-northwest terminus, Mud Spring Wash flows northwest into the Escalante Desert. The intermittent dry lake, Rush Lake is at its origin; Rush Lake is adjacent the ridgeline southwest from the Black Mountains, and at the downhill region of the alluvial fan, Long Hollow.

== Access ==
Interstate (I-15) traverses almost the entire length of the valley starting at the southwest, follows the valley's east, against the Hurricane Cliffs, and exits between the Cliffs and a ridgeline southeast from the Black Mountains. I-15 enters the southwest of Parowan Valley.

From the north, Utah State Route 130 (SR-130) travels due-south from Minersville through the Black Mountains, then a 10-mile (16 km) stretch through Long Hollow, an alluvial foothill section between two ridgelines of the Black Mountains, the foothills/alluvial fan area meeting the north terminus of Cedar Valley. SR-130, joins I-15 just north of Cedar City.

Utah State Route 56 (SR-56) crosses the valley center, east-west. The route enters the center-southwest Cedar Valley region, and the route lies between the Antelope Range, north, and the Harmony Mountains, south. The route comes from Iron Mountain, Utah, and Iron Mountain Wye, in the mountains. In the Antelope Range, north, Iron Spring Road meets the valley center-northwest; the route comes from Iron Mountain, located between off-lying peaks east of the Antelope Range.

The Lund Highway, formerly designated as Utah State Route 19 (1927-1969), enters the valley's northwest from Lund, located in the center-(and northwest perimeter region) of the Escalante Desert; Lund is about 30 miles (48 km) from Cedar Valley's center.
