= Mineral Mountains (Utah) =

Mountain in the American state of Utah

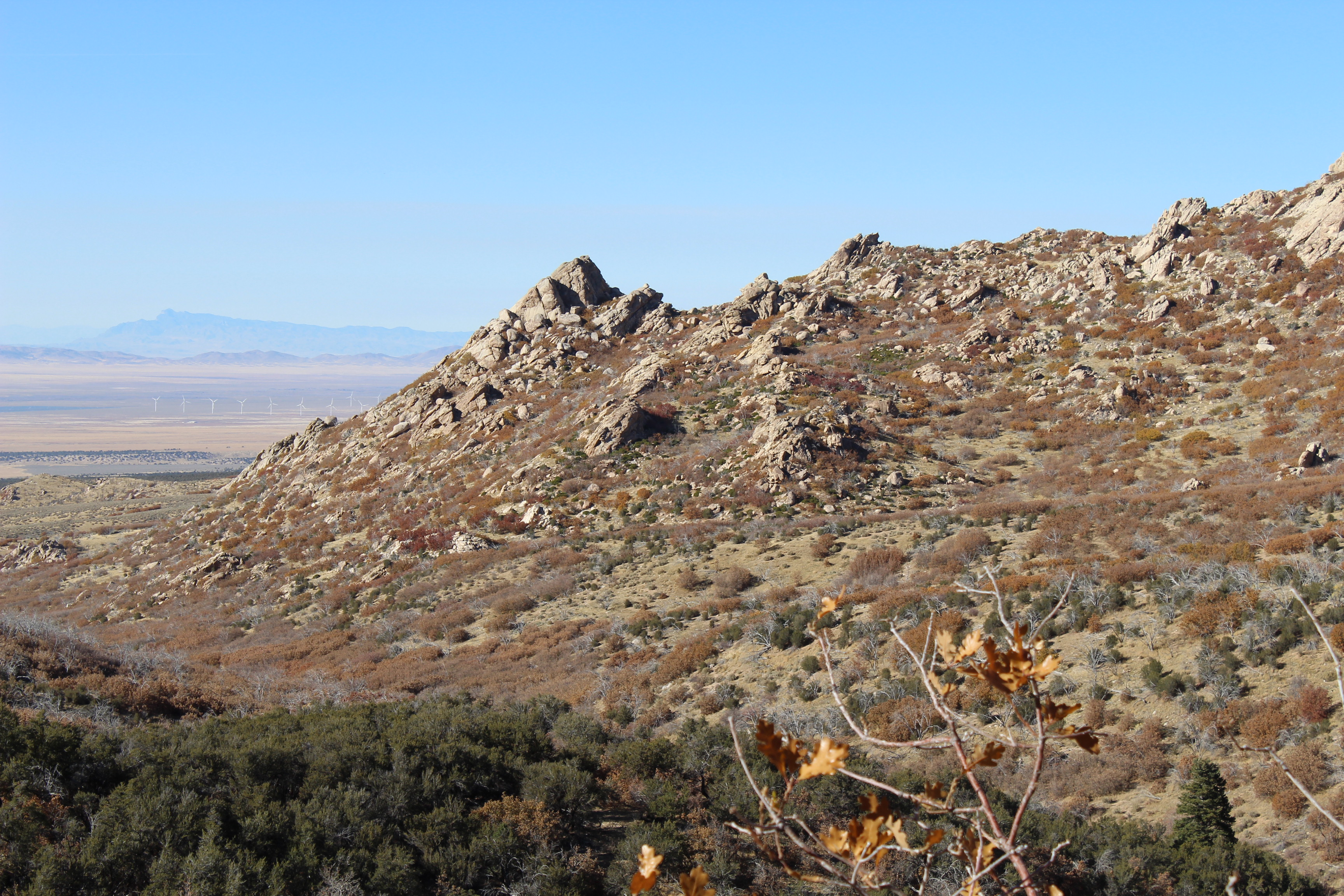
- Mineral Mountains near Milford

Highest point
- Peak: Granite Peak
- Elevation: 9,377 ft (2,858 m)
- Coordinates: 38°22′58″N 112°48′56″W

Dimensions
- Length: 28 mi (45 km)
- Width: 17 mi (27 km)

Geography
- Location within Utah
- Country: United States
- State: Utah
- Regions: Great Basin Desert, Sevier Desert, Black Rock Desert and Escalante Desert
- Counties: Beaver and Millard
- Communities: Milford, Minersville, Cook Corner, Murdock, Read, Black Rock, Sulphurdale and Cove Fort
- Range coordinates: 38°22′58″N 112°48′56″W
- Borders on: Star Range, Milford Valley, Milford, Black Rock Desert volcanic field, Pavant Range, Tushar Mountains, Beaver Valley, Black Mountains and Escalante Desert
- Topo map(s): USGS Bearskin Mtn, Utah

The Mineral Mountains are a 28 miles (45 km) long mountain range located in eastern Beaver and southeastern Millard counties in southwestern Utah. The Escalante Desert is to its southwest, the Black Rock Desert volcanic field and the Sevier Desert are to the north and northwest. The Pavant Range and Tushar Mountains lie to the east.

The west side of the range borders the small Milford Valley with the Star Range beyond. Beaver River flows past the south and west sides of the range. The river is impounded as Minersville Reservoir adjacent to the southeast margin of the range.

Milford Flat at the Mineral Mountains was the origin of the Milford Flat Fire which burned eastwards beyond Interstate 15 and Cove Fort into the Tushar and Pavant mountains.

The mountains are also the source of the ornamental stone known as Utah Picasso 'Jasper', being more correctly a type of limestone or marble.

== Description ==
The range has a north-south length of about 28 miles (45 km) . The northeast has an off-lying triangular mountain section which causes the north of Beaver Valley to bifurcate. East of the mountain section, I-15 transits to Sulphurdale. The section contains many peaks, with the highest being Gillies Hill, 7,888 feet (2,404 m). The southwest side of the section contains south-flowing Cunningham Wash.

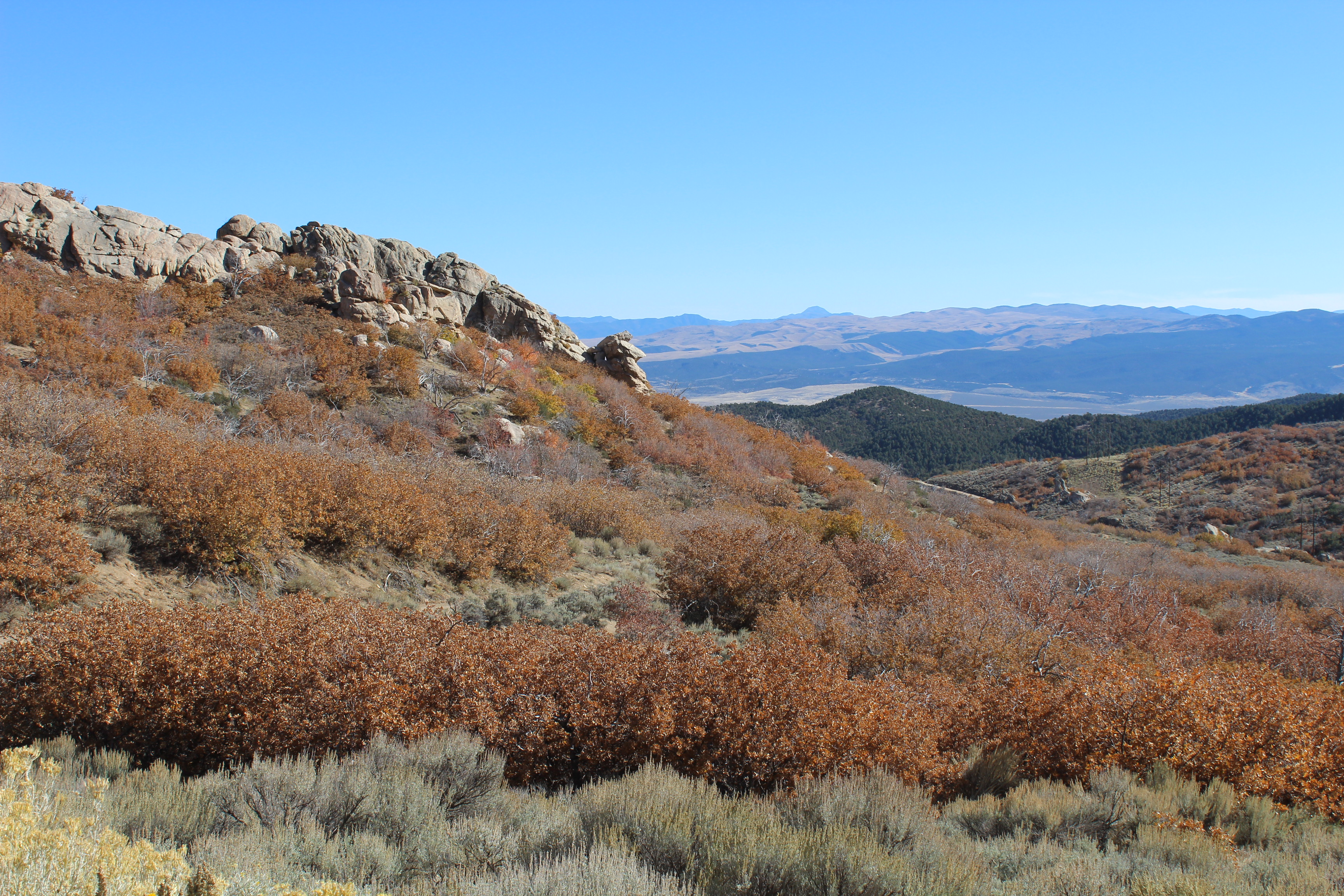
Facing east toward Beaver Valley from the Mineral Mountains

The south-southeast side of the range is a straight stretch from Cunningham Wash, north and the Minersville Reservoir, south, a collection of numerous watercourses from Beaver Valley, and neighboring mountains. Beaver River (Utah) enters the reservoir and leaves flowing due-west at the southern Mineral Mountains terminus. The terminus of the range comes to a V-shaped point; the river stretch, and mountains, are only 4-mi wide from the outlet of the Beaver River at the reservoir. The range then immediately turns into a stretch of southwest foothills, also a short stretch, only about 9-mi long.

The northwest stretch begins at that point, about 7 or 8-mi southeast of Milford; it transits to an east-west stretch at the north, which continues to the outlying mountain section east, and its junction with the west flank of the Pavant-Tushar Mountains massif.

A small, narrow 3-mile (4.8 km) wide ridgeline feeds north-northwest from the north stretch; it extends about 6-mi toward the Black Rock Desert volcanic field region, and contains Pinnacle Pass, and a highpoint of Antelope Mountain, 7,230 feet (2,200 m).

== Access ==
One major access route to the Mineral Mountains is Interstate 15 through Beaver Valley and the northeast of the range. Danish Reservoir Road, going due-west from I-15 at Cove Fort, accesses north regions of the range by unimproved roads.

The northwest of the range can be accessed from Milford and Milford Valley by way of unimproved roads. Utah State Route 21 (SR-21) also transits through Milford, due-southeast to Minersville which sits at the range's southwest foothills.

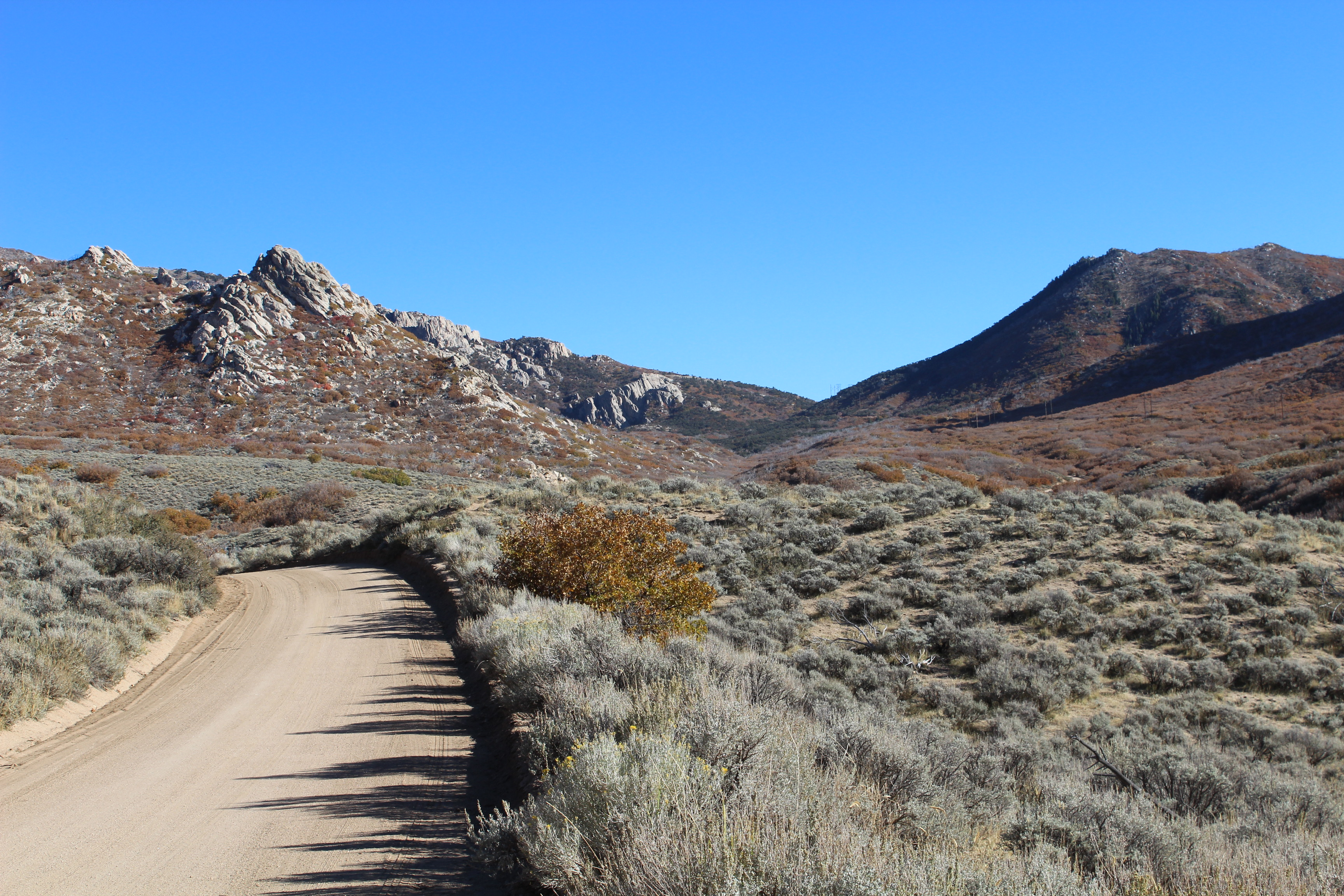
The Pass Road goes through Soldier Pass in the Mineral Mountains.

SR-21 transits from Minersville, through the Beaver River (Utah) canyon going due-east; it skirts the southeast side of the Minersville Reservoir, entering southeast Beaver Valley. The reservoir is at the southeast foothills of the range. By wany of unimproved roads, the southeast foothills-(south section) can be accessed from Adamsville located at the reservoir's north. The north section can be accessed by routes from the northwest of Beaver Valley, and the Cunningham Wash region.

A minor, improved route, northeast of Adamsville, and west of Beaver, off SR-21, The Pass Road, to Soldier Pass, transits southeast-by-northwest through the center of the Mineral Mountains; it exits the range at the west, center foothills and transits northwest to Milford, from the foothills to Milford, about 7-mile (11 km) distant. The entire route just through the Mineral Mountains itself, is only about 6-mile (9.7 km), thus it forms a "shortcut route", from Beaver, and Beaver Valley townsites, to Milford.. This is the route taken by the American Discovery Trail.
