= Birch Creek Mountain =

Mountain in Utah, United States

Birch Creek Peak
- Location within Utah Location within the United States

Highest point
- Elevation: 10,738 feet (3,273 m)
- Coordinates: 38°13′08″N 112°27′16″W

Geography
- Location: Beaver County, Utah, United States
- Parent range: Tushar Mountains

Birch Creek Mountain is a 10,738 feet (3,273 m) tall peak in the Tushar Mountains, located in Beaver County, Utah. By elevation Birch Creek Mountain is # 9 out of 94 in Beaver County, # 42 out of 201 in Fishlake National Forest, and # 18 out of 49 in the Tushar Mountains.

== Etymology ==
Birch Creek Mountain is named for Birch Creek which originates on the western slope of the mountain and flows northwest to South Creek, under Interstate 15 south of the town of Beaver, and thence to the Beaver River and ultimately Sevier River and Lake.
