= Adamsville, Utah =

Unincorporated community in the state of Utah, United States

- Unincorporated community
- Location within Utah Location within the United States
- Coordinates: 38°15′30″N 112°47′38″W
- Country: United States
- State: Utah
- County: Beaver
- Settled: May 1, 1862
- Founder: David B. Adams
- Elevation: 5,528 ft (1,685 m)
- Time zone: UTC-7 (Mountain (MST))
  - Summer (DST): UTC-6 (MDT)
- ZIP code: 84731
- Area code: 435
- GNIS feature ID: 1425050

Adamsville is an unincorporated community in Beaver County, Utah, United States.

Historical population
Census	Pop.	Note	%±
1870	179		—
1880	192		7.3%
1890	125		−34.9%
1900	127		1.6%
1910	145		14.2%
1920	126		−13.1%
1930	121		−4.0%
1940	98		−19.0%
1950	50		−49.0%
Source: U.S. Census Bureau

== Geography ==
Adamsville is at the west end of Beaver Valley in eastern Beaver County. It lies at the base of the Mineral Mountains, just northeast of Minersville Reservoir along the northern bank of the Beaver River. Some 5 miles (8.0 km) east across Utah State Route 21 is the village of Greenville, and the city of Beaver is about 9 miles (14 km) east.

== History ==
Adamsville was first settled in the spring of 1862 by David B. Adams and three other families, who established farms along the Beaver River. In 1866, residents were temporarily moved to Greenville for safety during the Black Hawk War, but the settlement continued to grow; in 1867 a townsite was surveyed and the town was named Adamsville. In 1868, a community meetinghouse was built. School was held in the building until around 1920. A post office was established on April 10, 1868. Previous names for the community were Beaver Creek Iron Works and Wales.
