= Birch Creek (Beaver County, Utah) =

- Birch Creek, a stream on the western slope of Birch Creek Mountain

Location
- Country: United States
- State: Utah

Physical characteristics
- Source: West slope of Birch Creek Mountain
  - location: Tushar Mountains, Beaver County, Utah
  - coordinates: 38°16′57″N 112°26′50″W
  - elevation: 9,405 ft (2,867 m)
- Mouth: South Creek
  - location: Southeast of Beaver, Beaver County, Utah
  - coordinates: 38°13′25″N 112°35′57″W
  - elevation: 6,194 ft (1,888 m)

Birch Creek is a northwesterly-flowing 8.4 miles (13.5 km) stream in Beaver County, Utah. It originates on the western slope of Birch Creek Mountain in the Tushar Mountains in Fishlake National Forest, and its waters flow west into South Creek, then under Interstate 15 south of the town of Beaver, and thence to the Beaver River, and ultimately to the Sevier River and Lake.

== Watershed and Course ==
Birch Creek begins as Middle Fork Birch Creek on the western slope of its namesake Birch Creek Mountain at elevation 9,405 feet (2,867 m) in the Tushar Mountains. Minor tributaries on Birch Creek Mountain include North Fork Birch Creek and South Fork Birch Creek.

== Ecology ==
Intensive grazing, historic extirpation of beaver (Castor canadensis), and conifer encroachment have all contributed to the degraded condition of Birch Creek. Birch Creek supports native Bonneville cutthroat trout (Oncorhynchus clarkii utah), a subspecies of cutthroat trout, a species of special concern in Utah and one of 14 or so recognized subspecies of cutthroat trout native to the western United States. It is the only native sport fish in southwestern Utah's Bonneville Basin. When prehistoric Lake Bonneville became desiccated 8,000 years ago, remnant populations of cutthroat trout persisted in coldwater streams on the western slope of the Tushar Mountains, in particular, Birch Creek and North Fork North Creek. Behnke used meristic analysis in 1976 to first describe Bonneville cutthroat trout in Birch Creek and this finding was later confirmed by several genetic analyses. Birch Creek acted as the source for the first restoration of Bonneville cutthroat trout in southern Utah when fish were transferred to Sam Stowe Creek in the Middle Sevier River drainage in 1977.

A restoration project using beaver dam analogues to restore riparian habitat and decrease channel incision was conducted by Professor Joe Wheaton and team from Utah State University in conjunction with the Bureau of Land Management.

== See also ==
- Beaver River (Utah)
- Fishlake National Forest
