= Cunningham Wash (Utah) =

Coordinates: 38.3352481°N 112.7191111°W

Cunningham Wash is a wash in eastern Beaver County, Utah, United States.

== Description ==
The wash begins north of Bearskin Mountain and runs southeast briefly before turning south to along the east side of the Mineral Mountains and empty into the Wildcat Creek, northwest of the city of Beaver.

Cunningham Wash derives its name from Cunningham Matthews, a local pioneer.

== See also ==
- Arroyo (creek)
- List of canyons and gorges in Utah
- List of rivers in Utah
