= Bradbury Canyon =

Bradbury Canyon may refer to:

- Bradbury Canyon, California, USA (34.1556°N 117.9667°W), of Los Angeles County, in the vicinity of the towns of Bradbury and Azusa, and site of the Bradbury Debris Basin
- Bradbury Canyon, Utah, USA (40.8541°N 111.4027°W), of Summit County, in the vicinity of the towns of Summit and Coalville
