= Cunningham Wash =

Cunningham Wash may refer to:

- Cunningham Wash (Arizona), see Butler Valley (Arizona)
- Cunningham Wash (Utah)
