= Rollins-Eyre House =

- U.S. National Register of Historic Places
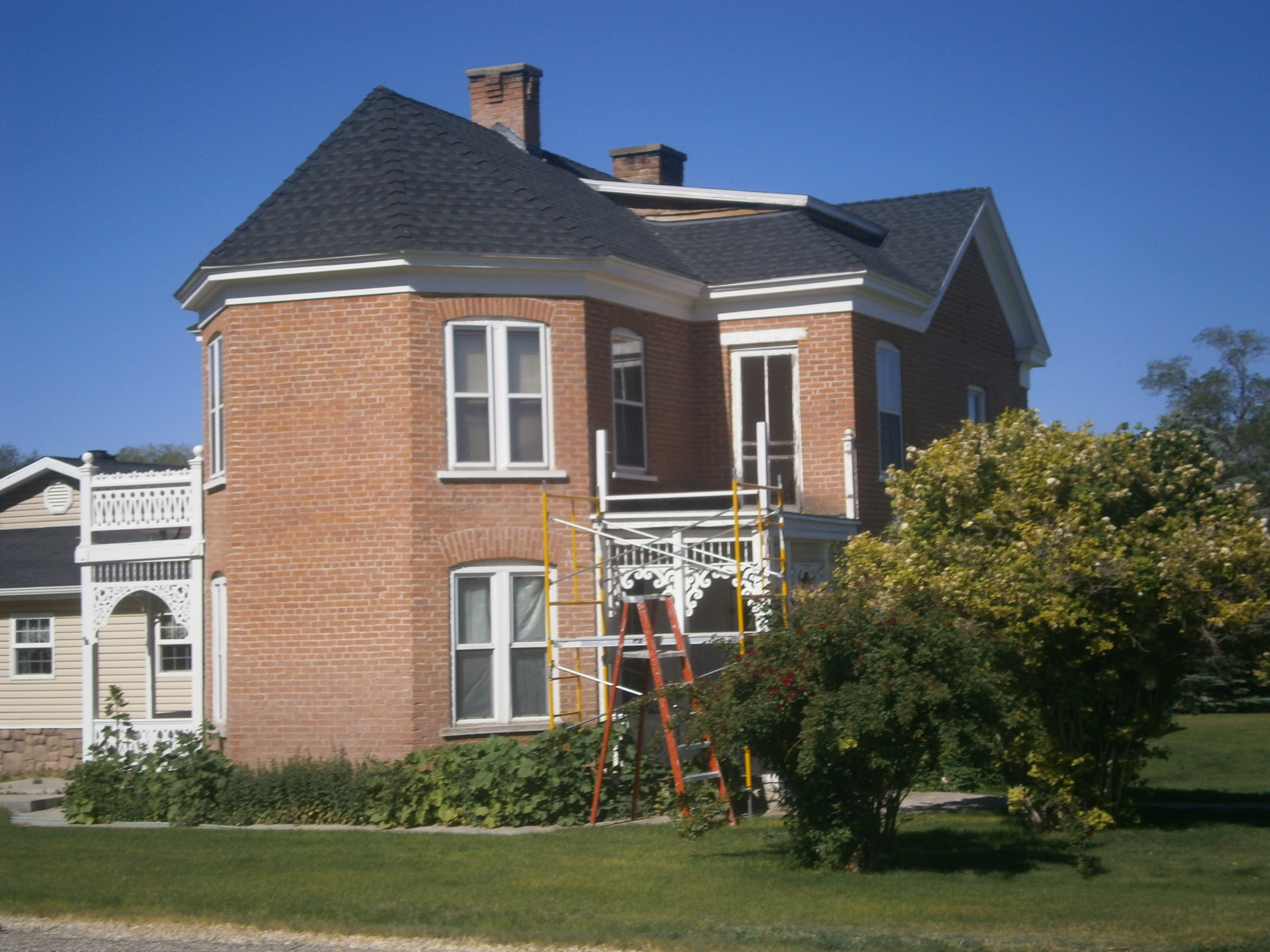

- Location within Utah
- Location: 113 W. Main, Minersville, Utah
- Coordinates: 38°12′47″N 112°55′41″W
- Area: 1.2 acres (0.49 ha)
- Built: c.1870, c.1890
- Architectural style: Late Victorian, Greek Revival
- NRHP reference No.: 94001626
- Added to NRHP: January 30, 1995

The Rollins-Eyre House, at 113 W. Main St. in Minersville, Utah, was listed on the National Register of Historic Places in 1995.

It is a two-story house which was built in two phases, in c.1870 and c.1890, both of red brick construction. The first phase was a Greek Revival-style central passage plan house; the second added a Victorian Eclectic extension.
