= Cunningham Hill, Utah =

Ghost town in Beaver County, Utah

Coordinates: 38°23′46″N 112°43′30″W

Cunningham Hill is a former town in Beaver County, Utah. The GNIS classifies it as a populated place.

The community bears the name of Cunningham Matthews, a pioneer who settled there.
