= Hamiltons Fort, Utah =

Unincorporated community in the state of Utah, United States

- Unincorporated community
- Location of Hamilton Fort within the State of Utah Hamilton Fort (the United States)
- Coordinates: 37°37′10″N 113°09′03″W
- Country: United States
- State: Utah
- County: Iron
- Elevation: 5,568 ft (1,697 m)
- Time zone: UTC-7 (Mountain (MST))
  - Summer (DST): UTC-6 (MDT)
- ZIP codes: 84753
- Area code: 435
- GNIS feature ID: 1454331

Hamiltons Fort is an unincorporated community in south-central Iron County, Utah, United States.

== Description ==
A post office called Hamiltons Fort was in operation between 1859 and 1913. Variant names were "Hamilton Fort", "Fort Hamilton", "Fort Hamblin", "Hamblin", "Hambleton", and "Hamilton". The community was named after John Hamilton, a pioneer settler.
