= Elk Mountain, Utah =

Eagle Point Ski Resort
- Location in Utah Eagle Point Ski Resort (the United States)
- Location: Beaver, Utah United States
- Nearest city: Beaver, Utah
- Coordinates: 38°19′14″N 112°23′30″W
- Trails: 41
- Lift system: 7
- Night skiing: limited
- Website: www.skieaglepoint.com

Elk Mountain, Utah refers to several things. Most recently, a ski resort near Beaver, Utah.

Elk Meadows Ski Area initially closed but reopened in December 2010 under new ownership and is now called Eagle Point Ski Resort. Eagle Point has added many new amenities, including restaurants, hot tubs, etc.

== Climate ==
There is a weather station below Eagle Point Ski Resort in the Merchant Creek Valley.

Climate data for Merchant Valley, Utah, 2004–2020 normals: 8703ft (2653m)
Month	Jan	Feb	Mar	Apr	May	Jun	Jul	Aug	Sep	Oct	Nov	Dec	Year
Record high °F (°C)	58 (14)	58 (14)	66 (19)	69 (21)	78 (26)	84 (29)	87 (31)	86 (30)	83 (28)	74 (23)	63 (17)	56 (13)	87 (31)
Mean maximum °F (°C)	51.2 (10.7)	50.8 (10.4)	57.5 (14.2)	62.9 (17.2)	70.4 (21.3)	79.5 (26.4)	82.7 (28.2)	78.9 (26.1)	75.1 (23.9)	65.9 (18.8)	59.1 (15.1)	50.8 (10.4)	83.2 (28.4)
Mean daily maximum °F (°C)	37.7 (3.2)	38.2 (3.4)	45.0 (7.2)	49.8 (9.9)	57.7 (14.3)	69.9 (21.1)	74.8 (23.8)	72.3 (22.4)	65.2 (18.4)	53.5 (11.9)	44.8 (7.1)	36.0 (2.2)	53.7 (12.1)
Daily mean °F (°C)	25.5 (−3.6)	25.9 (−3.4)	32.3 (0.2)	37.4 (3.0)	44.5 (6.9)	54.3 (12.4)	60.3 (15.7)	58.2 (14.6)	51.5 (10.8)	41.3 (5.2)	33.1 (0.6)	24.6 (−4.1)	40.7 (4.9)
Mean daily minimum °F (°C)	13.3 (−10.4)	13.5 (−10.3)	19.7 (−6.8)	25.0 (−3.9)	31.3 (−0.4)	38.7 (3.7)	45.7 (7.6)	44.2 (6.8)	37.8 (3.2)	29.0 (−1.7)	21.3 (−5.9)	13.2 (−10.4)	27.7 (−2.4)
Mean minimum °F (°C)	−7.1 (−21.7)	−6.1 (−21.2)	1.5 (−16.9)	11.7 (−11.3)	21.8 (−5.7)	29.0 (−1.7)	39.0 (3.9)	37.1 (2.8)	27.2 (−2.7)	13.9 (−10.1)	1.3 (−17.1)	−7.1 (−21.7)	−11.9 (−24.4)
Record low °F (°C)	−21 (−29)	−14 (−26)	−4 (−20)	6 (−14)	15 (−9)	15 (−9)	34 (1)	31 (−1)	18 (−8)	−4 (−20)	−13 (−25)	−16 (−27)	−21 (−29)
Average precipitation inches (mm)	2.86 (73)	2.92 (74)	2.95 (75)	2.91 (74)	2.11 (54)	1.01 (26)	1.86 (47)	2.28 (58)	1.89 (48)	2.23 (57)	2.13 (54)	2.84 (72)	27.99 (712)
Source 1: XMACIS2
Source 2: NOAA (Precipitation)
