= Sulphur Peak (Utah) =

Mountain in Utah, United States of America

Coordinates: 38°36′50″N 112°31′48″W

Sulphur Peak is a summit in the south end of the Pavant Range in Millard County, Utah. It reaches an elevation of 7,020 feet (2,140 m)
