= Minersville, Utah =

Town in the state of Utah, United States

- Town
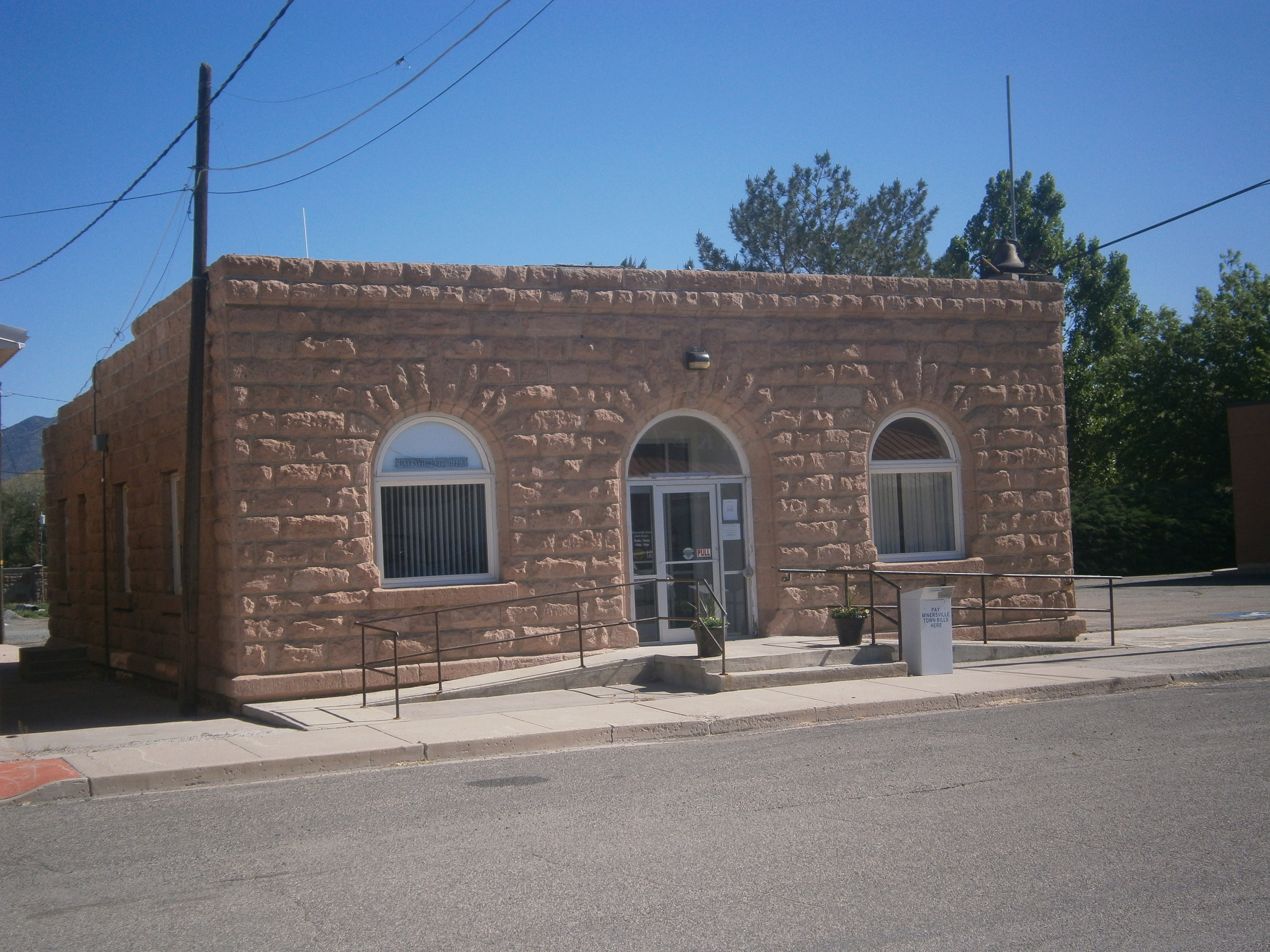
- Minersville Town Hall

- Seal

- Location in Beaver County and the State of Utah

- Location of Utah in the United States
- Coordinates: 38°15′05″N 112°59′20″W
- Country: United States
- State: Utah
- County: Beaver

Area
  - Total: 2.17 sq mi (5.63 km^{2})
  - Land: 2.17 sq mi (5.63 km^{2})
  - Water: 0 sq mi (0.00 km^{2})
- Elevation: 5,164 ft (1,574 m)

Population (2020)
  - Total: 807
  - Density: 371/sq mi (143/km^{2})
- Time zone: UTC-7 (Mountain (MST))
  - Summer (DST): UTC-6 (MDT)
- ZIP code: 84752
- Area code: 435
- FIPS code: 49-50590
- GNIS feature ID: 2413004
- Website: minersvilleut.gov

Minersville is a town in southeastern Beaver County, Utah, United States. The population was 807 at the 2020 census, down from the 2010 figure of 907.

== History ==
Minersville was settled in 1859 at the direction of Brigham Young so a lead mine could be operated on the site where Jesse N. Smith and three others had found lead the previous year.

Minersville had 446 residents in 1870, 525 in 1900 and in 1930 had 815 residents.

== Geography ==
Minersville is located in south-central Beaver County in mountain foothills northwest of the Black Mountains, southwest of the Mineral Mountains, and at the northeast perimeter of the Escalante Desert.

Utah State Route 21 runs through the northern side of the town, leading north 13 miles (21 km) to Milford and east 17 miles (27 km) to Beaver. Utah State Route 130 leads south from Minersville, 40 miles (64 km) to Cedar City.

According to the United States Census Bureau, the town has a total area of 0.66 square miles (1.7 km^{2}), all land.

=== Climate ===
The climate in this area has mild differences between highs and lows, and there is adequate rainfall year-round. According to the Köppen Climate Classification system, Minersville has a marine west coast climate, abbreviated "Cfb" on climate maps.

Historical population
Census	Pop.	Note	%±
1870	446		—
1880	487		9.2%
1890	463		−4.9%
1900	437		−5.6%
1910	591		35.2%
1920	675		14.2%
1930	537		−20.4%
1940	570		6.1%
1950	593		4.0%
1960	580		−2.2%
1970	448		−22.8%
1980	552		23.2%
1990	608		10.1%
2000	817		34.4%
2010	907		11.0%
2020	807		−11.0%
U.S. Decennial Census

== Demographics ==
As of the census of 2000, there were 817 people, 256 households, and 204 families residing in the town. The population density was 1,289.3 people per square mile (500.7/km^{2}). There were 274 housing units at an average density of 432.4 per square mile (167.9/km^{2}). The racial makeup of the town was 93.76% White, 0.12% Asian, 0.12% Pacific Islander, 4.16% from other races, and 1.84% from two or more races. Hispanic or Latino of any race were 6.00% of the population.

There were 256 households, out of which 49.2% had children under the age of 18 living with them, 73.0% were married couples living together, 5.1% had a female householder with no husband present, and 20.3% were non-families. 18.0% of all households were made up of individuals, and 11.7% had someone living alone who was 65 years of age or older. The average household size was 3.19 and the average family size was 3.68.

In the town, the age distribution of the population shows 39.0% under the age of 18, 10.2% from 18 to 24, 23.6% from 25 to 44, 14.4% from 45 to 64, and 12.7% who were 65 years of age or older. The median age was 26 years. For every 100 females, there were 109.5 males. For every 100 females age 18 and over, there were 100.8 males.

The median income for a household in the town was $36,563, and the median income for a family was $39,286. Males had a median income of $31,042 versus $15,179 for females. The per capita income for the town was $11,693. About 7.3% of families and 9.0% of the population were below the poverty line, including 11.3% of those under age 18 and 3.4% of those age 65 or over.

== See also ==
- Rollins-Eyre House
- List of cities and towns in Utah
