= Sulphurdale =

Sulphurdale, Utah
- Ghost town
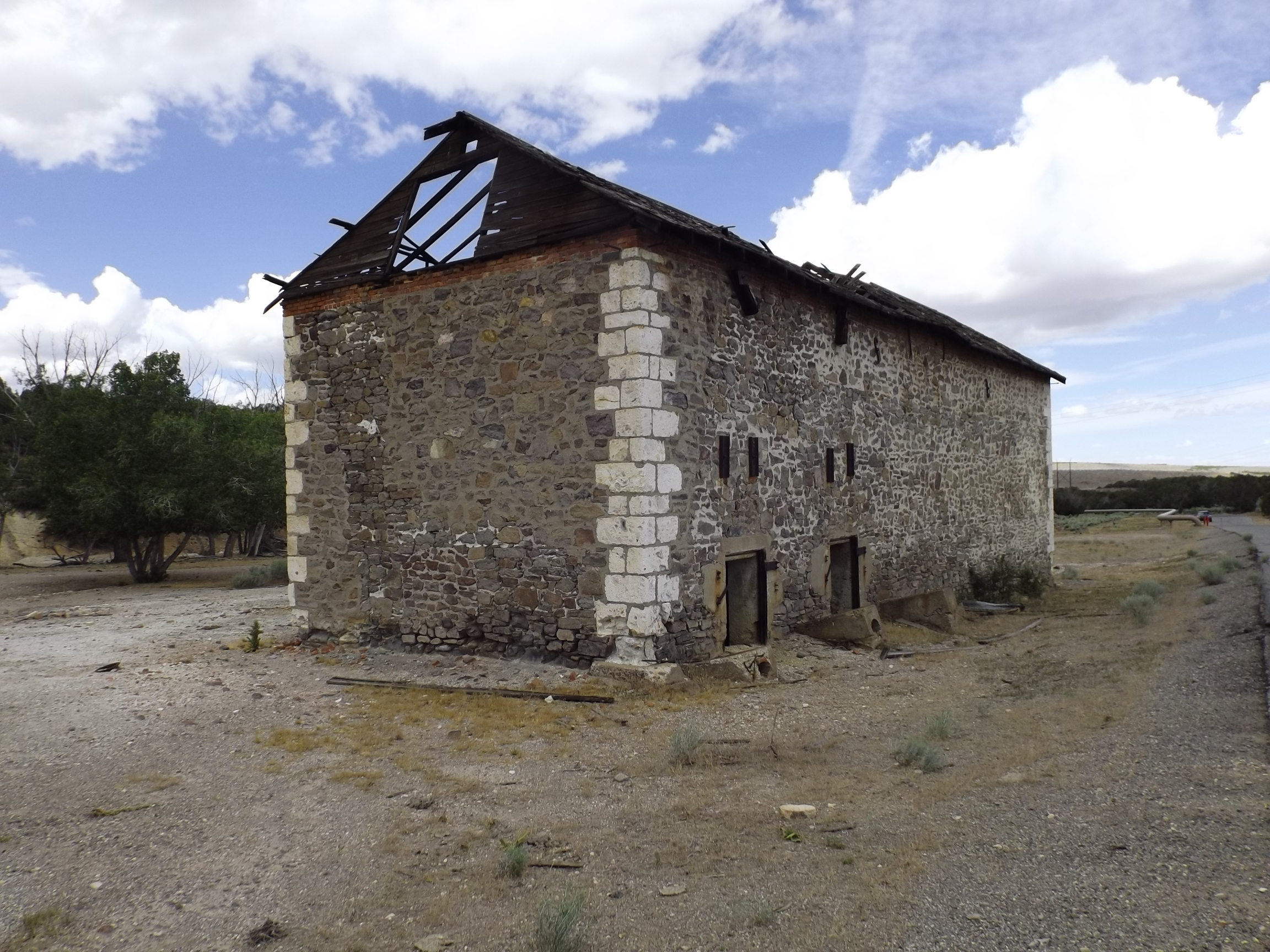
- The abandoned mine office in Sulphurdale

- Location within Utah Location within the United States
- Coordinates: 38°33′37″N 112°34′55″W
- Country: United States
- State: Utah
- County: Beaver
- Founded: 1883
- Abandoned: 1970s
- Named for: Sulfur
- Elevation: 6,214 ft (1,894 m)
- GNIS feature ID: 1446230

Sulphurdale is a ghost town in Beaver County, Utah, United States. Sulphurdale was established in 1870, but mining did not begin in large scale until 1883. Homes, a school, a store and company offices were built in town. Despite the heavy mining activity, high quality sulfur was difficult to find. Production slowed in the 1940s and 1950s, and in 1966, the mine and mill shut down. By the end of the 1970s, Sulphurdale was abandoned.

== History ==
The site that was to become Sulphurdale was surveyed by Charles Dickart, who discovered a large body of sulfur ore just south of Cove Fort in 1870. Minimal work was done until 1883, when a thermal plant was built to process the extracted sulfur. Steady production began in 1890. 1,000 tons of sulfur were produced annually for fifteen years. The mining company that operated the mines at Sulphurdale built 30 homes for the workers, a schoolhouse, a company store, and company offices. For a time, the town was unofficially known as Morrissey, after the operator of the mines. Twice every week, freighters hauled 20 tons of sulfur to the Union Pacific loading docks at Black Rock. Only the high grade ore was considered useful; the rest of the ore went unused.

Although the Sulphurdale mines were fully operational, very little sulfur was mined. A sulfur mill that was built in 1951 did not produce much high quality sulfur. Production began to slow down in the 1940s and 1950s. In 1961 the Sulphurdale Chemical Company built a mill and began commercial production in 1965; however, the company owner died in 1966 and the mill shut down. After seventy years of activity, the mines at Sulphurdale were closed. In 1985, a geothermal power system was installed near Sulphurdale, and the power system is currently in operation, producing electricity for Provo. The hydrothermal system it exploits is one of the largest in the western United States, with temperature anomalies of up to 200 °C (392 °F) per kilometer. The schoolhouse and a couple of homes remain in the town proper.

== See also ==
- List of ghost towns in Utah
