= Summit, Utah =

- Census-designated place
- Location in Iron County and the state of Utah
- Coordinates: 37°48′05″N 112°56′06″W
- Country: United States
- State: Utah
- County: Iron
- Settled: 1858

Area
  - Total: 0.69 sq mi (1.8 km^{2})
  - Land: 0.69 sq mi (1.8 km^{2})
  - Water: 0 sq mi (0.0 km^{2})
- Elevation: 5,994 ft (1,827 m)

Population (2020)
  - Total: 170
  - Density: 240/sq mi (94/km^{2})
- Time zone: UTC-7 (Mountain (MST))
  - Summer (DST): UTC-6 (MDT)
- ZIP code: 84772
- Area code: 435
- FIPS code: 49-74040
- GNIS feature ID: 2629954

Summit is an unincorporated community and census-designated place (CDP) in east-central Iron County, Utah, United States. The population was 170 at the 2020 census.

== History ==
Summit was named for the fact that it sits on the divide between the Parowan Valley and Cedar Valley.

At first the area around Summit Creek was a grazing area for Parowan to the north. In the spring of 1858, Samuel T. Orton and other families moved to Summit Creek and began farming and tending bees, sheep and cattle. By July 1877 an LDS ward was organized in Summit. Sylvanus C. Hulet was its first bishop. Originally educating their children in a one-room log schoolhouse, it was upgraded later to a concrete building, then from 1920 to 1936, to a two-room brick schoolhouse for students up to the seventh grade.

== Demographics ==
Historical population
Census	Pop.	Note	%±
2010	160		—
2020	170		6.3%

As of the census of 2010, there were 160 people living in the CDP. There were 79 housing units. The racial makeup of the town was 92.5% White, 3.1% American Indian and Alaska Native, 3.1% from some other race, and 1.3% from two or more races. Hispanic or Latino of any race were 8.1% of the population.

== Climate ==
The climate in this area has mild differences between highs and lows, and there is adequate rainfall year-round. According to the Köppen Climate Classification system, Summit has a marine west coast climate, abbreviated "Cfb" on climate maps.

== See also ==
- List of census-designated places in Utah
