= Milford, Utah =

City in Utah, United States

- City
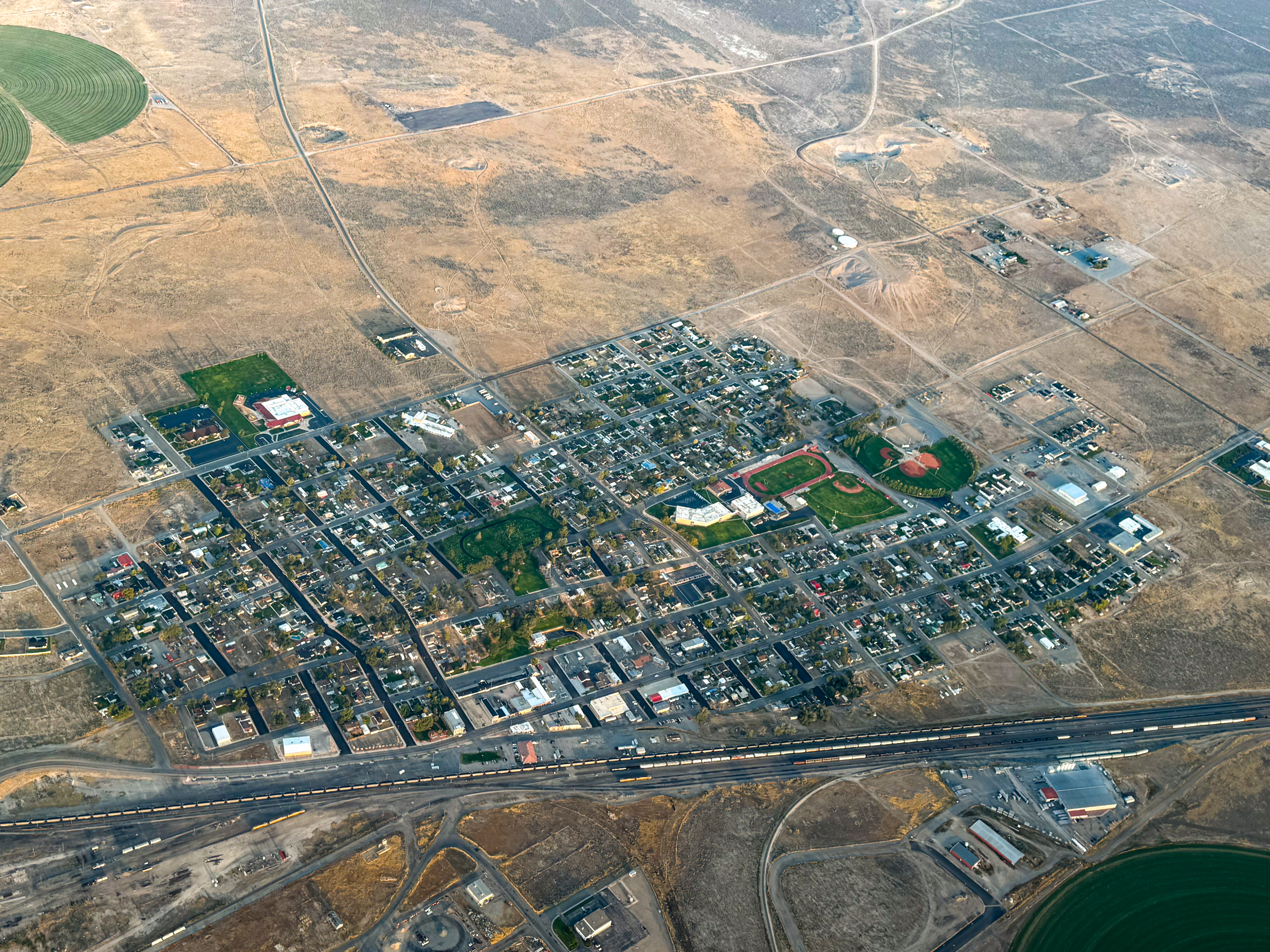
- Aerial view of Milford

- Seal

- Location in Beaver County and the state of Utah

- Location of Utah in the United States
- Coordinates: 38°23′31″N 113°00′22″W
- Country: United States
- State: Utah
- County: Beaver
- Founded: 1880
- Incorporated: 1903
- Founder: Arvin Stoddard

Government
  - Mayor: Nolan Davis

Area
  - Total: 2.14 sq mi (5.54 km^{2})
  - Land: 2.14 sq mi (5.54 km^{2})
  - Water: 0 sq mi (0.00 km^{2})
- Elevation: 4,961 ft (1,512 m)

Population (2020)
  - Total: 1,431
  - Density: 669/sq mi (258/km^{2})
- Time zone: UTC-7 (Mountain (MST))
  - Summer (DST): UTC-6 (MDT)
- ZIP code: 84751
- Area code: 435
- FIPS code: 49-50040
- GNIS feature ID: 2411106
- Website: www.milfordcityutah.com

Milford is a city in Beaver County, Utah, United States. The population was 1,431 at the 2020 census, up from the 2010 figure of 1,409.

== History ==
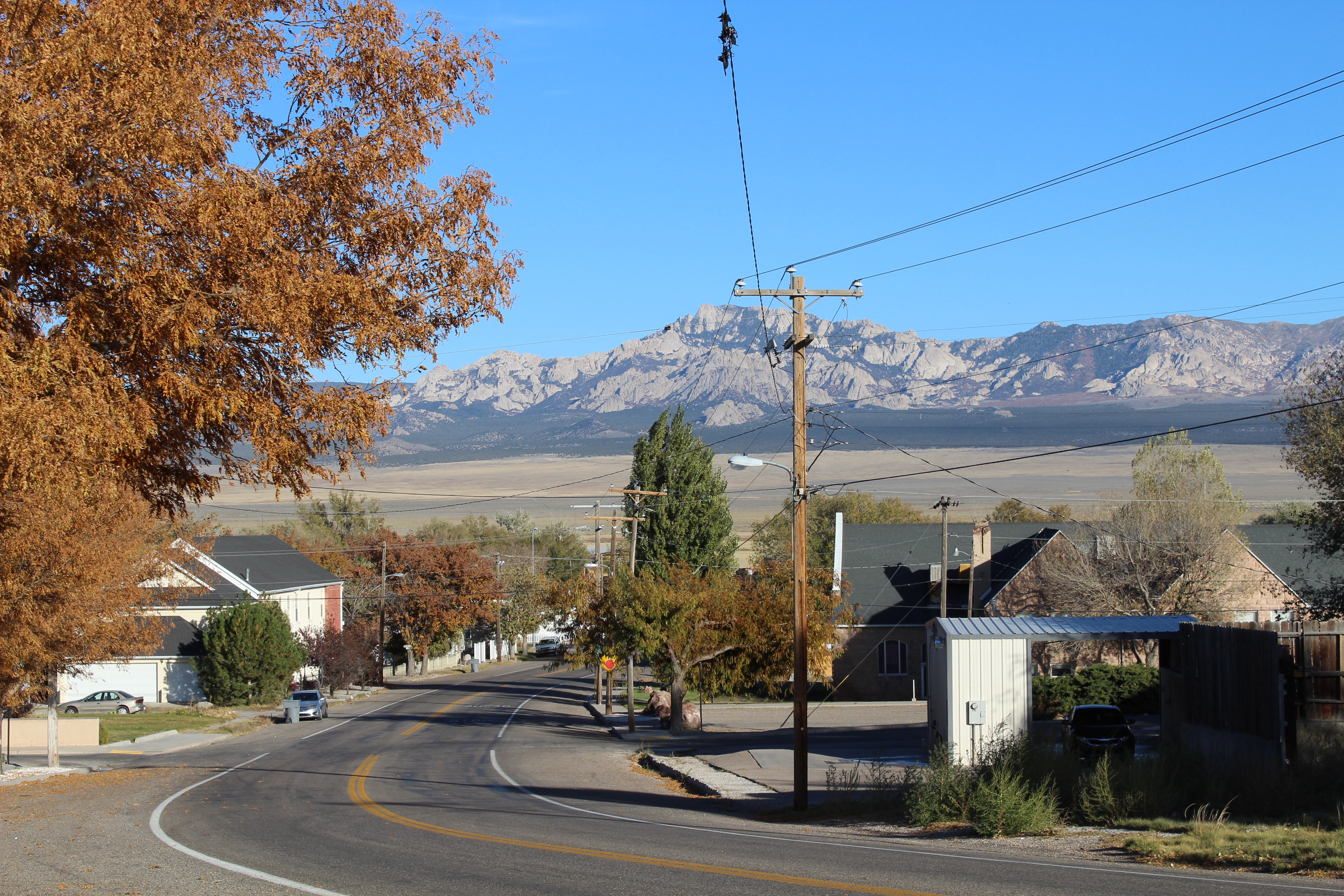
Facing east along West Center Street (SR-21), October 2017

Although settlers had established ranches in the area in the 1870s, Milford was not developed until after construction of the San Pedro, Los Angeles and Salt Lake Railroad, which established a station here in 1880. In that year, Arvin Stoddard moved here and surveyed a townsite. Milford is a constructed name, formed from mill and ford.

During the Great Depression, workers from a nearby Civilian Conservation Corps camp constructed a road from Milford to Beaver, to improve connections.

== Milford Flat Wildfire ==
Lightning caused a massive wildfire to start near Milford at 3:45 p.m. Friday, July 6, 2007. On July 8 the fire was declared the largest in Utah's history, having burned more than 283,000 acres (1,150 km^{2}).

== Demographics ==
Historical population
Census	Pop.	Note	%±
1890	576		—
1900	176		−69.4%
1910	1,014		476.1%
1920	1,308		29.0%
1930	1,517		16.0%
1940	1,393		−8.2%
1950	1,673		20.1%
1960	1,471		−12.1%
1970	1,304		−11.4%
1980	1,293		−0.8%
1990	1,107		−14.4%
2000	1,451		31.1%
2010	1,409		−2.9%
2020	1,431		1.6%
U.S. Decennial Census

=== Racial and ethnic composition ===
Racial composition as of the 2020 census
Race	Number	Percent
White	1,055	73.7%
Black or African American	0	0.0%
American Indian and Alaska Native	39	2.7%
Asian	7	0.5%
Native Hawaiian and Other Pacific Islander	6	0.4%
Some other race	237	16.6%
Two or more races	87	6.1%
Hispanic or Latino (of any race)	353	24.7%

=== 2020 census ===
As of the 2020 census, Milford had a population of 1,431 and a median age of 33.1 years. 31.1% of residents were under the age of 18, 13.1% of residents were 65 years of age or older, for every 100 females there were 110.1 males, and for every 100 females age 18 and over there were 108.5 males.

0.0% of residents lived in urban areas, while 100.0% lived in rural areas.

There were 475 households in Milford, of which 44.4% had children under the age of 18 living in them. Of all households, 58.7% were married-couple households, 18.9% were households with a male householder and no spouse or partner present, and 17.7% were households with a female householder and no spouse or partner present. About 20.6% of all households were made up of individuals and 10.5% had someone living alone who was 65 years of age or older.

There were 592 housing units, of which 19.8% were vacant. The homeowner vacancy rate was 4.3% and the rental vacancy rate was 23.8%.

=== 2000 census ===
As of the 2000 census, there were 1,451 people, 484 households, and 357 families residing in the city. The population density was 753.7 people per square mile (290.3/km^{2}). There were 589 housing units at an average density of 306.0 per square mile (117.8/km^{2}). The racial makeup of the city was 90.42% White, 1.45% Native American, 1.45% Asian, 4.07% from other races, and 2.62% from two or more races. Hispanic or Latino of any race were 6.13% of the population.

There were 484 households, out of which 45.0% had children under the age of 18 living with them, 61.0% were married couples living together, 9.3% had a female householder with no husband present, and 26.2% were non-families. 24.0% of all households were made up of individuals, and 14.7% had someone living alone who was 65 years of age or older. The average household size was 2.95 and the average family size was 3.58.

In the city, the population was spread out, with 37.2% under the age of 18, 9.7% from 18 to 24, 23.6% from 25 to 44, 17.2% from 45 to 64, and 12.3% who were 65 years of age or older. The median age was 28 years. For every 100 females, there were 97.4 males. For every 100 females age 18 and over, there were 95.1 males.

The median income for a household in the city was $35,809, and the median income for a family was $41,750. Males had a median income of $35,568 versus $19,000 for females. The per capita income for the city was $14,889. About 9.2% of families and 10.8% of the population were below the poverty line, including 11.1% of those under age 18 and 17.4% of those age 65 or over.

== Geography ==
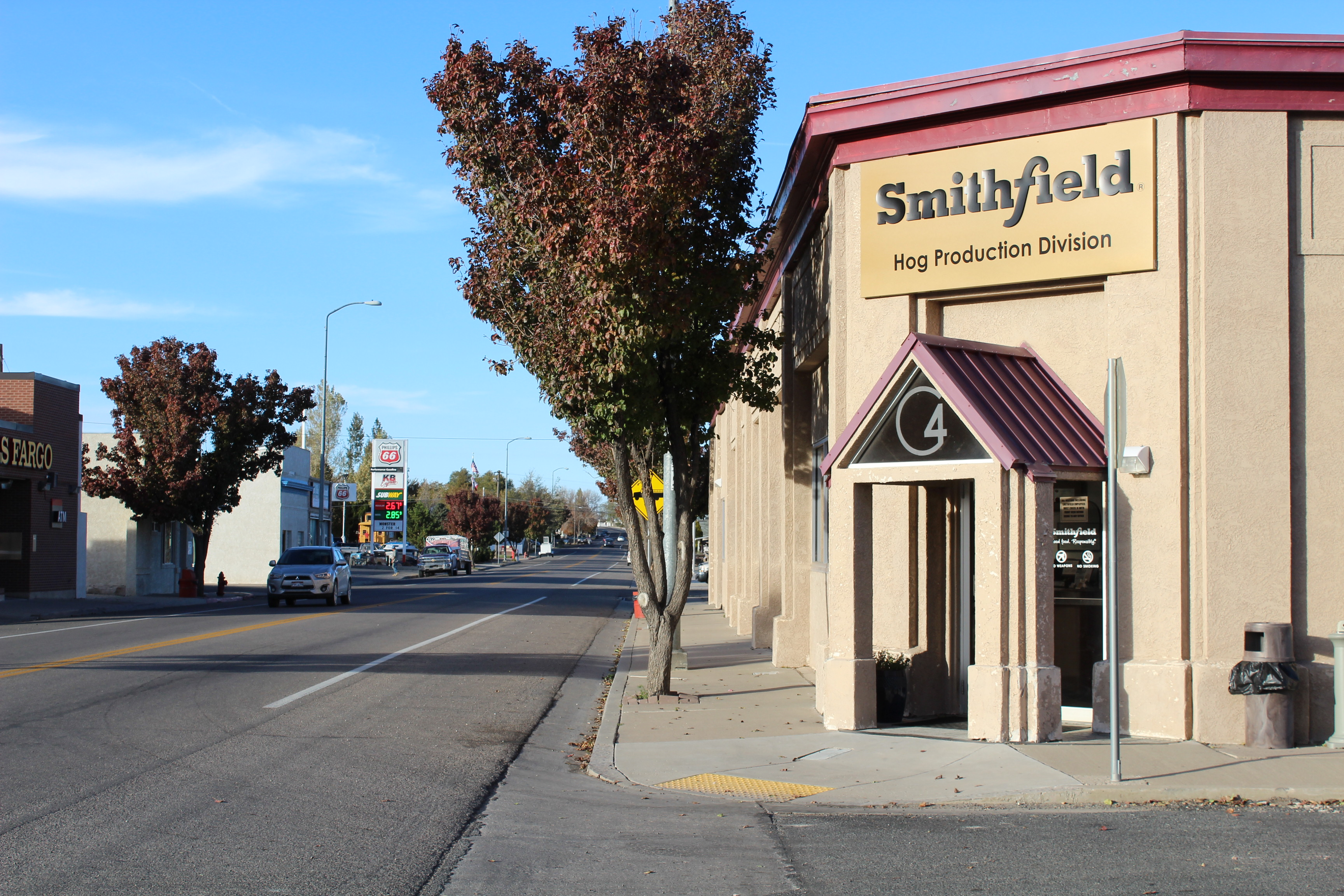
Looking north on South Main Street (SR-21), October 2017

Milford is located in east-central Beaver County in the Escalante Desert, a basin situated between the Mineral Mountains to the east and the smaller Star Range to the west. State Route 21 passes through the city, leading south 14 miles (23 km) to Minersville and northwest 84 miles (135 km) to U.S. Routes 6 and 50 near the Nevada line. State Route 257 runs north from Milford 74 miles (119 km) to Delta.

According to the United States Census Bureau, the city has a total area of 3.1 square miles (8.0 km^{2}), all land.

About 12 miles northeast of Milford, in Beaver County, Fervo Energy is developing Cape Station, a geothermal power project with a planned capacity of 500 MW. The project began delivering electricity to the grid on September 24, 2026, and its first 33 MW generating unit reached commercial operation on September 30, 2026. The first phase is planned to comprise approximately 100 MW, with a further 400 MW under development for a later phase.

=== Climate ===
Milford has a semi-arid climate (Köppen BSk).

Climate data for Milford, Utah (Milford Sound Airport), 1991–2020 normals, extremes 1928–2005
Month	Jan	Feb	Mar	Apr	May	Jun	Jul	Aug	Sep	Oct	Nov	Dec	Year
Record high °F (°C)	69 (21)	75 (24)	88 (31)	87 (31)	97 (36)	105 (41)	107 (42)	103 (39)	102 (39)	90 (32)	78 (26)	66 (19)	107 (42)
Mean maximum °F (°C)	53.4 (11.9)	61.2 (16.2)	71.3 (21.8)	79.3 (26.3)	87.8 (31.0)	96.7 (35.9)	100.5 (38.1)	98.4 (36.9)	92.6 (33.7)	82.1 (27.8)	69.0 (20.6)	57.6 (14.2)	100.7 (38.2)
Mean daily maximum °F (°C)	40.8 (4.9)	46.6 (8.1)	57.5 (14.2)	64.5 (18.1)	75.5 (24.2)	87.9 (31.1)	95.0 (35.0)	92.8 (33.8)	82.9 (28.3)	68.1 (20.1)	53.2 (11.8)	40.9 (4.9)	67.1 (19.5)
Daily mean °F (°C)	29.5 (−1.4)	34.3 (1.3)	42.9 (6.1)	48.9 (9.4)	58.5 (14.7)	69.1 (20.6)	77.0 (25.0)	75.3 (24.1)	65.2 (18.4)	51.4 (10.8)	38.8 (3.8)	28.9 (−1.7)	51.7 (10.9)
Mean daily minimum °F (°C)	18.1 (−7.7)	22.0 (−5.6)	28.3 (−2.1)	33.4 (0.8)	41.5 (5.3)	50.2 (10.1)	59.1 (15.1)	57.9 (14.4)	47.4 (8.6)	34.7 (1.5)	24.4 (−4.2)	16.8 (−8.4)	36.2 (2.3)
Mean minimum °F (°C)	−8.9 (−22.7)	−0.9 (−18.3)	9.2 (−12.7)	18.6 (−7.4)	26.2 (−3.2)	34.7 (1.5)	44.8 (7.1)	43.0 (6.1)	29.8 (−1.2)	19.1 (−7.2)	4.4 (−15.3)	−5.5 (−20.8)	−13.7 (−25.4)
Record low °F (°C)	−34 (−37)	−29 (−34)	−14 (−26)	9 (−13)	17 (−8)	24 (−4)	34 (1)	30 (−1)	23 (−5)	−20 (−29)	−13 (−25)	−35 (−37)	−35 (−37)
Average precipitation inches (mm)	0.60 (15)	0.65 (17)	1.01 (26)	0.76 (19)	0.90 (23)	0.45 (11)	0.70 (18)	0.56 (14)	0.72 (18)	1.09 (28)	0.53 (13)	0.70 (18)	8.67 (220)
Average snowfall inches (cm)	6.8 (17)	6.6 (17)	8.9 (23)	3.5 (8.9)	0.6 (1.5)	0.0 (0.0)	0.0 (0.0)	0.0 (0.0)	0.1 (0.25)	1.3 (3.3)	4.2 (11)	8.4 (21)	40.4 (102.95)
Average precipitation days (≥ 0.01 in)	5.9	6.4	6.6	6.8	5.8	2.6	6.8	6.2	4.7	5.1	4.9	7.1	68.9
Average snowy days (≥ 0.1 in)	3.1	2.4	3.2	1.3	0.5	0.0	0.0	0.0	0.1	0.8	1.4	3.0	15.8
Source 1: WRCC (mean maxima and minima 1928–2005)
Source 2: NOAA(September record)

== Recreation ==
Milford has a seasonal swimming pool, a five-hole golf course, lighted ball fields, a pavilion and a rodeo arena
The American Discovery Trail runs through Milford

== Historic photo gallery ==
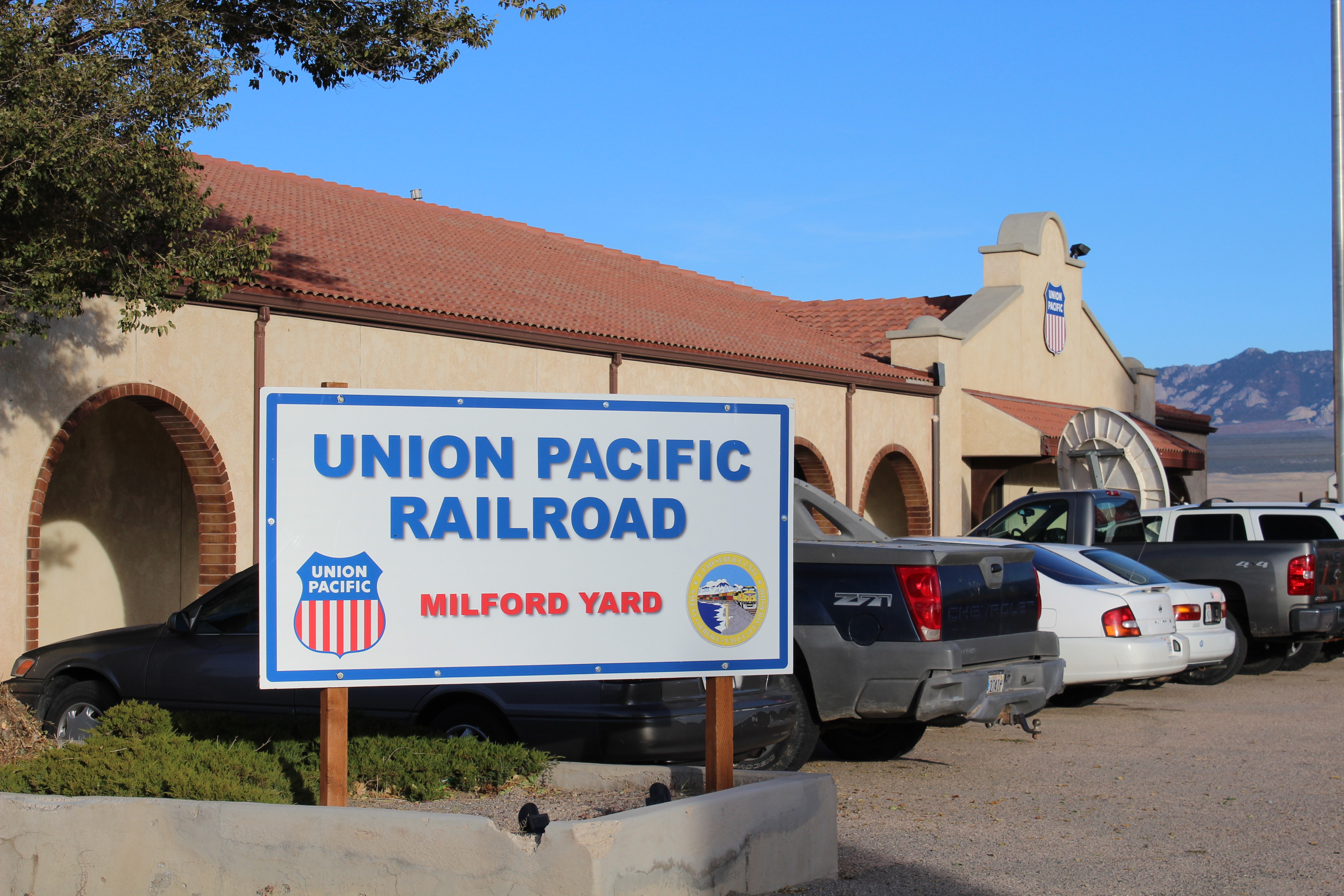
Milford train station, October 2017

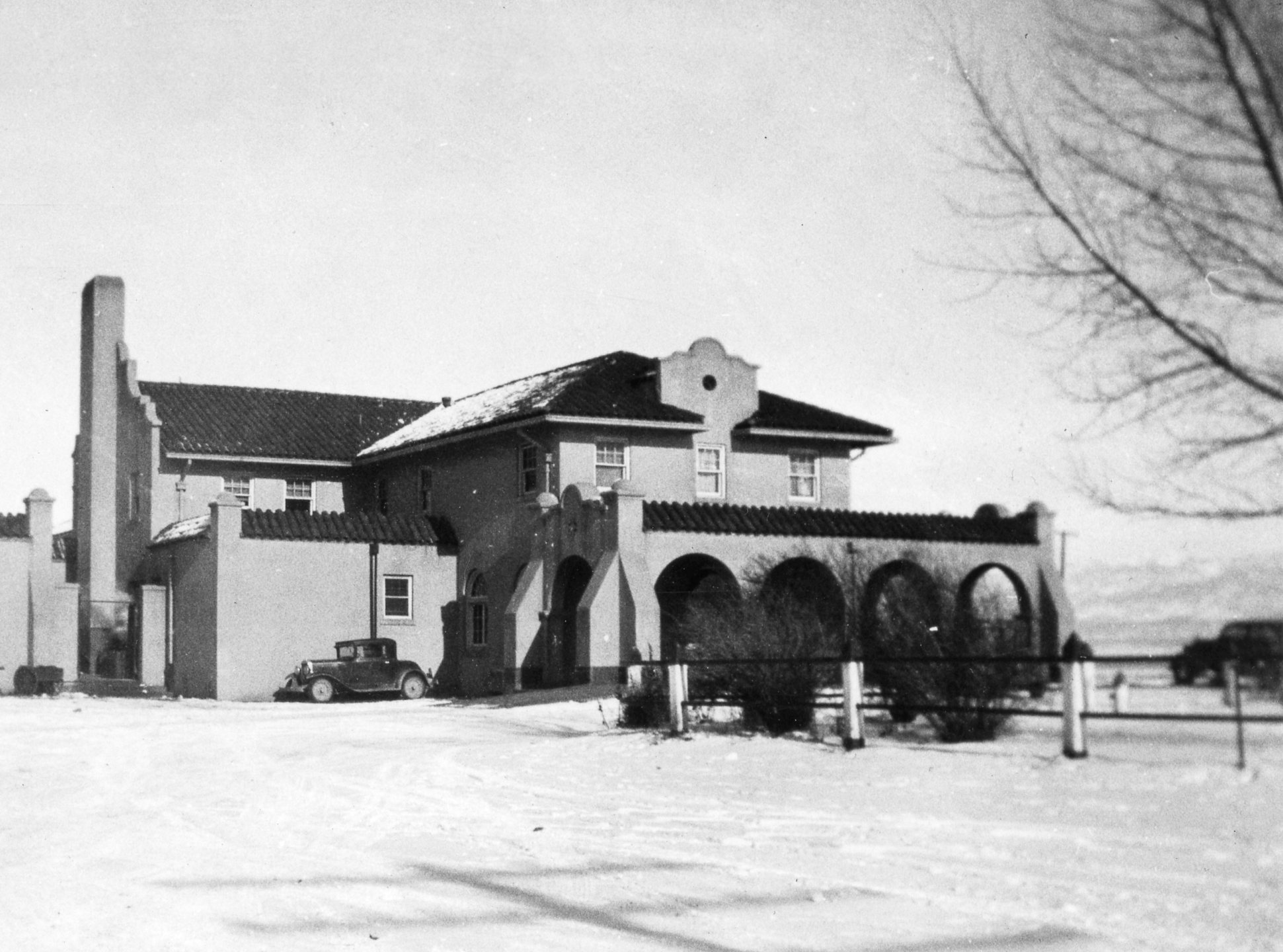
Train depot in Milford, Utah, during the winter of 1936–1937

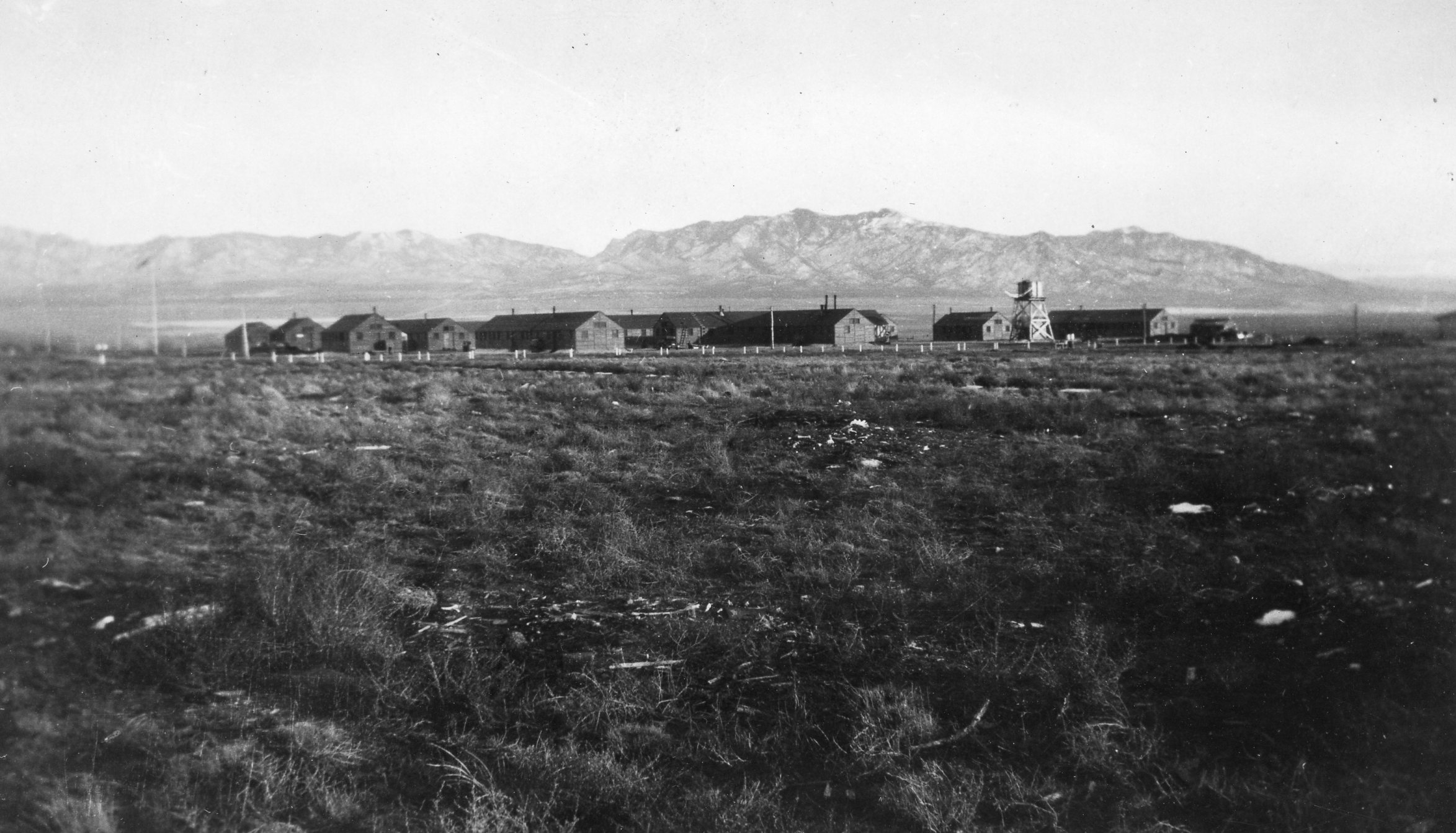
Civilian Conservation Corp camp at Milford, Utah

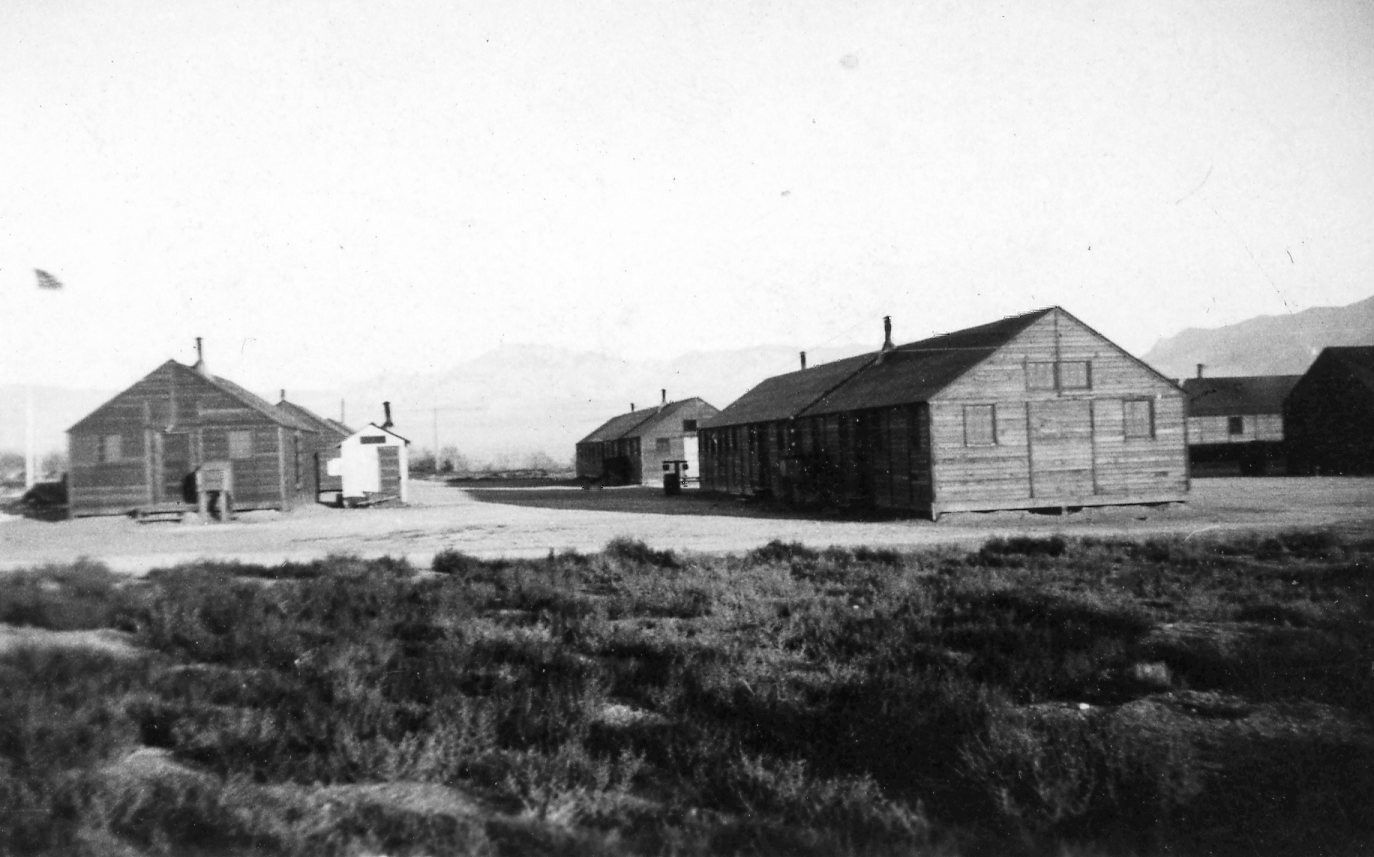
Barracks at CCC camp 2530

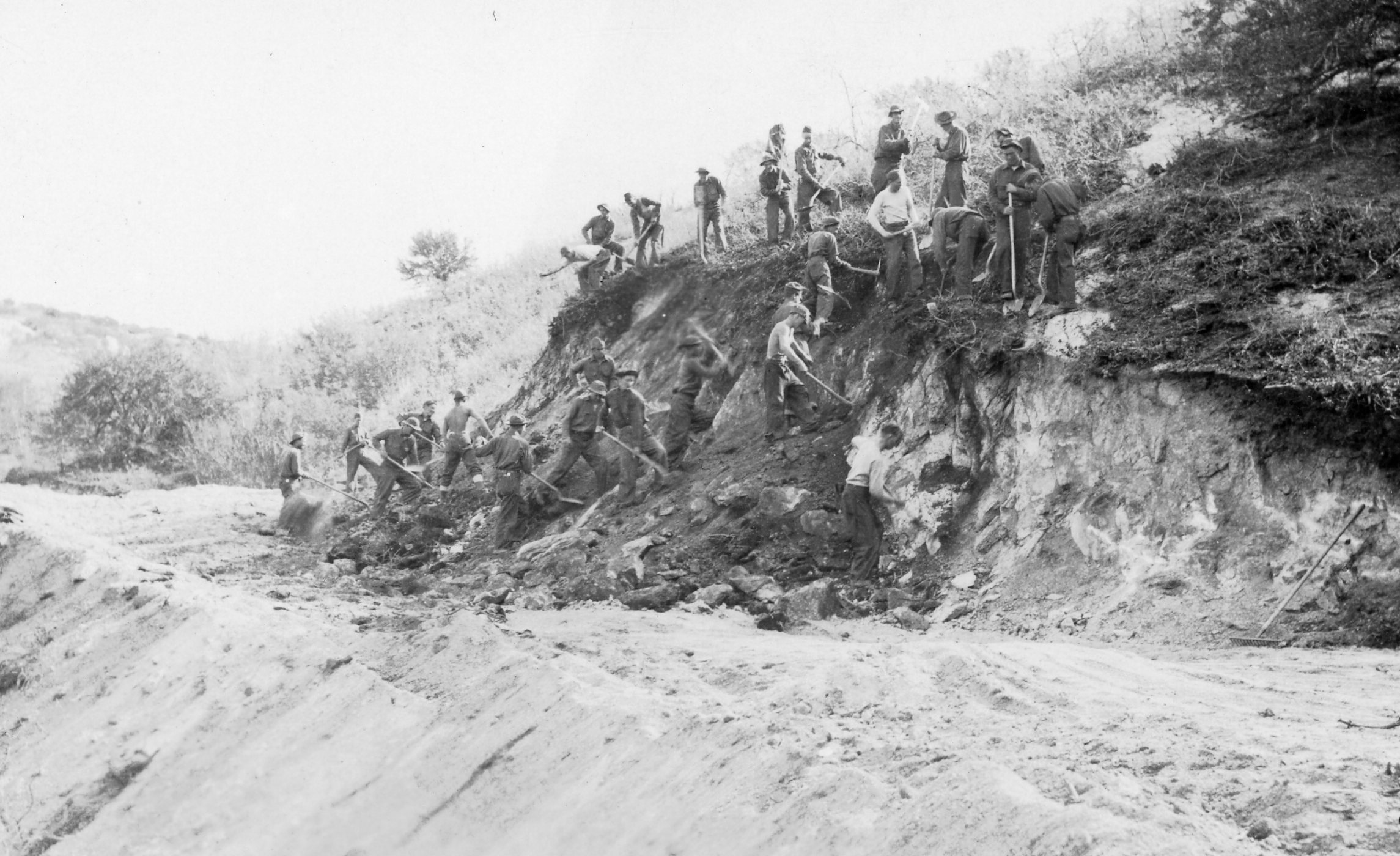
CCC workers with picks and shovels building road in Utah between Milford and Beaver

== See also ==
- List of cities and towns in Utah
