= Minersville Reservoir =

Reservoir in the state of Utah, United States

- Location within Utah Location within the United States
- Location: Beaver County, Utah
- Coordinates: 38°14′08″N 112°48′48″W
- Type: Reservoir
- Primary inflows: Beaver River, Indian Creek, Chalk Hollow Creek
- Primary outflows: Beaver River
- Basin countries: United States
- Max. length: 5.4 mi (8.7 km)
- Max. width: 1.15 mi (1.85 km)
- Surface area: 400.6 acres (162.1 ha)
- Average depth: 26.7 ft (8.1 m)
- Max. depth: 44 ft (13 m)
- Water volume: 32,687,800 m^{3} (26,500.4 acre⋅ft)
- Surface elevation: 5,500 ft (1,700 m)

Minersville Reservoir is a reservoir in Beaver County, Utah, United States.

== History ==
Minersville Reservoir was created in 1914 by the construction of the Rocky Ford dam, an Embankment dam to impound water from the Beaver River which heads in the Tushar Mountains for use in agriculture.

== Geography ==
Minersville Reservoir is located 12 mi (19 km) west of Beaver, Utah and 6 mi (9.7 km) east of Minersville. The shoreline consists of some private land, but is mostly public BLM-administered land.

== Activities ==
The reservoir is popular for year-round fishing, camping, boating, waterskiing, and tubing.
