= Greenville, Utah =

Unincorporated community in the state of Utah, United States

- Unincorporated community
- Location of Greeenville within the State of Utah
- Coordinates: 38°15′16″N 112°42′45″W
- Country: United States
- State: Utah
- County: Beaver
- Settled: 1861
- Founded by: Samuel Edwards
- Named after: Green pastures
- Elevation: 5,666 ft (1,727 m)
- Time zone: UTC-7 (Mountain (MST))
  - Summer (DST): UTC-6 (MDT)
- ZIP codes: 84731
- Area code: 435
- GNIS feature ID: 1428406

Greenville is an unincorporated community in eastern Beaver County, Utah, United States.

Historical population
| Census | Pop. | Note | %± |
|---|---|---|---|
| 1870 | 175 | | — |
| 1880 | 214 | | 22.3% |
| 1890 | 209 | | −2.3% |
| 1900 | 215 | | 2.9% |
| 1910 | 252 | | 17.2% |
| 1920 | 247 | | −2.0% |
| 1930 | 179 | | −27.5% |
| 1940 | 172 | | −3.9% |
| 1950 | 128 | | −25.6% |
Source: U.S. Census Bureau

== Description ==
The community lies along State Route 21 southwest of the city of Beaver (the county seat of Beaver County). Its elevation is 5,666 feet (1,727 m). Although Greenville is unincorporated, it has a post office, with the ZIP code of 84731.

== History ==
The location of Greenville was originally a camp on the north side of a ford on the Beaver River, along the Mormon Road until 1855. That year, the road was rerouted up river to the crossing at what later became Beaver. Greenville was first settled in 1861. The community was named for the thick green grass which covered the original town site.
