= Beaver River (Utah) =

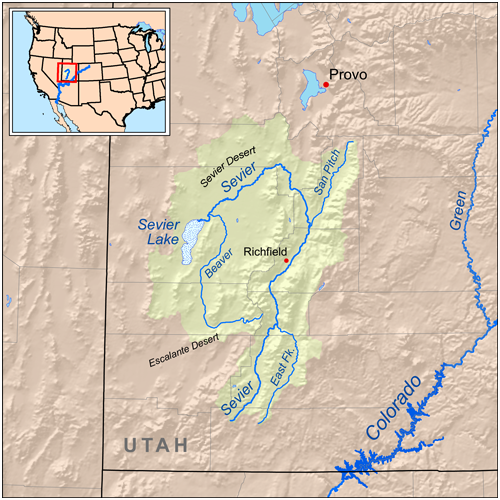
- Map of the Sevier River system, including the Beaver River

Location
- Country: United States
- State: Utah

Physical characteristics
- Source: Confluence of South and East Forks
  - location: Tushar Mountains, Beaver County
  - coordinates: 38°16′57″N 112°26′50″W
  - elevation: 7,142 ft (2,177 m)
- Mouth: Sevier River
  - location: near Delta, Millard County
  - coordinates: 39°09′11″N 112°50′06″W
  - elevation: 4,557 ft (1,389 m)
- Length: 110 mi (180 km)
- Basin size: 2,466 sq mi (6,390 km^{2})
- Discharge
  - location: Beaver
  - average: 51.5 cu ft/s (1.46 m^{3}/s)
  - minimum: 7.2 cu ft/s (0.20 m^{3}/s)
  - maximum: 1,080 cu ft/s (31 m^{3}/s)

Basin features
- Tributaries
  - left: South Fork Beaver River, South Creek (Beaver River)
  - right: East Fork Beaver River, North Creek (Beaver River), Indian Creek (Beaver River), Cove Creek

The Beaver River is a river in western Utah, 110 miles (180 km) long, that drains to Sevier Lake via the Sevier River.

== Description ==
The river starts in the Tushar Mountains, in eastern Beaver County near the town of Beaver, and flows for about 30 miles (48 km) west as a perennial stream, through the Beaver Valley to the Escalante Desert, where it turns north. The river then continues north for about 80 miles (130 km) as an ephemeral wash, past Milford (where its entire flow is diverted for irrigation) into Millard County. Once it reaches the Sevier Desert south of Delta it turns west, joining the Sevier River and emptying into the intermittent, endorheic Sevier Lake.

The Beaver River watershed drains about 2,466 square miles (6,390 km^{2}), most of it desert. The human population is about 3500, mostly concentrated in the town of Beaver. The river is dammed for irrigation in its upper reaches by Rocky Ford Dam, forming Minersville Reservoir. A total of 84,000 acres (34,000 ha) are farmed in the basin.

== See also ==
- List of rivers of Utah
