= Escalante Desert =

Desert in Utah, USA

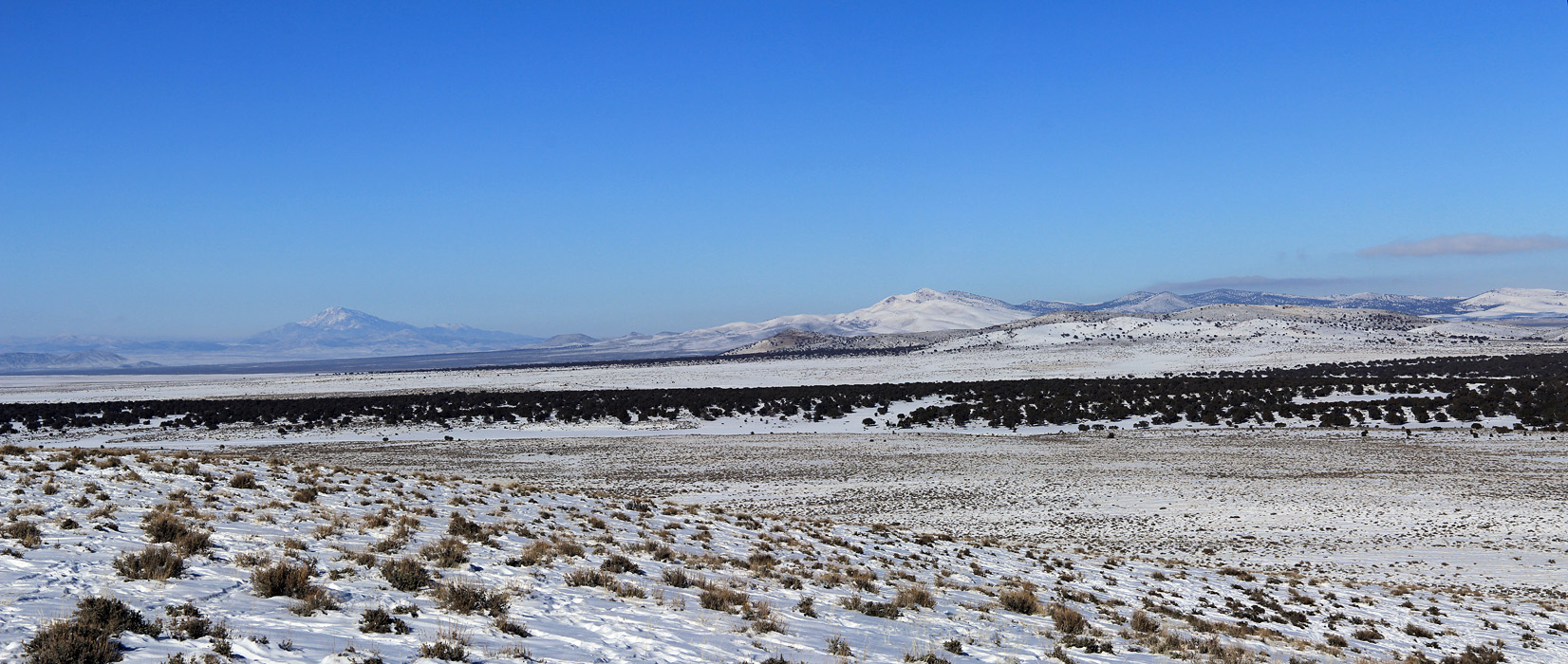
- Escalante Desert looking southwest from the Lund Highway

- Location within Utah
- Area: 3,270 mi^{2} (8,500 km^{2})

Geography
- Country: United States
- State: Utah
- County: Iron
- Coordinates: 37.92°N 113.5°W
- Interactive map of Escalante Desert

The Escalante Desert is a geographic Great Basin region and arid desert ecoregion, in the deserts and xeric shrublands biome, located in southwestern Utah.

== History ==
The Escalate Desert is located on the ancestral land of the Southern Paiute people. From ~300-1300 CE, the area was also home to the pre-Columbian Fremont culture.

In 1911 and again in 1914, large areas of the Escalante were opened for homesteading, and the area almost completely claimed by the end of 1915. Initially drawn by the hope of wealth and rich harvests, the majority of dryland farmers in the area saw multiple years of failed harvests. These failures were largely due to damage from feral horses, jackrabbits, and ranged livestock, combined with poor soil quality and drought. After fulfilling the government obligated homestead term, many settlers left the region to seek work elsewhere and by the 1920s, few of the initial homesteading families remained.

== Geography ==
The Escalante Desert is northwest of Cedar City in Iron County, Utah, and extends into part of Millard County. It is a high desert, with elevations predominantly between 5,000-5,500 feet (1,524-1,676 meters). The region spans over 1,200 square miles, covering most of Iron County, which annually has 13 inches (330 mm) rainfall and 5.9 feet (1.8 m) snowfall. The Escalante region also lies primarily between State Route 56 and Route 21, as well as north and west of Interstate 15.

From the Escalante Desert region's peripheral ridges, the elevation slowly declines to Lund Flats (38°01′19″N 113°26′20″W), which has railroad tracks between Milford and Lund.

== Flora and Fauna ==
Just like its parent Great Basin desert, the Escalante contains multiple biological communities, including shadscale zones, grasslands, sagebrush zones, and pinyon-juniper zones.

=== Mammals ===
Common Great Basin mammals can also be found in the Escalante Desert, such as the pronghorn, black-tailed jackrabbit, and coyote.

==== Rodents ====
The Escalate is home to a diverse group of desert rodents. Common species include: the chisel-toothed kangaroo rat, Ord's kangaroo rat, banner-tailed kangaroo rat, desert woodrat, dark kangaroo mouse, long-tailed pocket mouse, Great Basin pocket mouse, little pocket mouse, eastern deer mouse, brush mouse, northern grasshopper mouse, cliff chipmunk, and the white-tailed antelope squirrel. While rodents are found in all biological communities, they are most abundant in the pinyon-juniper and shadscale zones. Notably, the Escalate desert and Iron county are the home of the endangered Utah prairie dog. Of the 4 species of prairie dog found in the United States, the Utah prairie dog has the smallest range, which has been shrinking due to habitat loss.

=== Reptiles ===
Lizards are most abundant in grassland areas in the Escalante, and common species include: the long-nosed leopard lizard, western fence lizard, sagebrush lizard, common side-blotched lizard, desert horned lizard, pygmy short-horned lizard, and the western whiptail. Snakes are also found in the area, including the striped whipsnake.

=== Birds ===
While birds are also most abundant in grassland areas of the Escalante desert, the highest level of species diversity is seen in the pinyon-juniper zone. Common species include: the horned lark, black-throated sparrow, Bell's sparrow, Brewer's sparrow, mourning dove, loggerhead shrike, sage thrasher, and northern mockingbird.

== Subsidence ==
Near Beryl Junction (37°42′34″N 113°39′22″W) are 3 fissures formed by suspected groundwater-related subsidence caused by groundwater extraction for agricultural irrigation.
