= Beaver County, Utah =

County in Utah, United States

- County
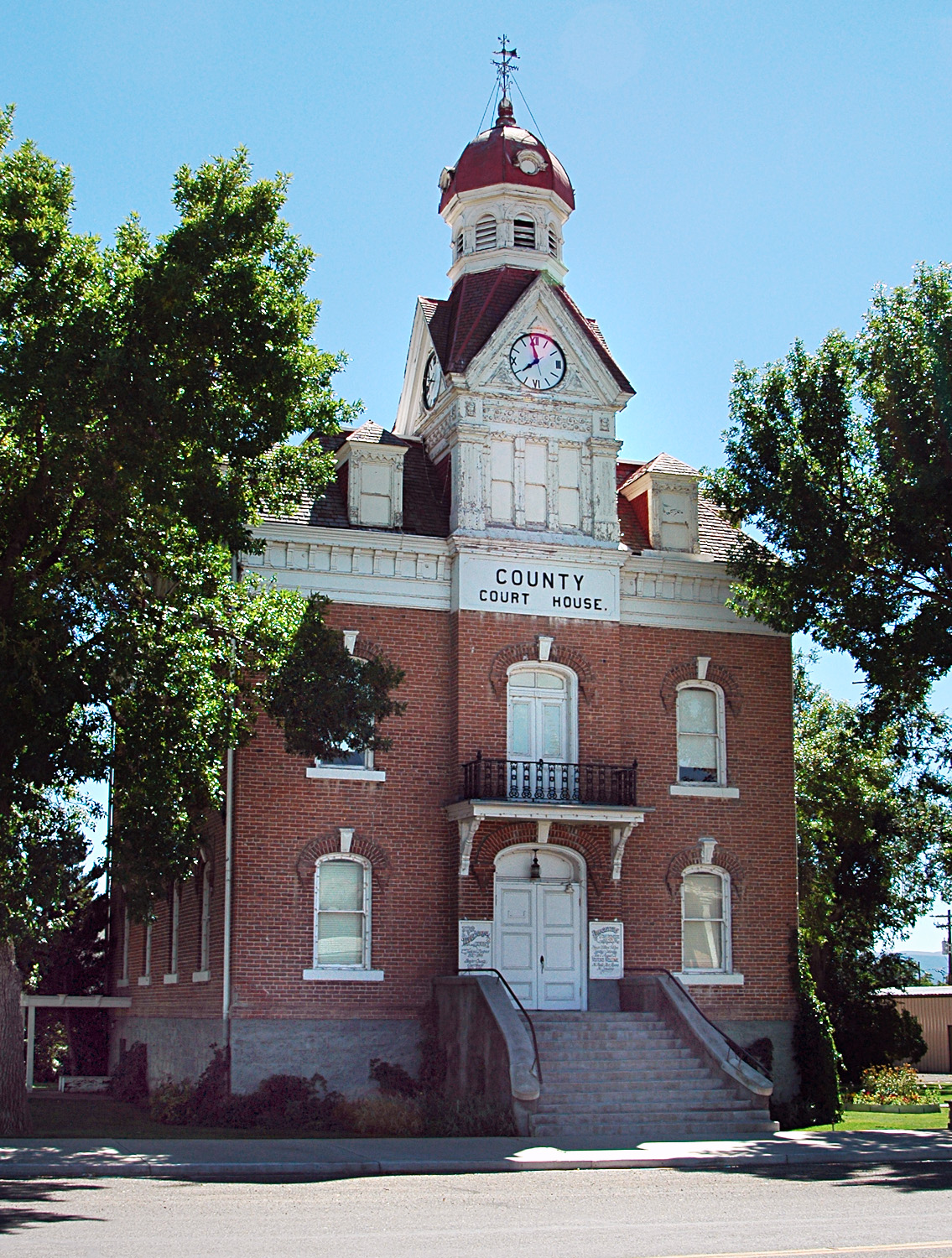
- Old Beaver County courthouse.

- Logo

- Location within the U.S. state of Utah
- Coordinates: 38.34°N 113.23°W
- Country: United States
- State: Utah
- Founded: 1856
- Named for: North American beaver
- Seat: Beaver
- Largest city: Beaver

Area
  - Total: 2,592 sq mi (6,710 km^{2})
  - Land: 2,590 sq mi (6,700 km^{2})
  - Water: 2.1 sq mi (5.4 km^{2}) 0.08%

Population (2020)
  - Total: 7,072
  - Estimate (2025): 7,301 ▲
  - Density: 2.73/sq mi (1.05/km^{2})
- Time zone: UTC−7 (Mountain)
  - Summer (DST): UTC−6 (MDT)
- Congressional district: 2nd
- Website: beaver.utah.gov

Beaver County is a county in west central Utah, United States. As of the 2020 United States census, the population was 7,072, up from the 2010 figure of 6,629. Its county seat and largest city is Beaver. The county was named for the abundance of beaver in the area.

== History ==
Explorers of European descent first visited present-day Beaver County in the 1776 Domínguez-Escalante Expedition. The proposed territory of Deseret (soon changed to Utah Territory) began with the arrival of Mormon pioneers in 1847. After the immediate Great Salt Lake City area was settled, settlers moved into more outlying areas, including the future Beaver County area. The county was created by the Utah territorial legislature from a section of Iron County on January 5, 1856, before the settlement of Beaver town was founded later that year. The county was named for the animal, which was plentiful there. The county boundary as delineated by that act included areas in present-day Colorado and Nevada. The defined boundary was altered on January 16, 1861, by the creation of two counties in present Nevada. The county area was effectively reduced on February 28, 1861, by the US Congress when it created Colorado Territory, taking all of the Beaver County areas east of 109 degrees longitude. The county's boundary was enlarged on January 17, 1861, by the addition of parcels from Millard, Sanpete, and St. Mary's counties. However, its west area was reduced by the creation of the Nevada Territory on July 14, 1862 (this adjustment was altered on May 5, 1866, by the action of the US Congress, effectively ceding all Beaver County area west of 114 degrees longitude to Nevada counties). The county area was also reduced on January 16, 1865, when Piute County was created from Beaver territory.

A quarter of the county's workers are employed by hog processor Smithfield Foods.

== Geography ==
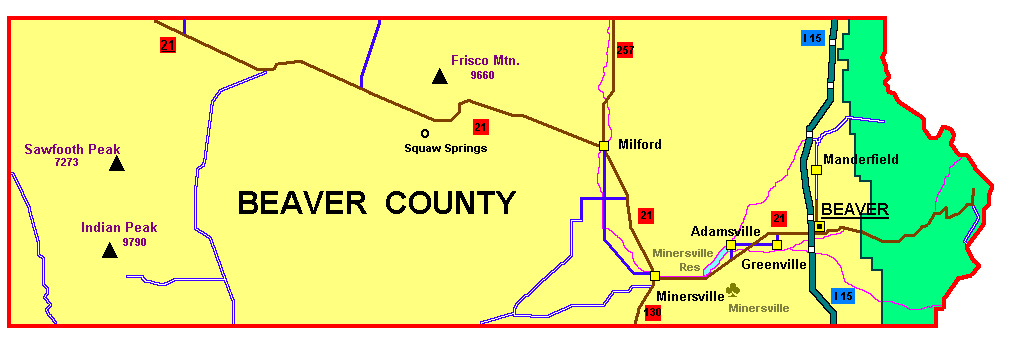
Beaver County (UT) Details

Beaver County lies on the west side of Utah. Its west border abuts the east border of the state of Nevada. The west part of the county consists of low rolling hills punctuated by isolated mountains. The east edge of the county runs to the crest of a north–south-running mountain ridge. The terrain slopes to the west and north; its highest point is a mountain crest on its east border, at 12,011 ft (3,661 m) ASL. The county has a total area of 2,592 square miles (6,710 km^{2}), of which 2,590 square miles (6,700 km^{2}) is land and 2.1 square miles (5.4 km^{2}) (0.08%) is water.

The Tushar Mountains lies on the eastern boundary of the county, reaching to 12,000 feet (3,700 m) in elevation and providing water for the farming communities of Beaver and Manderfield. To the west, barren desert valleys typify the scenery, separated by mountains lightly forested with junipers.

=== Adjacent counties ===
- Lincoln County, Nevada - west
- Millard County - north
- Sevier County - northeast
- Piute County - east
- Garfield County - southeast
- Iron County - south

=== Protected areas ===
- Fishlake National Forest (part)
- Indian Peak State Game Management Area
- Minersville National Forest (part)

== Demographics ==
Historical population
| Census | Pop. | Note | %± |
|---|---|---|---|
| 1860 | 785 | | — |
| 1870 | 2,007 | | 155.7% |
| 1880 | 3,918 | | 95.2% |
| 1890 | 3,340 | | −14.8% |
| 1900 | 3,613 | | 8.2% |
| 1910 | 4,717 | | 30.6% |
| 1920 | 5,139 | | 8.9% |
| 1930 | 5,136 | | −0.1% |
| 1940 | 5,014 | | −2.4% |
| 1950 | 4,856 | | −3.2% |
| 1960 | 4,331 | | −10.8% |
| 1970 | 3,800 | | −12.3% |
| 1980 | 4,378 | | 15.2% |
| 1990 | 4,765 | | 8.8% |
| 2000 | 6,005 | | 26.0% |
| 2010 | 6,629 | | 10.4% |
| 2020 | 7,072 | | 6.7% |
| 2025 (est.) | 7,301 | ▲ | 3.2% |
US Decennial Census; 1790–1960 1900–1990; 1990–2000 2010–2018 2019 2020

=== Racial and ethnic composition ===
Beaver County, Utah – Racial and ethnic composition Note: the US Census treats Hispanic/Latino as an ethnic category. This table excludes Latinos from the racial categories and assigns them to a separate category. Hispanics/Latinos may be of any race.
| Race / Ethnicity (NH = Non-Hispanic) | Pop 1980 | Pop 1990 | Pop 2000 | Pop 2010 | Pop 2020 | % 1980 | % 1990 | % 2000 | % 2010 | % 2020 |
|---|---|---|---|---|---|---|---|---|---|---|
| White alone (NH) | 4,245 | 4,584 | 5,491 | 5,700 | 5,717 | 96.96% | 96.20% | 91.44% | 85.99% | 80.84% |
| Black or African American alone (NH) | 0 | 5 | 16 | 14 | 23 | 0.00% | 0.10% | 0.27% | 0.21% | 0.33% |
| Native American or Alaska Native alone (NH) | 27 | 36 | 53 | 50 | 70 | 0.62% | 0.76% | 0.88% | 0.75% | 0.99% |
| Asian alone (NH) | 21 | 19 | 35 | 70 | 32 | 0.48% | 0.40% | 0.58% | 1.06% | 0.45% |
| Native Hawaiian or Pacific Islander alone (NH) | x | x | 5 | 17 | 21 | x | x | 0.08% | 0.26% | 0.30% |
| Other race alone (NH) | 0 | 1 | 0 | 8 | 8 | 0.00% | 0.02% | 0.00% | 0.12% | 0.11% |
| Mixed race or Multiracial (NH) | x | x | 72 | 54 | 135 | x | x | 1.20% | 0.81% | 1.91% |
| Hispanic or Latino (any race) | 85 | 120 | 333 | 716 | 1,066 | 1.94% | 2.52% | 5.55% | 10.80% | 15.07% |
| Total | 4,378 | 4,765 | 6,005 | 6,629 | 7,072 | 100.00% | 100.00% | 100.00% | 100.00% | 100.00% |

=== 2020 census ===
According to the 2020 United States census and 2020 American Community Survey, there were 7,072 people in Beaver County with a population density of 2.7 people per square mile (1.1/km^{2}). Among non-Hispanic or Latino people, the racial makeup was 5,717 (80.8%) White, 23 (0.3%) African American, 70 (1.0%) Native American, 32 (0.5%) Asian, 21 (0.3%) Pacific Islander, 8 (0.1%) from other races, and 135 (1.9%) from two or more races. 1,066 (15.1%) people were Hispanic or Latino.

There were 3,758 (53.14%) males and 3,314 (46.86%) females, and the population distribution by age was 2,162 (30.6%) under the age of 18, 3,862 (54.6%) from 18 to 64, and 1,048 (14.8%) who were at least 65 years old. The median age was 34.4 years.

There were 2,276 households in Beaver County with an average size of 3.11 of which 1,692 (74.3%) were families and 584 (25.7%) were non-families. Among all families, 1,368 (60.1%) were married couples, 140 (6.2%) were male householders with no spouse, and 184 (8.1%) were female householders with no spouse. Among all non-families, 497 (21.8%) were a single person living alone and 87 (3.8%) were two or more people living together. 900 (39.5%) of all households had children under the age of 18. 1,719 (75.5%) of households were owner-occupied while 557 (24.5%) were renter-occupied.

The median income for a Beaver County household was $66,705 and the median family income was $75,066, with a per-capita income of $24,540. The median income for males that were full-time employees was $53,514 and for females $36,696. 4.1% of the population and 2.9% of families were below the poverty line.

In terms of education attainment, out of the 3,871 people in Beaver County 25 years or older, 334 (8.6%) had not completed high school, 1,046 (27.0%) had a high school diploma or equivalency, 1,492 (38.5%) had some college or associate degree, 862 (22.3%) had a bachelor's degree, and 137 (3.5%) had a graduate or professional degree.

== Politics and government ==
Beaver County voters have traditionally voted Republican. In no national election since 1964 has the county selected the Democratic Party candidate. Jimmy Carter in 1976 was the last Democrat to even come within ten points of winning Beaver County.

State elected offices
| Position | District | Name | Affiliation | First elected |
|---|---|---|---|---|
| Senate | 24 | Derrin Owens | Republican | 2020 |
| Senate | 28 | Evan Vickers | Republican | 2012 |
| House of Representatives | 68 | Merrill Nelson | Republican | 2012 |
| House of Representatives | 73 | Phil Lyman | Republican | 2018 |
| Board of Education | 14 | Mark Huntsman | Nonpartisan | 2014 |

United States presidential election results for Beaver County, Utah
| Year | Republican | | Democratic | | Third party(ies) | |
| Year | No. | % | No. | % | No. | % |
|---|---|---|---|---|---|---|
| 1896 | 205 | 16.24% | 1,057 | 83.76% | 0 | 0.00% |
| 1900 | 682 | 51.90% | 629 | 47.87% | 3 | 0.23% |
| 1904 | 869 | 58.17% | 593 | 39.69% | 32 | 2.14% |
| 1908 | 945 | 56.02% | 714 | 42.32% | 28 | 1.66% |
| 1912 | 671 | 39.75% | 602 | 35.66% | 415 | 24.59% |
| 1916 | 842 | 38.38% | 1,291 | 58.84% | 61 | 2.78% |
| 1920 | 1,056 | 57.49% | 741 | 40.34% | 40 | 2.18% |
| 1924 | 989 | 53.34% | 578 | 31.18% | 287 | 15.48% |
| 1928 | 1,149 | 54.98% | 936 | 44.78% | 5 | 0.24% |
| 1932 | 969 | 44.03% | 1,218 | 55.34% | 14 | 0.64% |
| 1936 | 913 | 40.38% | 1,337 | 59.13% | 11 | 0.49% |
| 1940 | 1,101 | 45.78% | 1,303 | 54.18% | 1 | 0.04% |
| 1944 | 958 | 45.88% | 1,128 | 54.02% | 2 | 0.10% |
| 1948 | 1,057 | 46.69% | 1,190 | 52.56% | 17 | 0.75% |
| 1952 | 1,277 | 55.16% | 1,038 | 44.84% | 0 | 0.00% |
| 1956 | 1,190 | 53.60% | 1,030 | 46.40% | 0 | 0.00% |
| 1960 | 971 | 45.65% | 1,156 | 54.35% | 0 | 0.00% |
| 1964 | 792 | 39.98% | 1,189 | 60.02% | 0 | 0.00% |
| 1968 | 989 | 50.87% | 795 | 40.90% | 160 | 8.23% |
| 1972 | 1,332 | 64.88% | 682 | 33.22% | 39 | 1.90% |
| 1976 | 1,088 | 52.41% | 963 | 46.39% | 25 | 1.20% |
| 1980 | 1,477 | 68.47% | 621 | 28.79% | 59 | 2.74% |
| 1984 | 1,516 | 67.95% | 708 | 31.73% | 7 | 0.31% |
| 1988 | 1,286 | 60.89% | 816 | 38.64% | 10 | 0.47% |
| 1992 | 1,040 | 49.27% | 668 | 31.64% | 403 | 19.09% |
| 1996 | 1,164 | 55.59% | 687 | 32.81% | 243 | 11.60% |
| 2000 | 1,653 | 73.40% | 541 | 24.02% | 58 | 2.58% |
| 2004 | 2,023 | 79.52% | 493 | 19.38% | 28 | 1.10% |
| 2008 | 1,902 | 75.54% | 542 | 21.53% | 74 | 2.94% |
| 2012 | 2,174 | 84.92% | 346 | 13.52% | 40 | 1.56% |
| 2016 | 1,838 | 73.37% | 264 | 10.54% | 403 | 16.09% |
| 2020 | 2,695 | 86.94% | 357 | 11.52% | 48 | 1.55% |
| 2024 | 2,781 | 86.58% | 394 | 12.27% | 37 | 1.15% |

== Communities ==
Map of Beaver County municipalities

=== Cities ===
- Beaver (county seat)
- Milford

=== Towns ===
- Minersville

=== Unincorporated communities ===
- Adamsville
- Cook Corner
- Greenville
- Manderfield
- North Creek

=== Former communities ===
- Arago City
- Blueacre
- Cunningham Hill
- Frisco
- Lincoln
- Murdock
- Nada
- Newhouse
- Shauntie
- Shenandoah City
- Smyths
- Sulphurdale
- Three Creeks
- Upton
- Yellow Banks

== Recreation ==
- The American Discovery Trail traverses the county running through both Beaver and Milford.
- Elk Mountain is home to the Eagle Point Ski area.
- Rock Corral Recreation Area, an area of geologic interest managed by the BLM

== Education ==
There is one school district, Beaver School District.

== See also ==
- List of counties in Utah
- National Register of Historic Places listings in Beaver County, Utah
