= Cricket Mountains =

Mountain range in Utah, United States

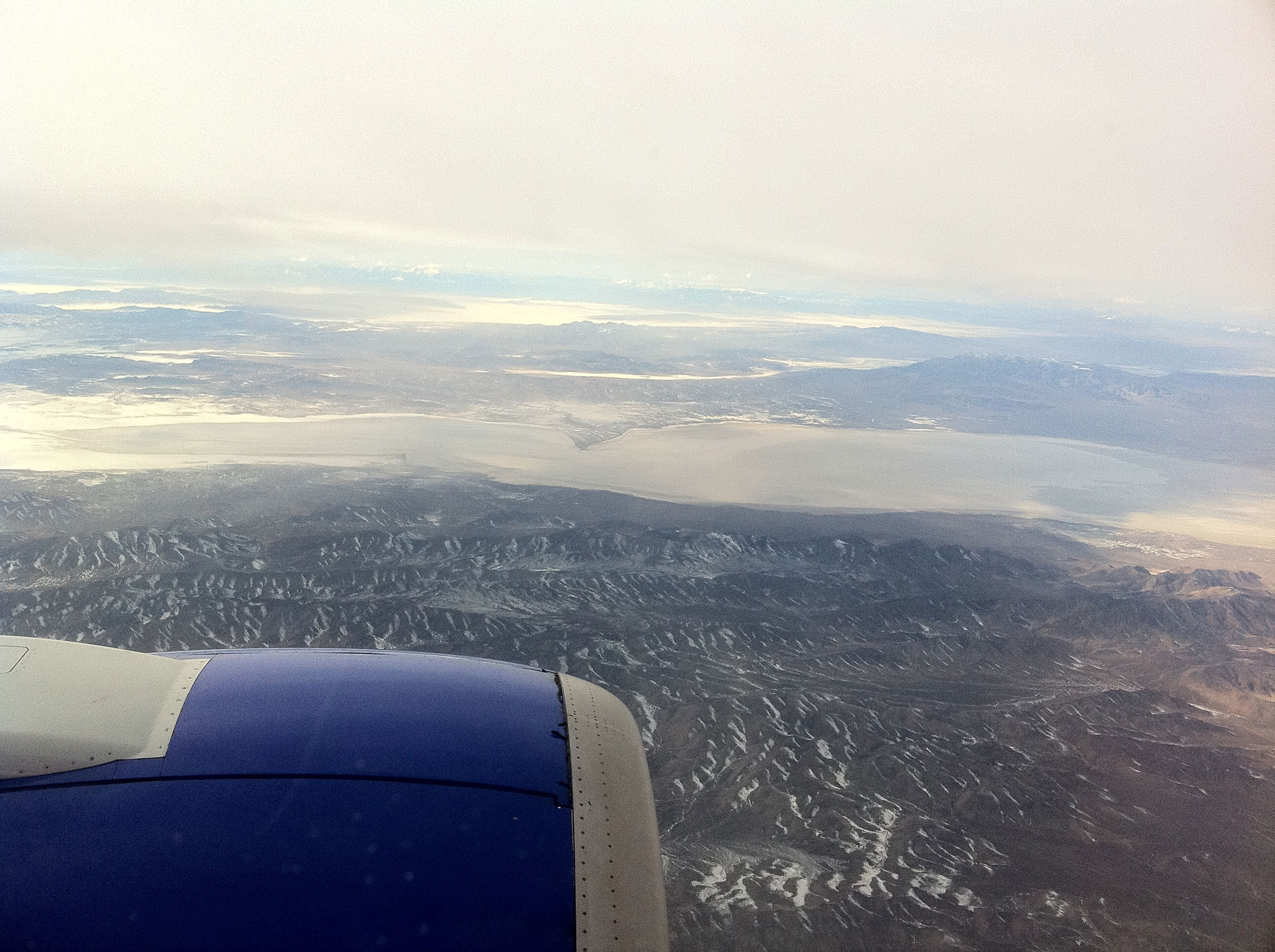
- (view due-west)-Overlooking Cricket Mountains and Sevier Lake bordering west: House Range; bordering westward, north lies Tule Valley, south, Wah Wah Valley, then Confusion Range. The larger Ferguson Desert lies on the horizon.

Highest point
- Peak: Headlight Mountain, (extreme southwest)-Cricket Mountains
- Elevation: 5,999 ft (1,828 m)
- Coordinates: 38°47′47″N 113°01′35″W

Dimensions
- Length: 35 mi (56 km) SW x NE
- Width: 12 mi (19 km)

Geography
- Location within Utah
- Country: United States
- State: Utah
- Region(s): ((southwest)-Great Basin Desert) (southwest)-Sevier Desert
- County: Millard
- City: Black Rock
- Borders on: Sevier Lake-W; House Range-W; Sevier Desert-W, N & E; Utah State Route 257-E & SE; Black Rosk, UT-SE; San Francisco Mountains-SW

The Cricket Mountains are a 35-mile (56 km) long mountain range located in central-south Millard County, Utah, United States, on the east border of Sevier Lake, in the Great Basin Desert.

The southwestern Cricket Mountains merge southwest into the smaller San Francisco Mountains on the southern border of Sevier Lake and on the east of Wah Wah Valley.

== Description ==
The Cricket Mountains rise to peaks ranging from the 6,000-foot (1,800 m) elevation to its highpoint of Headlight Mountain, 6,749 feet (2,057 m), in the extreme southwest of the range. The Cricket Mountains are bordered by the Sevier Desert on the east, north, and west, where the Sevier River flows west then southwest into Sevier Lake, on the range's west border.

The southwest of the range merges into the northeast of the San Francisco Mountains, a slightly smaller range. Both ranges trend southwesterly x northeast, presumably part of Basin and Range block faulting.

=== Graymont Lime ===
Graymont Lime has a plant in the Cricket Mountains, about 35 miles (56 km) southwest of Delta. It is one of the 10 largest lime plants in the United States. It was previously owned by Continental Lime, which was purchased by Graymont Lime.

== See also ==
- List of mountain ranges of Utah
