= Crystal Springs =

Crystal Springs or Crystal Spring may refer to:

== Bodies of water ==
- Crystal Spring (Beaver County, Utah)
- Crystal Spring (Box Elder County, Utah)
- Crystal Springs Reservoir in San Mateo County, California
  - Crystal Springs Dam, which delineates the reservoir

== Populated places ==
=== Canada ===
- Crystal Springs, Alberta
- Crystal Springs, Saskatchewan

=== United States ===
- Crystal Springs, Arkansas
- Crystal Springs, California
  - Former name of Sanitarium, California in Napa County, California
  - Former village of Crystal Springs in San Mateo County, California
- Crystal Springs, Florida
- Crystal Springs, Kansas
- Crystal Springs, Mississippi
- Crystal Springs, Nevada
- Crystal Springs, Ohio
- Crystal Springs, West Virginia
