= Crystal Spring (Beaver County, Utah) =

Spring in Utah, United States

Coordinates: 38°32′04″N 113°17′38″W

Crystal Spring is a spring in northern Beaver County, Utah, United States.

== Description ==
The spring is located on the west face of the San Francisco Mountains, on the northern slope of Frisco Peak and is about 1 mile (1.6 km) north-northwest of the peak. The water produced by the spring flows west-northwest down into the Wah Wah Valley, where is seeps into the ground before reaching any stream.

The spring was so named on account of its crystal clear water.
