= KWLO =

KWLO may refer to:

- KWLO (AM), a radio station (1580 AM) licensed to serve Springville, Utah, United States
- KPTY (AM), a radio station (1330 AM) licensed to serve Waterloo, Iowa, United States, which held the call sign KWLO from 1981 to 2015
