= San Francisco Mountains (Utah) =

American mountain range

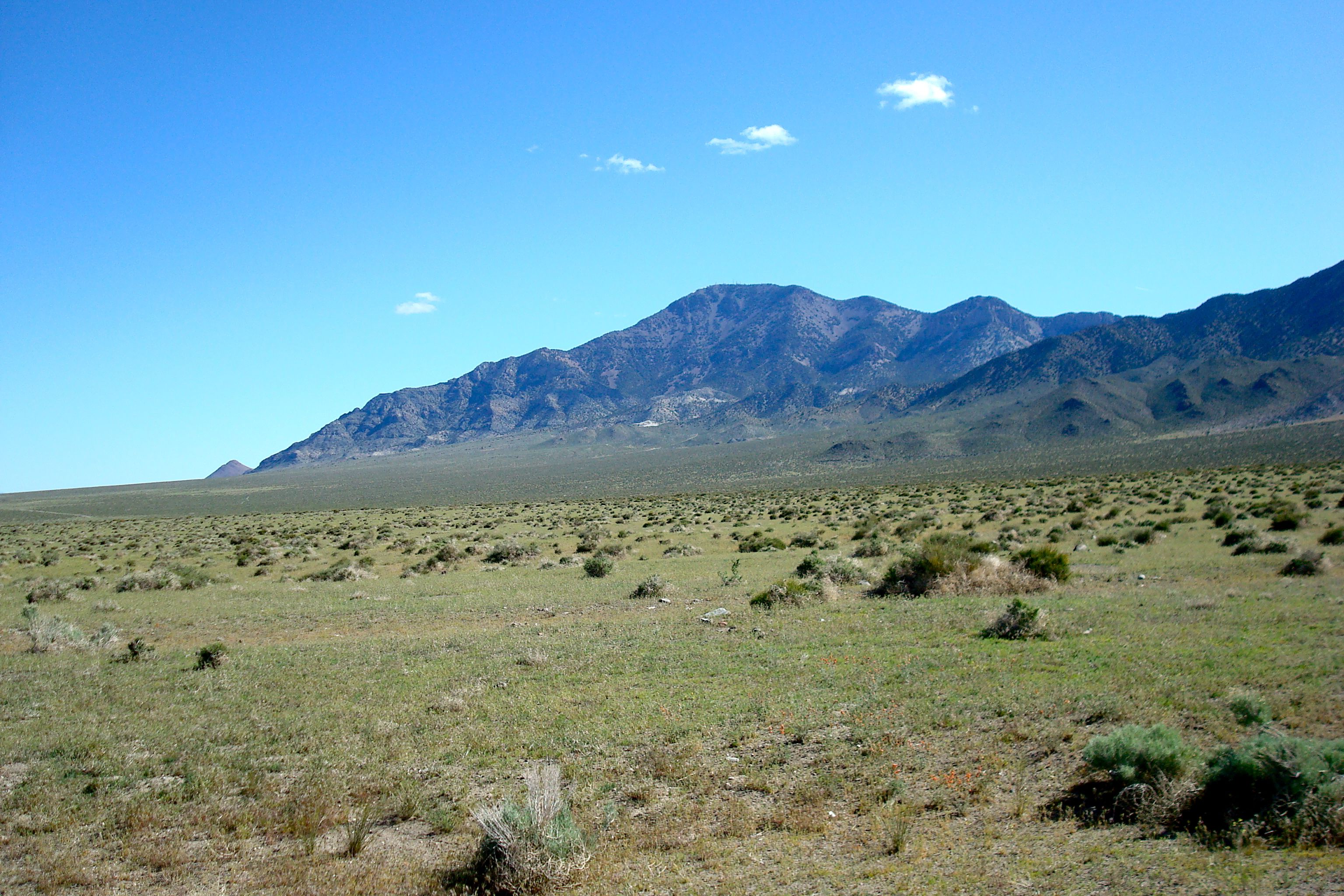
- SW flank of Frisco Peak, 9660 ft View from Utah Route 21-(6 mi to SW) (SE Wah Wah Valley)

Highest point
- Peak: Frisco Peak
- Elevation: 9,660 ft (2,940 m)
- Coordinates: 38°31′13″N 113°17′15″W

Dimensions
- Length: 20 mi (32 km) SW x NE
- Width: 8 mi (13 km)

Geography
- Location within Utah Location within the United States
- Country: United States
- State: Utah
- Region: Great Basin Desert
- Counties: Beaver and Millard
- Communities: Newhouse and Frisco
- Borders on: Wah Wah Valley, Sevier Lake, Cricket Mountains, Black Rock, Beaver River, Beaver Lake Mountains, Milford, Star Range and Utah State Route 21

The San Francisco Mountains are a 20-mile-long (32 km) mountain range located in north‑central Beaver County, Utah, United States that extend into central-south Millard County.

== Description ==
The range is connected in the northeast to the Cricket Mountains with the same Basin and Range, southwest by northeast lineage. Both ranges form the eastern border of the Wah Wah Valley Hardpan and the usually dry Sevier Lake which both have the same northeasterly trendline. The region is in the southwest of the Sevier Desert, and the southwest Great Basin Desert.

The range is linear, with a high peaks section in the southwest; the northeast lower elevation foothills merge into the Cricket Mountains. A smaller, almost circular mountain sub-range is attached on the southeast, the Beaver Lake Mountains, which is also adjacent to the town of Milford; the Beaver River flows north through Milford Valley and enters the desert region east of the mountain ranges. (When flowing above ground, the river intersects with the Sevier River, to the north, and before entering Sevier Lake.)

A ridgeline of the range occurs in the south, and is slightly west of center; and south of the range's center and on the ridgeline is the range highpoint, Frisco Peak, 9,660 feet (2,940 m).

The mountains derive their name indirectly from the Domínguez–Escalante expedition of 1776. Saint Francis of Assisi is the founder of the Franciscan Order of the Catholic Church and the patron saint of wildlife.

== See also ==
- List of mountain ranges of Utah
- Willard L. Eccles Observatory
