= Newhouse, Utah =

- Ghost town
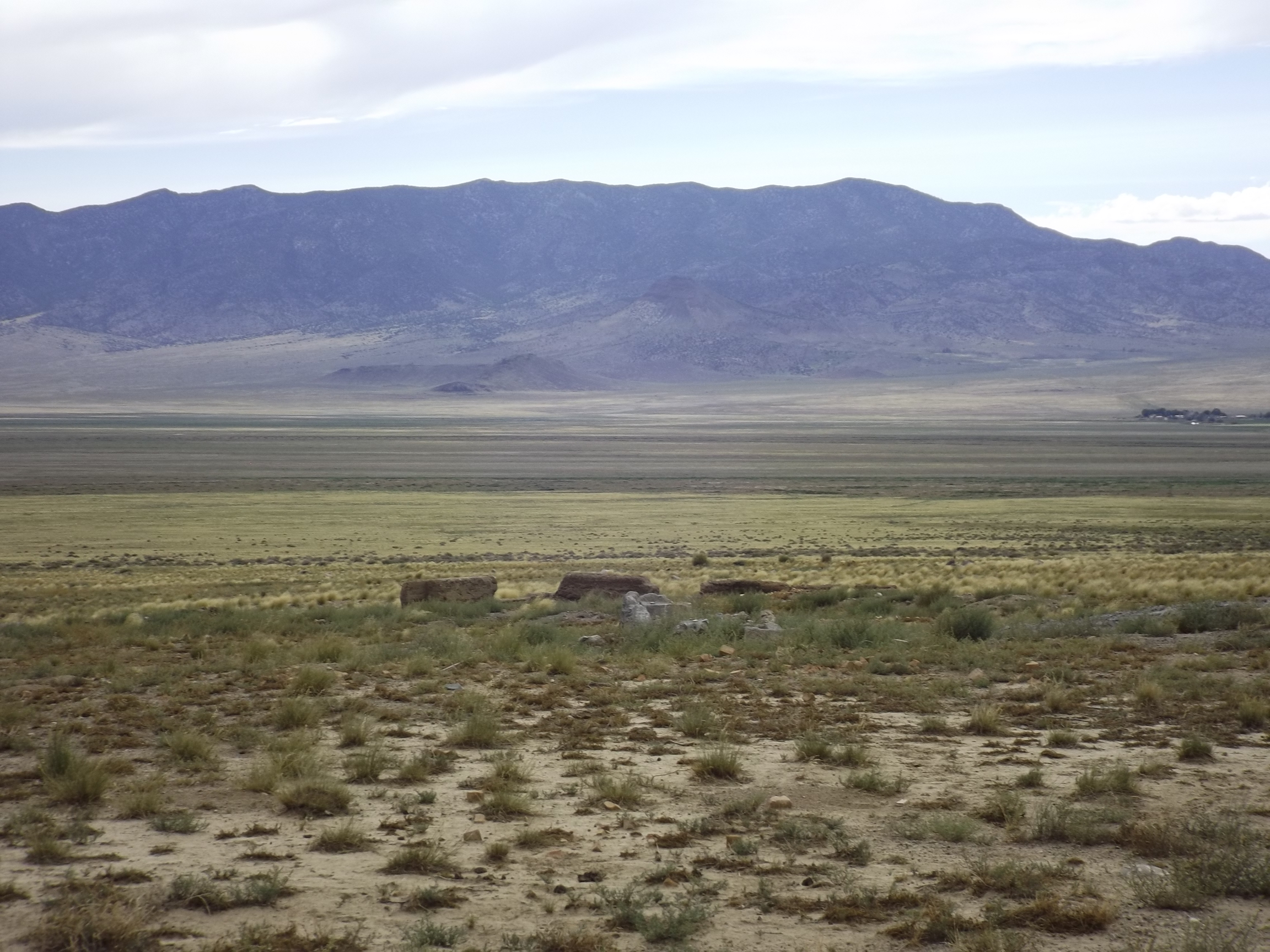
- A foundation in Newhouse

- Location within Utah Location within the United States
- Coordinates: 38°28′52″N 113°20′31″W
- Country: United States
- State: Utah
- County: Beaver
- Established: 1900
- Abandoned: 1921
- Named for: Samuel Newhouse
- Elevation: 5,150 ft (1,570 m)
- GNIS feature ID: 1437650

Newhouse is a ghost town located on the eastern edge of the Wah Wah Valley in Beaver County, Utah, United States. A silver mining town based on the Cactus Mine on the western slopes of the San Francisco Mountains, Newhouse was smaller and quieter than Frisco, 5 miles (8.0 km) to the southeast.

== History ==
The Cactus Mine was first identified as a silver mine in 1870, one of the earliest in the San Francisco Mining District. A succession of companies over the next thirty years failed to profit from the mine. A small smelter was built here in 1892, but it was never successful. Everything changed in 1900 when Samuel Newhouse bought the property. A wealthy Salt Lake City entrepreneur, Newhouse had successfully financed the development of copper mining at the Bingham Canyon Mine two years before. Finally, enough capital was available to make the Cactus Mine workable. The mining camp on his land was initially known as Tent Town, for the temporary nature of its dwellings.

Under Newhouse's management, the silver mining business began to boom. By 1905, the town, now named Newhouse, had many permanent structures, including a restaurant, library, livery stable, hospital, stores, hotel, opera house, and dance hall. Samuel Newhouse was an experienced developer and promoter, and he kept tight control over his company town. He built over seventy stucco company houses for miners to rent. The company piped water 5 miles (8.0 km) from the Wah Wah Springs and installed an electrical generation system. A town park was irrigated with excess water left over from mining and culinary use. As owner, Newhouse named the town's businesses, such as the Cactus Trading Company, the Cactus Club, the Cactus Dancehall, and the Cactus Cafe, after the mine. Public drunkenness was strictly forbidden, and the only saloon permitted was built a mile from town, off of Newhouse's property. Newhouse offered a $50 prize to the first parents to have a baby in Newhouse, and he gave all the town's children Christmas presents.

Newhouse's success was short-lived. By 1910, the Cactus Mine was worked out, and other area mines never amounted to much. During the high metal market prices of World War I, the Utah Leasing Company built a 700 ton flotation mill to rework the Cactus mill tailings, one of the first of its kind. Between 1915 and 1918, the company extracted copper and zinc, shipped the concentrate to Salt Lake valley smelters, and made $120,000 profit. The operation revived the town until the post-war mineral market collapse caused the plant's closure in 1919. Most of the miners took their families elsewhere. Many buildings, including the well-built dance hall, were moved 30 miles (48 km) away to Milford. The cafe kept operating, serving those few miners who stayed on, until it burned down in 1921.

In 1922, filmmakers came to Newhouse to make the silent film The Covered Wagon.

Dozens of ruined buildings, foundations, and rubble remain at the town site.

== See also ==
- List of ghost towns in Utah
