= San Francisco Mining District =

San Francisco Mining District may mean:

- San Francisco Mining District (Utah), in the vicinity of Frisco, Utah
- San Francisco Mining District (Arizona), in Mohave County, Arizona
