= Samuel Irving Newhouse =

Samuel Irving Newhouse may refer to:

- Samuel Irving Newhouse Sr. (1895–1979), publisher, founder of Advance Publications empire, which controls Condé Nast Publications
- Samuel Irving Newhouse Jr. (1927-2017), nicknamed Si Newhouse, chairman and CEO of Advance Publications and chairman of Condé Nast
- Samuel Irving Newhouse IV, featured in the documentary Born Rich (2003)

== See also ==
- Samuel Newhouse (1853 – 1930), Utah entrepreneur and mining magnate
- MV Samuel I. Newhouse, a boat in the Staten Island Ferry fleet
