= Star Range (disambiguation) =

Star Range is a small mountain range in Beaver County, Utah, U.S.

Star Range may also refer to:

- Star Mountains, the "Star Range" of Papua New Guinea
- The "Star" range of motorcycles by the Yamaha Motor Company

== See also ==
- Sierra Estrella (Spanish for Star Range), a mountain range located southwest of Phoenix, Arizona, U.S.
