= Beaver Lake Mountains =

Mountain range in the American state of Utah

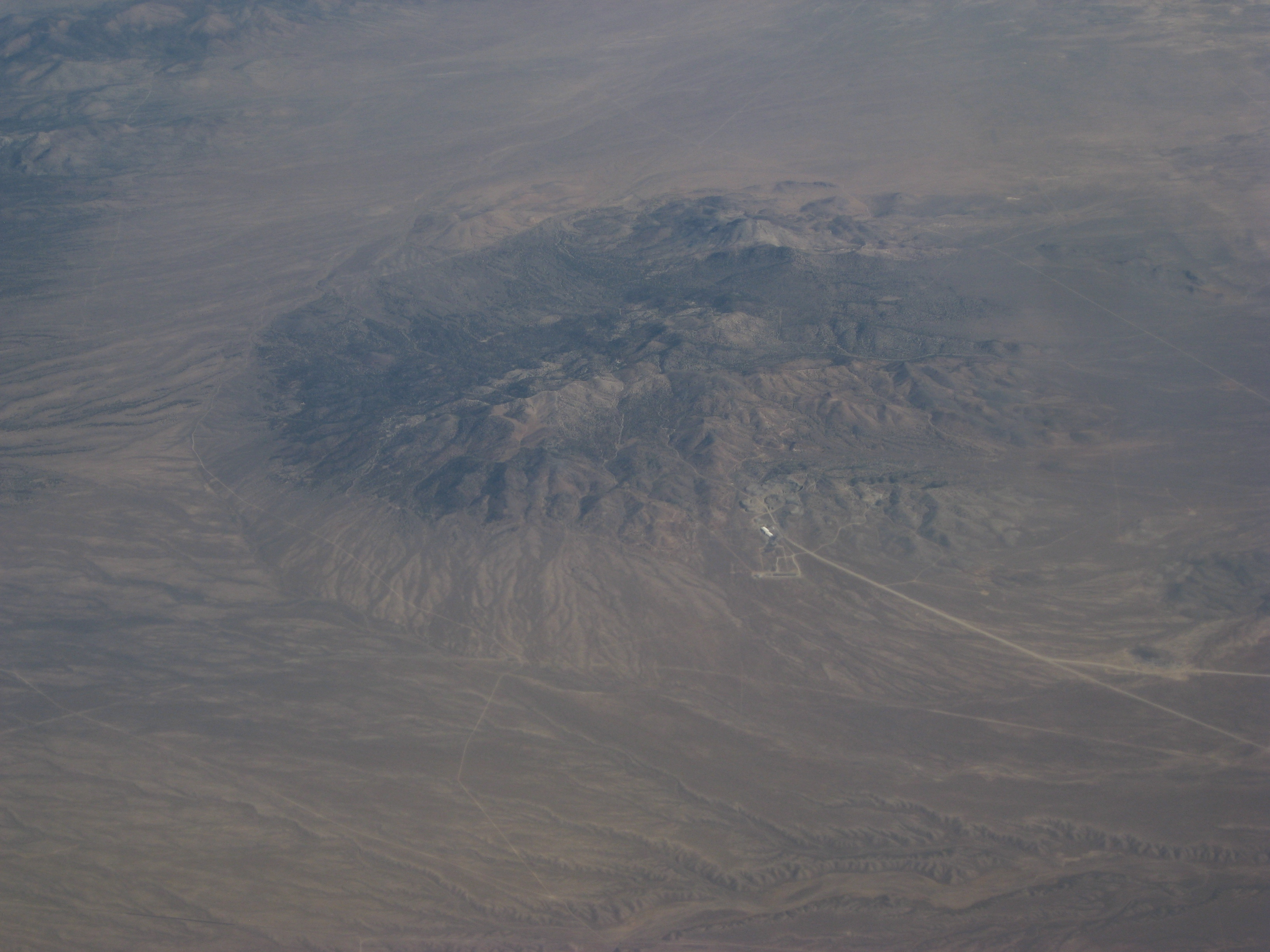
- Aerial view of the Beaver Lake Mountains from the south, August 2009

Highest point
- Elevation: 6,895 ft (2,102 m)

Dimensions
- Length: 8 mi (13 km)

Geography
- Location within Utah
- Country: United States
- State: Utah
- Regions: Beaver River floodplain, Great Basin Desert, Sevier Desert, Black Rock Desert volcanic field and Escalante Desert
- County: Beaver
- River: Beaver River
- Communities: Milford and Frisco
- Range coordinates: 38°30′58″N 113°07′02″W
- Borders on: San Francisco Mountains, Star Range and Beaver River

Beaver Lake Mountains is an 8-mile (13 km) long mountain in central and north Beaver County, Utah, United States adjacent the south border of Millard County.

The mountain is bordered on the east by the Beaver River, as it flows due-north past Milford and the small Milford Valley; the river leaves the southeast section of the Escalante Desert, but the Beaver River comes from the east, Beaver Valley and the south terminus of the Mineral Mountains-(Minersville Reservoir).

The Beaver River flows due north to meet the Sevier River, but agricultural use prevents continuous flow through the southwest Sevier Desert region.

== Description ==
The Beaver Lake Mountains is made up of three basic sections: the southwest contains a massif of the Beaver Lake Mountains, at 6,794 feet (2,071 m), about 3 miles (4.8 km) in diameter. Adjacent to the northeast is Lime Mountain. (The lower elevation, and smaller Badger Knolls, 5,450 feet (1,661 m), are just east.)

The Rocky Range is a 2.5-mile (4.0 km) long separate mountain range to the southeast, and is surrounded by washes to the southwest and northwest, that connect eastwards to the Beaver River.

== Access ==
The Beaver Lake Mountains can be reached from Milford, 9 miles (14 km) southeast. Utah State Route 21 traverses southwest of the range, and goes through The Big Wash, and the northeast foothills of the neighboring Star Range. Unimproved routes go north from The Big Wash, cross over, passing Hichory Wash to the range's foothills; routes enter the Beaver Lake Mountains, as well as one route encircles the range's foothills, and Lime Mountain and Beaver Lake Mountains, a total route length of about 22 miles (35 km). The Rocky Range, southeast of Beaver Lake Mountains, has numerous unimproved road access points.

The northeast, and east sections of the range can also be accessed from the north-south road, Utah 257; to the southwest, the Rocky Range section is over the north-flowing Beaver River, so the access has to be from the north areas of the Milford townsite.

From the San Francisco Mountains, the Beaver Lake mountain can be easily accessed by unimproved roads. The foothills between the two ranges are only 2 miles (3.2 km) apart.

== See also ==
- List of mountains in Utah
