= Willard L. Eccles Observatory =

Observatory in Utah, US

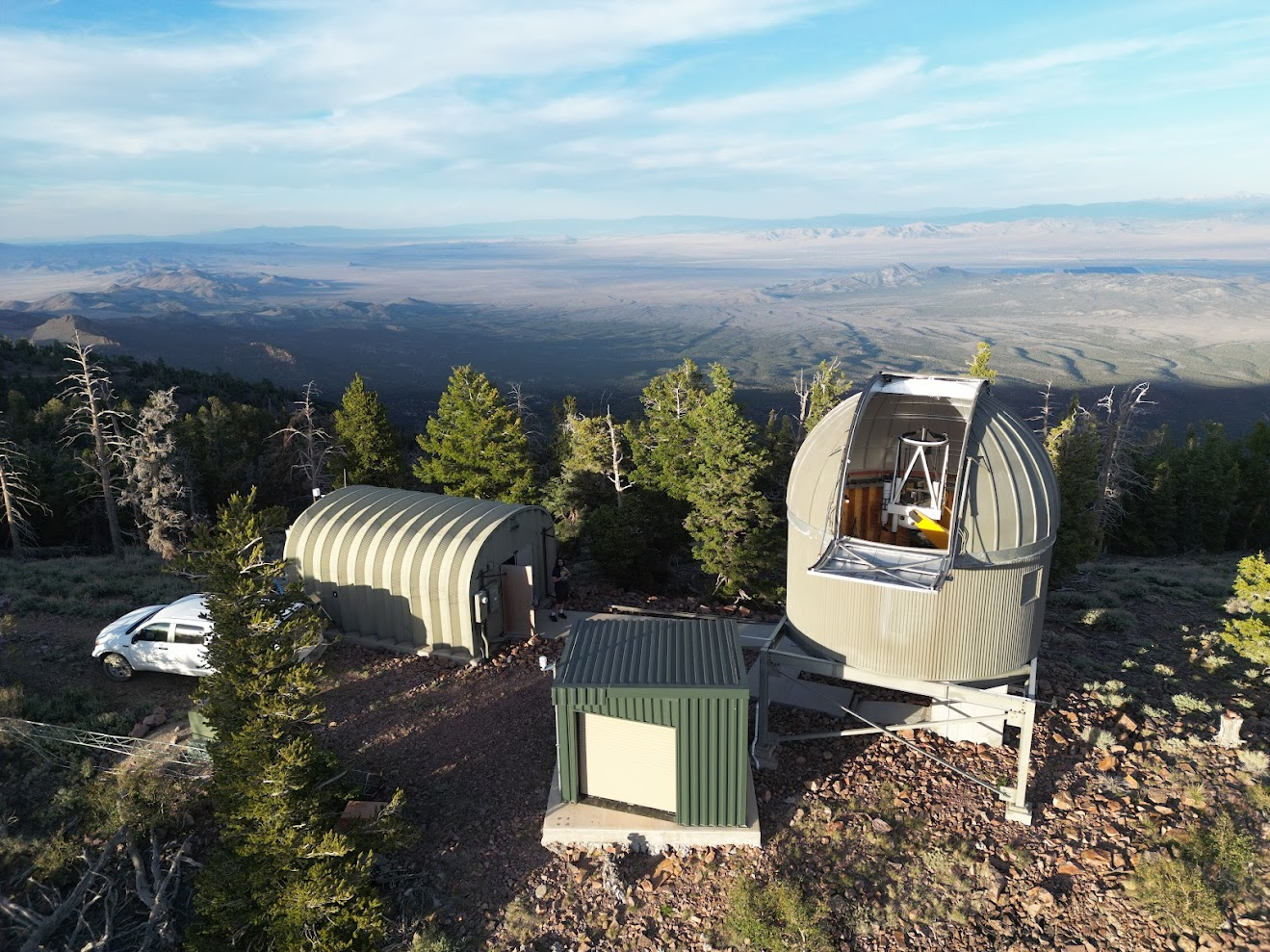
- Willard L Eccles Observatory to the right, Trinity PeV Neutrino Observatory demonstrator to the center, Local Control Room to the left
- Organization: University of Utah
- Location: Frisco Peak, Utah
- Coordinates: 38.5217°N 113.2863°W
- Altitude: 2,912 meters (9,554 ft)
- Established: 2009
- Website: Willard L. Eccles Observatory

Telescopes
- unnamed telescope: 0.8 m reflector

The Willard L. Eccles Observatory (WEO) is an astronomical observatory located on Frisco Peak in the San Francisco Mountains of Utah (USA), about 27 km (17 miles) northwest of Milford, Utah. The observatory is owned and operated by the University of Utah, and opened in 2010. The observatory features a 0.8 m (31 in) Ritchey-Chretien telescope built by DFM Engineering on an equatorial mount. The construction of the observatory was funded by donations from the Willard L. Eccles Foundation and the E.R. & E.W. Dumke Foundation.

== History ==
After the success of South Physics Observatory, an observatory on campus oriented around public star parties and classes, after it was renovated in 2001, and overall growth of astronomy programs at the University of Utah, a proposal for a research observatory in Southern Utah to take advantage of the dark skies was made in the spring of 2006. The Willard L. Eccles Foundation granted funding for the proposal a month after it was made.

In 2008, the site selected for the observatory was Frisco Peak as it was the best combination of the dark skies, altitude, seeing, and dry weather in Southern Utah. The infrastructure required for operations already existed because of the communication infrastructure on the mountain. In 2009, ground broke on site, and first light of the observatory was on October 17th, 2009, on the galaxy NGC891. Currently, the telescope is used for classes and small research projects, and is being upgraded for Transient research.

In 2023, the Trinity PeV Neutrino Observatory built a telescope on site for a demonstration of a larger telescope that will eventually be built adjacent to the current observatory.

== See also ==
- West Mountain Observatory
- List of astronomical observatories
