= Black Rock, Utah =

The following places in Utah are known as Black Rock:

- Black Rock, Juab County, Utah, a station on the Pony Express, see Wendover Cut-off
- Black Rock, Millard County, Utah, a ghost town
- Black Rock (Tooele County, Utah), a landmark and cape on the northern tip of the Oquirrh Mountains on the south end of the Great Salt Lake
