= KTCE =

Radio station in Payson, Utah

- Payson, Utah; United States
- Broadcast area: Provo, Utah County
- Frequency: 92.1 MHz
- Branding: The Touch 92.1 FM

Programming
- Format: Jazz

Ownership
- Owner: Moenkopi Communications, Inc.

History
- First air date: September 29, 1989

Technical information
- Facility ID: 43339
- Class: A
- Power: 125 watts
- HAAT: 657 meters (2,156 ft)
- Transmitter coordinates: 40°5′21.08″N 111°49′18.72″W

Links
- Website: ktce921.com

KTCE (92.1 FM) is a radio station broadcasting a Jazz format. Licensed to Payson, Utah, United States, it serves the Provo area. The station is currently owned by Moenkopi Communications, Inc. The station first became known as KTCE beginning in 1989. Although the station is lower power, it has often been heard as far north as Salt Lake City. Its studios are in Provo, and the transmitter site is on West Mountain west of Payson.

Starting in 2016, KTCE was expected to relocate its 92.1 frequency, as KUUU, licensed to South Jordan, Utah, would move from 92.5 to 92.3 and upgrade its signal coverage as part of a deal that Broadway made with Community Wireless, who was to move KPCW-FM down from 91.9 to 91.7 and take ownership of the 107.9 signal that Broadway was donating to them after they moved KUDD's Top 40 format to 105.1, where it replaced KAUU's Country format. When the frequency change didn't happen, KTCE stayed on 92.1 MHz instead of moving down the dial to the 91.9 MHz frequency and was not changing its height or wattage.
