= West Mountain Observatory =

Observatory in Utah, US

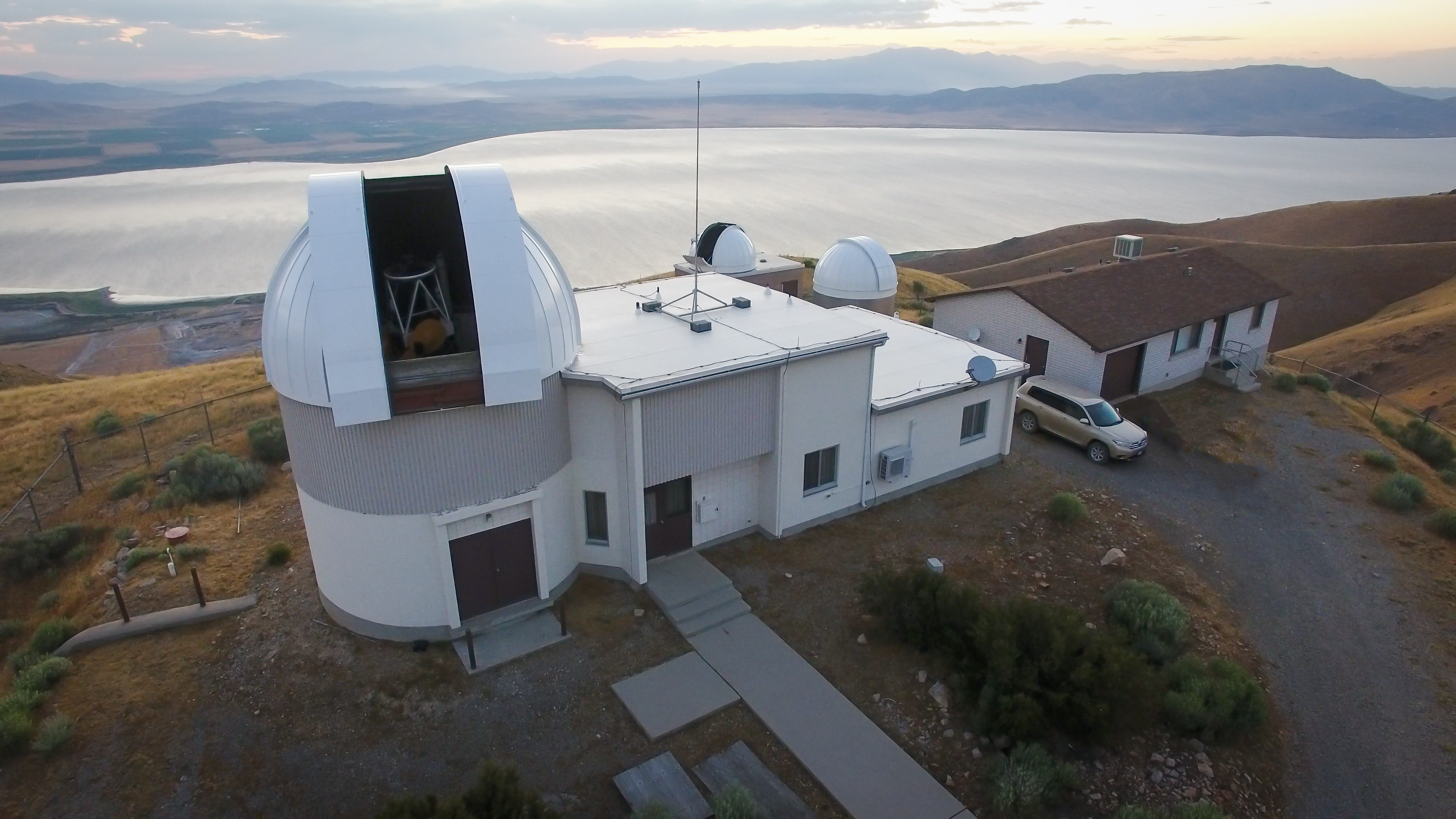
- Organization: Brigham Young University
- Location: West Mountain
- Coordinates: 40.08741°N 111.82604°W
- Altitude: 2,120 meters (6,960 ft)
- Established: 1981
- Website: West Mountain Observatory

Telescopes
- unnamed telescope: 0.9 m reflector
- unnamed telescope: 0.5 m reflector
- unnamed telescope: 0.3 m reflector

West Mountain Observatory (WMO) is an astronomical observatory located on West Mountain near the community of West Mountain, Utah United States, about 22 km (14 miles) southwest of Provo. The observatory is owned and operated by Brigham Young University (BYU), and opened in 1981 after increasing light pollution reduced the utility of the Orson Pratt Observatory on the BYU campus. The first year of observing with the new 0.9 m telescope included imaging of intrinsic variable stars and high-mass X-ray binaries. Past research topics include light curve analysis of Delta Scuti variable stars and identifying pre-main-sequence stars by searching for H-alpha emitting objects.

== Telescopes ==
- A 0.9 m (35 in) reflecting telescope built by DFM Engineering was installed at WMO in 2009. The main dome originally housed a 0.6 m reflector built by Tinsley Laboratories.
- A 0.5 m (20 in) reflector is housed in its own dome on a robotic telescope mount.
- A 0.3 m (12 in) reflector is housed in its own dome on a robotic telescope mount.

== See also ==
- Willard L. Eccles Observatory
- List of astronomical observatories
