= West Mountain, Utah =

- CDP
- Location within Utah County in the State of Utah
- Coordinates: 40°3′47″N 111°46′58″W
- Country: United States
- State: Utah
- County: Utah

Area
  - Total: 10.8 sq mi (28.0 km^{2})
  - Land: 10.8 sq mi (27.9 km^{2})
  - Water: 0 sq mi (0.0 km^{2})
- Elevation: 4,547 ft (1,386 m)

Population (2020)
  - Total: 1,250
  - Density: 116/sq mi (44.8/km^{2})
- Time zone: UTC-7 (Mountain (MST))
  - Summer (DST): UTC-6 (MDT)
- ZIP code: 84651
- Area codes: 385, 801
- FIPS code: 49-83252
- GNIS feature ID: 1852922

West Mountain is a census-designated place (CDP) in Utah County, Utah, United States. It is part of the Provo–Orem Metropolitan Statistical Area. As of the 2020 census, the CDP population was 1,250. The town is at the base of West Mountain (site of the West Mountain Observatory) and bears its name.

== Geography ==
According to the United States Census Bureau, the CDP has a total area of 10.8 square miles (28.0 km^{2}), of which 10.8 square miles (27.9 km^{2}) is land and 0.09% is water.

== Demographics ==
As of the census of 2000, there were 838 people, 191 households, and 173 families residing in the CDP. The population density was 77.7 people per square mile (30.0/km^{2}). There were 197 housing units at an average density of 18.3/sq mi (7.0/km^{2}). The racial makeup of the CDP was 96.54% White, 0.24% African American, 0.24% Native American, 0.12% Asian, 1.19% from other races, and 1.67% from two or more races. Hispanic or Latino of any race were 2.51% of the population.

There were 191 households, out of which 58.6% had children under the age of 18 living with them, 82.7% were married couples living together, 5.8% had a female householder with no husband present, and 9.4% were non-families. 7.3% of all households were made up of individuals, and 4.7% had someone living alone who was 65 years of age or older. The average household size was 4.39 and the average family size was 4.61.

In the CDP, the population was spread out, with 45.3% under the age of 18, 8.6% from 18 to 24, 24.2% from 25 to 44, 15.0% from 45 to 64, and 6.8% who were 65 years of age or older. The median age was 21 years. For every 100 females, there were 109.5 males. For every 100 females age 18 and over, there were 99.1 males.

The median income for a household in the CDP was $56,563, and the median income for a family was $62,500. Males had a median income of $41,875 versus $18,063 for females. The per capita income for the CDP was $12,451. About 11.2% of families and 15.4% of the population were below the poverty line, including 23.0% of those under age 18 and none of those age 65 or over.

== See also ==
- List of census-designated places in Utah
