= KUTN =

Radio station in Levan, Utah

- Levan, Utah; United States
- Broadcast area: Levan, Utah
- Frequency: 96.7 MHz
- Branding: Flashback 96.7

Programming
- Format: Oldies
- Affiliations: Local Radio Networks

Ownership
- Owner: Mid-Utah Media Group; (Sanpete County Broadcasting Co.)
- Sister stations: KKUT, KIXR, KTMP

History
- First air date: January 8, 1999; 27 years ago (as KBLN)
- Former call signs: KBLN (1999–2001); KCFM (2001–2005); KQMB (2005–2022)

Technical information
- Licensing authority: FCC
- Facility ID: 89181
- Class: A
- ERP: 500 watts
- HAAT: −1,854 meters (−6,083 ft)
- Transmitter coordinates: 39°20′12″N 111°27′6″W
- Translator: 96.7 K244DH (Saratoga Springs)
- Repeater: 93.7 KKUT-HD3 (Mount Pleasant)

Links
- Public license information: Public file; LMS
- Webcast: Listen live
- Website: flashback967.com

KUTN (96.7 FM, "Flashback 96.7") is a radio station licensed to Levan, Utah. Owned by Mid-Utah Media Group. it broadcasts an oldies format.

It is also simulcast on the HD Radio subchannel of sister station KKUT in Mount Pleasant, serving Provo.

== History ==
The station began operations on January 8, 1999 as KBLN. On January 25, 2001, the station flipped to a Spanish-language format as KCFM; the format also included Spanish-language LDS Church programming, including the Spanish version of Music & the Spoken Word, and Spanish translations of the General Conferences. On September 21, 2005, the station flipped to adult contemporary as Star 96.7, taking on the former format, branding, and call letters of KQMB after it was converted to an FM simulcast of KSL.

In 2014, the station lost its signal and in 2017, the station went dark. On December 20, 2018, Zeta Holdings, LLC sold the silent station, its booster signal in Provo, and translator K244DH Fort Douglas for $100,000 to Lucky Dog Broadcasting, owned by Franklyn H. & Melanie Mueller. The sale was consummated on May 21, 2019. In 2020, the license for the booster signal in Provo was cancelled. The station returned to air on January 29, 2021, with a soft adult contemporary format branded as KOSY 96.7.

In November 2021, the Utah's Goat classic hits format from sister station KWLO moved to 96.7. Lucky Dog Broadcasting had been leasing the 1580 and 99.9 frequencies from owner RAMS III under a local marketing agreement.

On March 31, 2022, Sanpete County Broadcasting Company filed with the FCC to purchase KQMB, KSRR, and translator K244DH from Lucky Dog Broadcasting for $170,000. On August 31, 2022, the sale of KSRR, KQMB, and K244DH from Lucky Dog Broadcasting to Sanpete County Broadcasting was consummated with the FCC.

On November 7, 2022, the station flipped to oldies as "Flashback 96.7" with the new call letters KUTN carrying programming from the syndicated True Oldies Channel.
