= Star Range =

Mountain range in the U.S. state of Utah

- Location within Utah

Highest point
- Peak: Topache Peak
- Elevation: 6,880 ft (2,100 m)
- Coordinates: 38°20′02″N 113°09′13″W

Dimensions
- Length: 8 mi (13 km) SW x NE

Geography
- Country: United States
- State: Utah
- County: Beaver
- City: Milford
- Borders on: San Francisco Mountains-NW; Beaver Lake Mountains-N; Milford & Milford Valley-E; Mineral Mountains-E; Escalante Desert-SE, S & SW

The Star Range is an 8-mile (12 km) long, small mountain range located in central Beaver County, Utah. The range is "star"-shaped as small ridges end at peaks, like fingers of a hand. Another adjacent range sequence southwest, the Shauntie Hills has other fingers of the star-shape.

Both ranges slope north towards flatlands south of the Sevier Lake region, (southwest Sevier Desert), and San Francisco Mountains. The south flank of the Star Range lies at the northeast perimeter of the Escalante Desert; Milford Valley, the site of Milford and a north-flowing stretch of the Beaver River (Sevier River), lies adjacent, and east of the range, a narrowing valley stretch with the Mineral Mountains bordering to the east.

== Description ==
The range is only about 8-mi long. and trends southwest by northeast.

The highpoint of the range is Topache Peak, in the center-southeast bordering the Escalante Desert, at 6,880 feet (2,097 m)).

== Access ==
Access to the northeast or south side of the Star Range is by way of Utah State Route 21, from Milford, or Upton. Utah 21 turns due-west at Milford and crosses the north foothills of the range. The northwest side of the range can be accessed from the same route, (farther west), by way of The Big Wash, which drain washes from the northwest foothills. Utah 21 goes to the southeast flank of the San Francisco Mountains, about 13-mi from Milford.
