= West Mountain (Utah County, Utah) =

Mountain in Utah County, Utah, United States

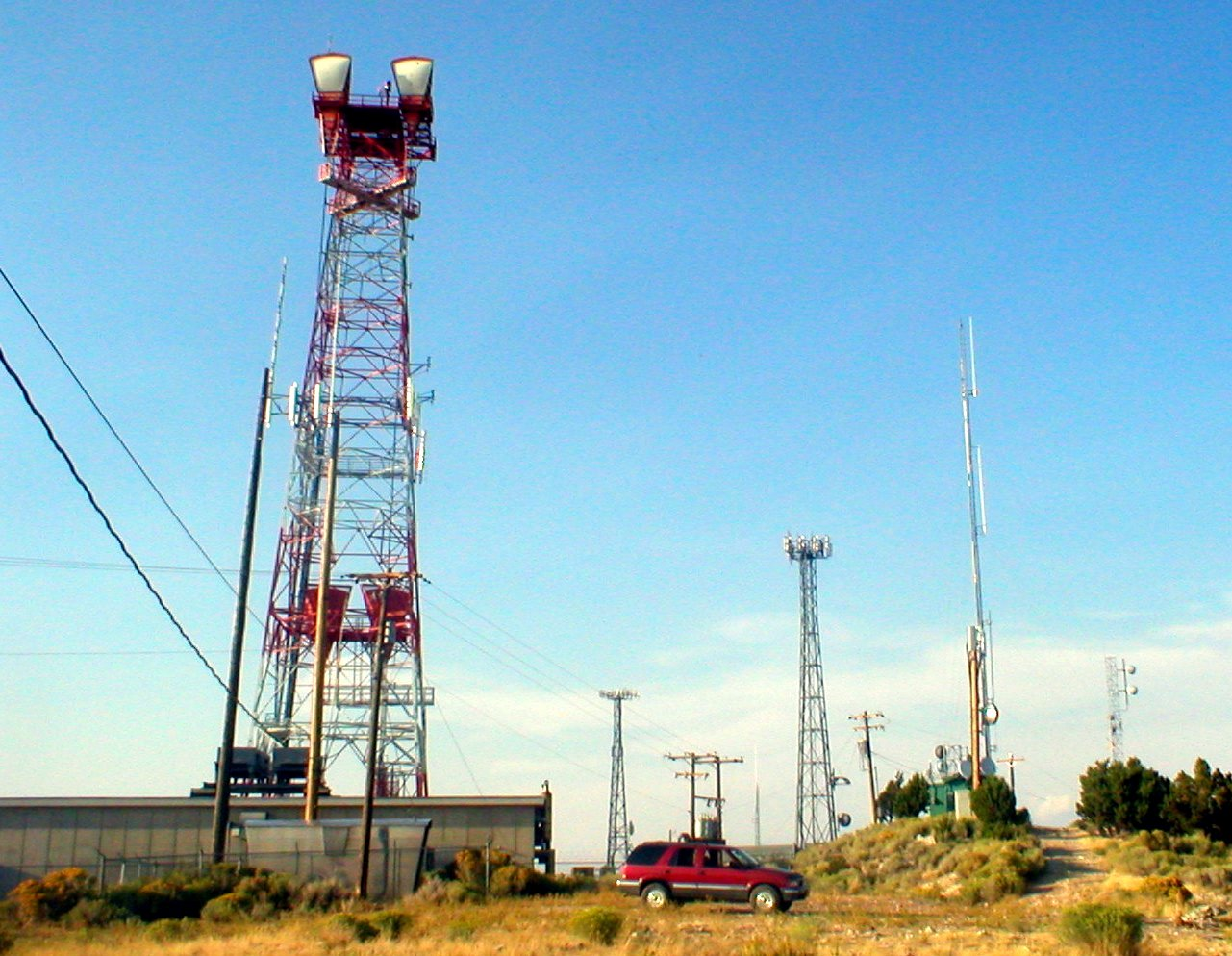
- The north summit of West Mountain, with the radio tower farm. The south summit is slightly higher.

Highest point
- Elevation: 6,912 ft (2,107 m) NAVD 88
- Prominence: 2,104 ft (641 m)
- Coordinates: 40°03′19″N 111°49′46″W

Geography
- Location within Utah
- Location: Utah County, Utah; United States
- Parent range: Wasatch Range
- Topo map: USGS West Mountain

Climbing
- Easiest route: Access road

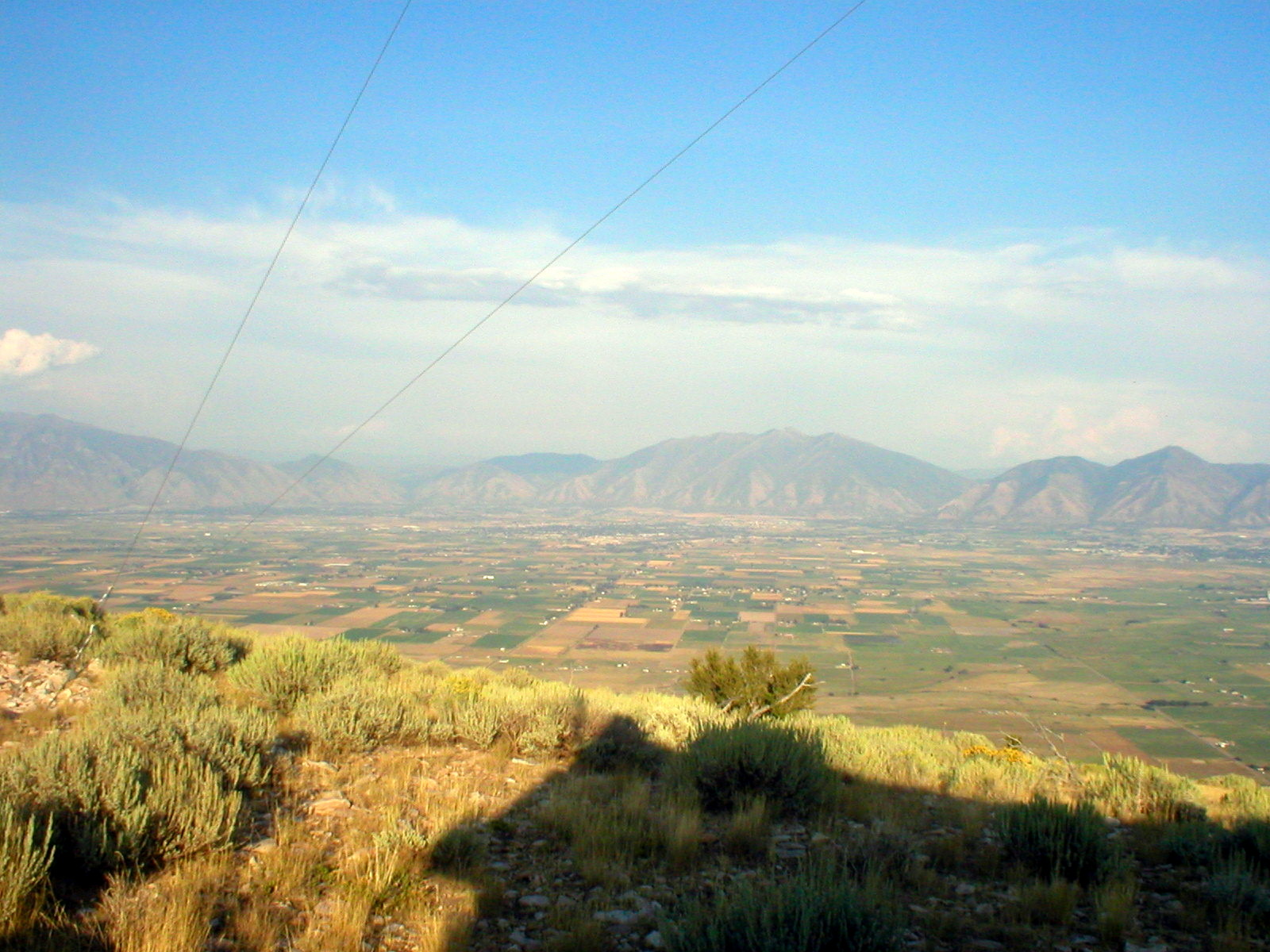
Southern Utah Valley, from West Mountain

West Mountain is a mountain in Utah, United States that is located 15.35 miles (25 km) southwest of the city of Provo, and 4.7 miles (8 km) west of the community of Benjamin. It is home to a radio station tower for KTCE, an FM station licensed to Payson and operating on 92.1 MHz. The mountain is also home to various FM radio translators and an observatory used by students from Brigham Young University (BYU). It can be accessed from a main road that starts near Benjamin. A small census designated place east of the mountain is known as West Mountain as well.

== Geology ==
West Mountain's highest point is at 6,912 feet (2,107 m). The radio station tower sits on the second-highest point on the mountain, about 2 miles north of the true summit. The mountain is on the southern segment of the Wasatch Range, though it is not connected to the main range. The mountain is located on the southern shore of Utah Lake.

== Radio uses ==
The following are translators and radio stations located on the mountain (in order of frequency):

- K202CC-88.3 FM, from parent station KAWZ-FM
- K204BO-88.7 FM, from parent station KUSU-FM.
- K208BZ- 89.1 FM from parent station KBYU-FM.
- KTCE-92.1-FM, a smooth jazz format station licensed to Payson, Utah. Currently off the air
- K252DB-98.3 FM, from parent station KEGH.
- K260DS-99.9 FM, rebroadcasting KWLO 1580 AM.

As well as radio stations, the mountain houses several cellular telephone transmitters providing service for AT&T Wireless, Verizon Wireless and T-Mobile. The mountain also contains towers for local emergency services, and state and federal government services. An older tower, once operated by AT&T, is known more commonly as a "Long Line" tower, and was used for microwave communications is located on the north summit. It is the tallest tower on the mountain, and is the most predominant feature. With the invention of fiber optics, the use of these towers gradually declined, and other similar towers have fallen into disrepair. This particular "long lines" tower, is connected to other towers in Riverton, Utah and Levan, Utah. A ham radio repeater, known as WA7FFM is located on the mountain as well.

== Observatory ==
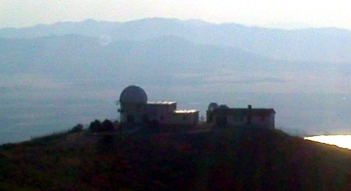
West Mountain Observatory

West Mountain Observatory, which is operated by nearby BYU, is located just southwest of the north summit of West Mountain. It was constructed for the astronomy department of BYU in 1981 and houses three telescopes.

== Access ==
West Mountain road, which leads to the north summit, begins on Lincoln Beach road, directly northeast of the north summit. It is a winding road, which may or may not be in good condition, depending on the season. Those wishing to access the mountain are suggested to use four wheel drive vehicles.

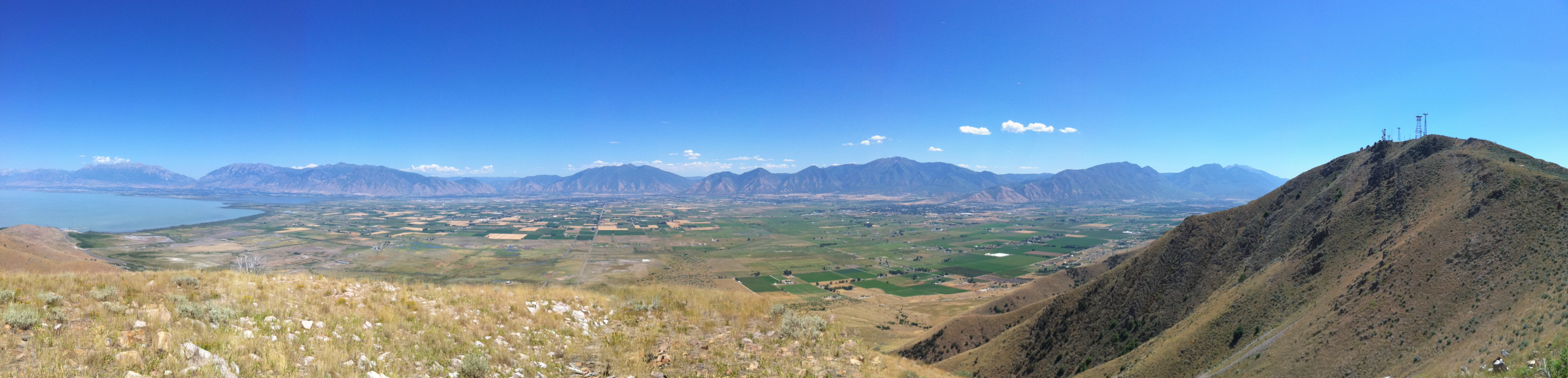
A panoramic view of Utah County between Orem and Provo in the north (left) and the radio towers on West Mountain to the South (right)
