= KIXR =

- Provo, Utah; United States
- Broadcast area: Provo, Utah
- Frequency: 1400 kHz
- Branding: KIX Radio 1400 AM

Programming
- Format: Talk
- Network: Fox News Radio
- Affiliations: Compass Media Networks; Salem Radio Network

Ownership
- Owner: Mid-Utah Media Group; (Sanpete County Broadcasting Co.)
- Sister stations: KKUT, KUTN, KTMP

History
- First air date: November 23, 1947; 78 years ago (as KCSU)
- Former call signs: KCSU (1947–1958); KIXX (1958–1976); KFTN (1976–1985); KXYC (1985–1987); KSRR (1987–2022)
- Call sign meaning: Kix Radio

Technical information
- Licensing authority: FCC
- Facility ID: 53103
- Class: C
- Power: 1,000 watts unlimited
- Transmitter coordinates: 40°13′47.8″N 111°41′11.7″W
- Translator: 94.5 K233DI (Provo, Utah)

Links
- Public license information: Public file; LMS
- Webcast: Listen live
- Website: talkofutahcounty.com

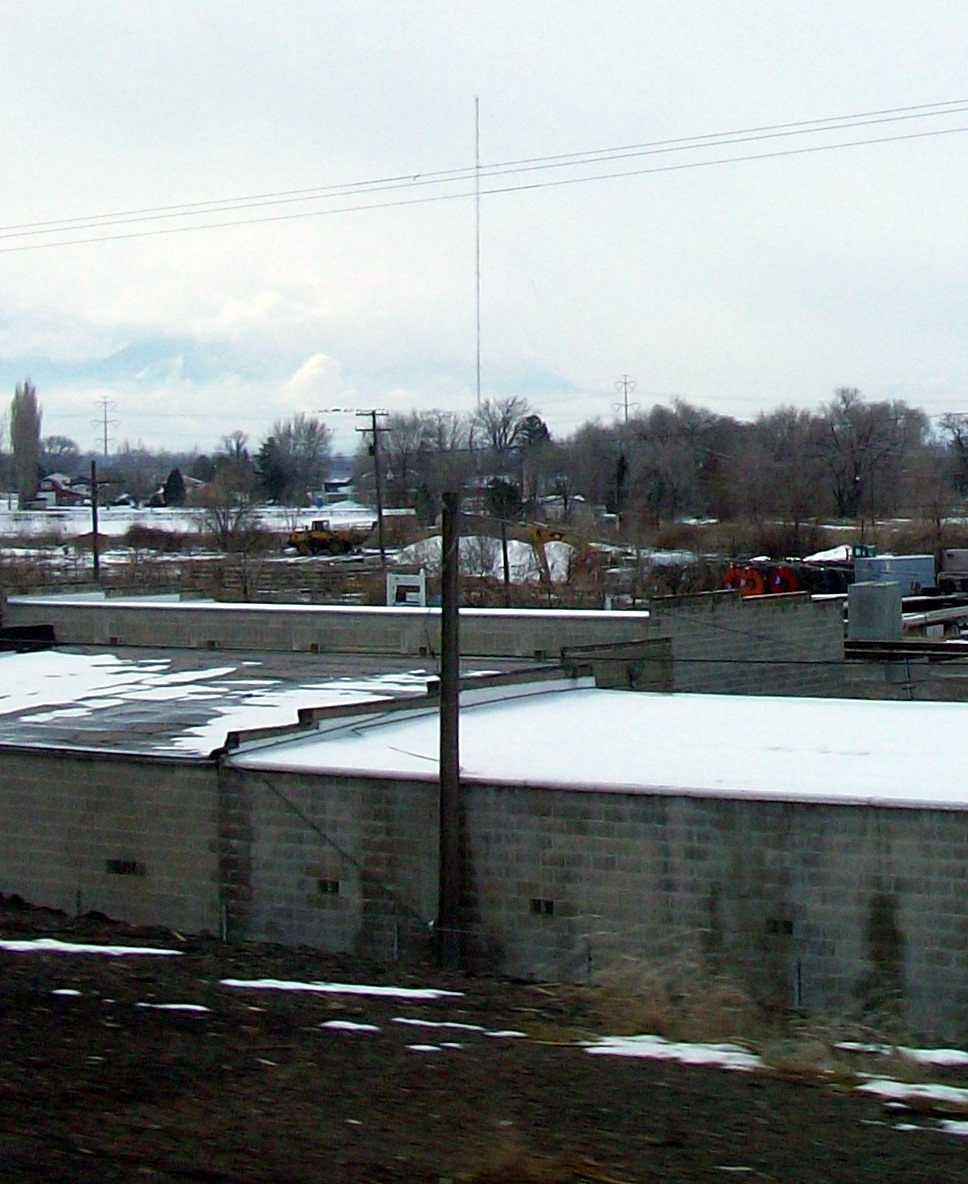
Prior to collapse, KIXR's radio tower was located near Interstate 15 in Orem, Utah

KIXR (1400 AM, "Kix Radio 1400 AM") is a radio station licensed to Provo, Utah. The station originates from a studio located in Heber City, Utah. The station airs a talk radio format. KIXR also has a sister station, 96.7 KUTN. The station is owned by Mid-Utah Media Group.

== History ==
This station originally signed on as KCSU on November 23, 1947, and was owned and operated by Frank and Harold VanWagenen. The callsign changed to KIXX in 1958. The VanWagenens operated the station with studios and a transmitter at the edge of a golf course south of Provo until 1972 when it was sold to Mesa Broadcasting Corp., with headquarters in Grand Junction, Colorado. Former KOIL air personality Larry Cobb, was CEO of the 3-station chain, with sister stations in Grand Junction and Cheyenne, Wyoming. In early 1973 it became a country music station. The original country Program Director was Les Bagley, who later went on to WPOC in Baltimore, Maryland.

In 1976, the station was sold again, this time to country music singer and songwriter Whispering Bill Anderson of Nashville, Tennessee. The call letters were changed to KFTN, which emphasized the frequency of 1400 ("FTN" was fourteen, abbreviated). While the station was owned by Bill Anderson, the official title of ownership was "Whisper Communications of Nashville, a division of Stallion Music." Stallion Music was Bill Anderson's music publishing company.

The station again sold in 1981, still playing country, and changed its calls to KXYC on March 1, 1985. From May 1, 1985, to January 1, 1995, the station played nonstop Sunday music. On January 2, 1995, the station played show tunes, and then settled on soft adult contemporary music. The station has played the "Sounds of Sunday" for 20 years.

The station changed ownership in 1986, while the station was still known as KXYC. Many listeners heard the call letters as KXYZ, so in 1987, the calls became KSRR. This last change took effect on October 1, 1987.

The call sign KSRR was previously used by an FM rock music station operating at 96.5 MHz in Houston, Texas, up until October 15, 1986. That station is currently known as KHMX.

In 2017, the station went silent after the original tower near I-15 collapsed, while owned by Zeta Holdings, LLC. The station was then sold to a Utah County-based company Lucky Dog Broadcasting on December 20, 2018. The sale was consummated on May 21, 2019. On January 29, 2021, the station returned to air while a new tower was being built by the current owners. The previous tower collapse brought about several STAs with the FCC while the station worked to replace it. As of November 16, 2021, KWLO 1580 and its FM translator on 99.9 began broadcasting a repeating message telling listeners that "Utah's Goat" had moved to 96.7 FM, KQMB flipped to a classic hit format branded as Utah's Goat 96.7. Lucky Dog Broadcasting had been leasing the 1580 and 99.9 frequencies from owner RAMS III under a local marketing agreement (LMA); and due to the COVID-19 pandemic, Lucky Dog was unable to consummate the sale of KWLO and its associated translator. The new owner of 1580 and 99.9 was scheduled to take over operations of those frequencies beginning December 1, 2021. However, the transfer of station ownership was delayed by several months. Programming from Iglesia Pentecostal Vispera Del Fin began airing on KWLO on April 13, 2022. On March 31, 2022, it was announced that Sanpete County Broadcasting Co. had filed with the FCC to purchase KQMB and KSRR from Frank Mueller's Lucky Dog Broadcasting for $170,000. On August 31, 2022, the sale of KSRR, KQMB and K244DH from Lucky Dog Broadcasting to Sanpete County Broadcasting was consummated with the FCC. On October 6, 2022, Sanpete County Broadcasting applied to change the KSRR call letters to KIXR, then KIXR changed its branding to KIX Radio 1400 AM, and it joined the Fox News Radio. The KIXR call letters were assigned by the FCC on October 27, 2022. On October 13, 2022, KQMB was granted a "license to cover" by the FCC. On November 2, 2022, Sanpete County Broadcasting submitted a request to the FCC to change KQMB's call sign to KUTN. The change was approved by the FCC on November 9, 2022. On November 7, 2022, KUTN changed its branding to "Flashback 96.7" or in other words "96.7 Flashback".

On June 5th, 2025. KTMP dropped its Classic hits programming and began a talk format simulcasting KIXR with the branding as "The Voice of the Valley 94.5 & 1340 AM". The Peak can be heard on KKUT-HD2 or on 92.9 K225AP in Heber City and online.

== Signal ==
The station's signal reaches throughout Utah County and into southern Salt Lake County. It broadcasts 1,000 watts in a non-directional pattern from a tower located in Provo, Utah.
