= KTMP =

Simulcasts KIXR, Provo
- Heber City, Utah; United States
- Broadcast area: Heber City/Park City
- Frequency: 1340 kHz
- Branding: The Voice of the Valley 1340 & 1400 AM

Programming
- Format: Talk
- Network: Fox News Radio
- Affiliations: Compass Media Networks; Salem Radio Network

Ownership
- Owner: Mid-Utah Media Group; (Sanpete County Broadcasting Co.)
- Sister stations: KKUT, KIXR, KUTN

History
- First air date: 1981 (as KLVR)
- Former call signs: KLVR (1981–1986)

Technical information
- Licensing authority: FCC
- Facility ID: 14478
- Class: C
- Power: 1,000 watts
- Transmitter coordinates: 40°30′2″N 111°26′55″W
- Translator: 94.5 K233DP (Heber City)

Links
- Public license information: Public file; LMS
- Webcast: Listen Live
- Website: talkofutahcounty.com

KTMP (1340 AM) is a radio station broadcasting a talk radio format. Licensed to Heber City, Utah, United States, the station is currently owned by Mid-Utah Media Group, through licensee Sanpete County Broadcasting Co.

== History ==
The station was assigned the call letters KLVR on July 27, 1981.

In March 1986, Majestic Broadcasting Inc. agreed to sell KLVR to Creek Broadcasting Corporation for $153,838. The sellers were associated with the Howard Johnson family. The buyers were Kathleen Davis and Larry Mahoney. The station subsequently adopted the call sign KTMP, which refers to Mount Timpanogos.

In 2005, the station's broadcast license expired after Creek Broadcasting failed to properly file its renewal application. The Federal Communications Commission notified the licensee that its authority to operate had terminated and deleted the station's call letters from its database. In October 2007, the FCC granted the station's renewal application and reinstated its call sign. The commission also proposed a $2,500 forfeiture against Creek Broadcasting for violations involving its license renewal and public inspection file.

In September 2017, the FCC approved the transfer of the station's license from Creek Broadcasting Corporation to Air-Free Wireless, Inc. In March 2018, Air-Free Wireless filed to transfer the station to Sanpete County Broadcasting Company.

In July 2018, the Heber Valley Chamber of Commerce recognized KTMP as its Business of the Month. An accompanying profile identified Doug Barton and his son-in-law Beau Lund as the station's owners and highlighted its local news, weather, community programming and coverage of Wasatch High School sports.

On June 16, 2025, KTMP changed from a classic hits format to news/talk programming under the branding "The Voice of the Valley".

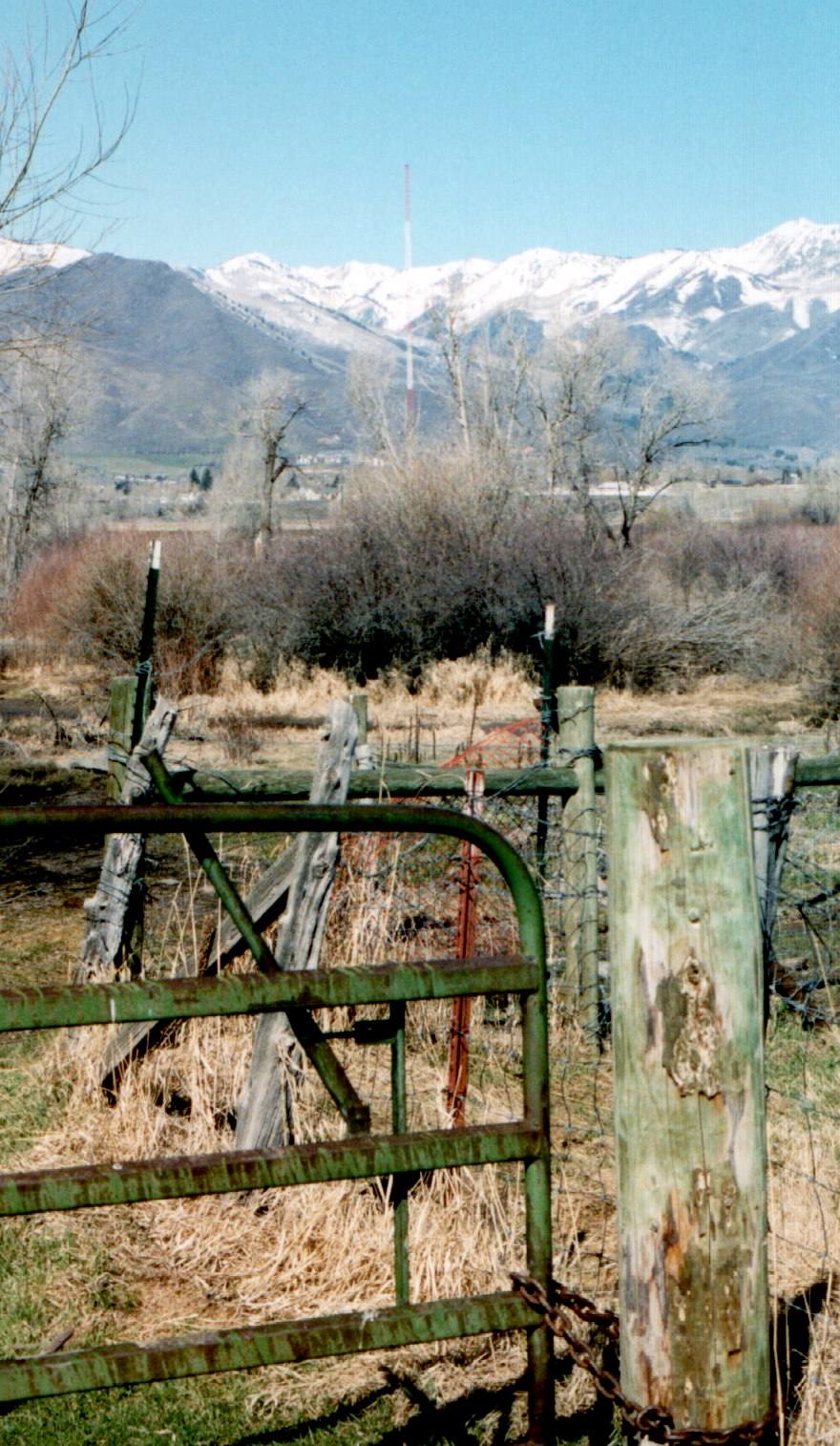
The radio tower for KTMP, located near Heber City.
