= Samuel Newhouse =

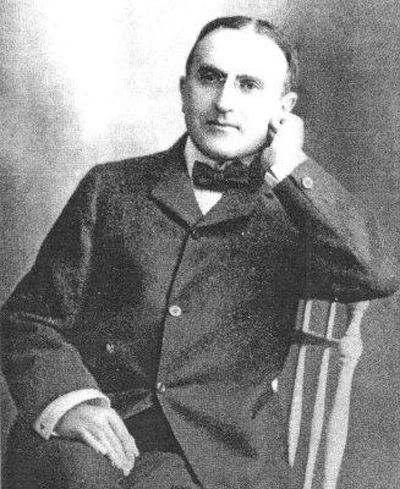
- Samuel Newhouse
- Born: October 18, 1853; New York City, U.S.
- Died: September 22, 1930 (aged 77)
- Occupation(s): Entrepreneur, mining magnate
- Known for: Developing Bingham Canyon Mine, founding Newhouse, Utah, and other mining ventures
- Spouse: Ida Stingly

Samuel Newhouse (October 18, 1853 – September 22, 1930) was an American entrepreneur and mining magnate.

== Life and career ==
Newhouse was born in New York City to European Jewish immigrant parents, and later studied and practiced law in Pennsylvania. He moved to Colorado in 1879. In Leadville, he became involved in the freighting business.

In 1883, he married Ida Stingly, whose mother ran a local boarding house. She was 16 at the time. While they ran a hotel in Leadville, Samuel acquired mining properties in Ouray, Colorado. He later sold these for several million dollars and moved to Denver, where he became a speculator and promoter, with extensive contacts back East and in Europe.

In 1896, he moved to Utah, where partnering with Thomas Weir, he became instrumental in securing English investment in the fledgling copper mining operation in Bingham canyon, which later became the great Bingham Canyon Mine. He also developed silver mining in the San Francisco Mountains near Beaver, Utah, investing approximately $2 million to build a mine, mill and develop the town of Newhouse, named after himself. He was instrumental in driving the Newhouse Tunnel (now called the Argo Tunnel), a major mine drainage tunnel in Idaho Springs, Colorado.

He maintained residences on Long Island and in London, and a chateau in France. He preferred living in Salt Lake City, where he developed a large tract of downtown, trying to shift the center of town four blocks south from Temple Square. He built the city's first skyscrapers, the Boston and Newhouse buildings, both 11 stories tall.

At one time he owned the lot where the future Flatiron Building in New York City would be located. However, "his financial empire crashed in 1916".
