= KWLO (AM) =

Radio station in Provo, Utah

- Springville, Utah; United States
- Broadcast area: Utah Valley and vicinity
- Frequency: 1580 kHz
- Branding: La Estacion de la Familia

Programming
- Language: Spanish
- Format: Contemporary Christian

Ownership
- Owner: Iglesia Pentecostal Víspera del Fin

History
- First air date: 2018

Technical information
- Licensing authority: FCC
- Facility ID: 161249
- Class: B
- Power: 1,000 watts (day); 380 watts (night)
- Transmitter coordinates: 40°12′22″N 111°40′14″W
- Translator: 99.9 K260DS (Provo)

Links
- Public license information: Public file; LMS

KWLO (1580 AM) is a radio station serving the Provo–Springville area. The station is owned by Iglesia Pentecostal Víspera del Fin, broadcasting a Spanish-language contemporary Christian format.

KWLO shares towers with KOVO 960, located just southwest of Provo near Interstate 15. K260DS, 99.9 FM is located atop West Mountain, west of Springville.

== History ==
KWLO started as a construction permit owned by RAMS III in 2009, but did not make it to air for another eight years. It originally signed on with a classic country format. On January 1, 2019, the station flipped to classic hits as Utah's Goat, also simulcasting on the translator station 99.9 K260DS in Provo, Utah.

In 2019, Lucky Dog Broadcasting took over the station under a local marketing agreement. Rams III had also reached an agreement to sell KWLO and K260DS to Lucky Dog for $300,000, but due to delays in getting a loan to cover the purchase, the sale was never consummated. In November 2021, the Utah's Goat format was moved to Lucky Dog's KQMB and KKUT-HD2, and the station began stunting with a looping message redirecting listeners to the new signals.

On February 11, 2022, KWLO and K260DS were sold to Spanish-language Christian broadcaster Iglesia Pentecostal Vispera Del Fin for $300,000. KPVO/Fountain Green was also sold to Iglesia Pentecostal Vispera Del Fin for $25,000 in a separate transaction.
