= Frisco Peak =

Peak in Utah, United States

Coordinates: 38°31′13″N 113°17′15″W

Frisco Peak is a summit near the north‑center edge of Beaver County, Utah, United States.

== Description ==
At an elevation of 9,629 feet (2,935 m), it is the highest peak within the San Francisco Mountains. It looks over the Wah Wah Valley to the west. Because of its relative location and elevation, it is the site of multiple radio transmission facilities.

The name of the peak is a contraction of the mountain range in which it is located.

== See also ==
- List of mountains in Utah
