= Crystal Springs, West Virginia =

Unincorporated community in West Virginia, United States

Crystal Springs
- Unincorporated community
- Location within the state of West Virginia Crystal Springs (the United States)
- Coordinates: 38°56′27″N 79°52′38″W
- Country: United States
- State: West Virginia
- County: Randolph
- Elevation: 1,916 ft (584 m)

Population (2000)
  - Total: 145
- Time zone: UTC-5 (Eastern (EST))
  - Summer (DST): UTC-4 (EDT)
- GNIS ID: 1550854

Crystal Springs is an unincorporated community in Randolph County, West Virginia, United States.
