= Crystal Springs, Ohio =

Unincorporated community in Ohio, U.S.

Coordinates: 40°50′57″N 81°32′3″W

Crystal Springs is an unincorporated community in Stark County, in the U.S. state of Ohio.

== History ==
A post office was established at Crystal Springs in 1874, and remained in operation until 1916. Besides the post office, Crystal Springs had a gristmill.
