= Wah Wah Valley =

Valley in Utah, United States

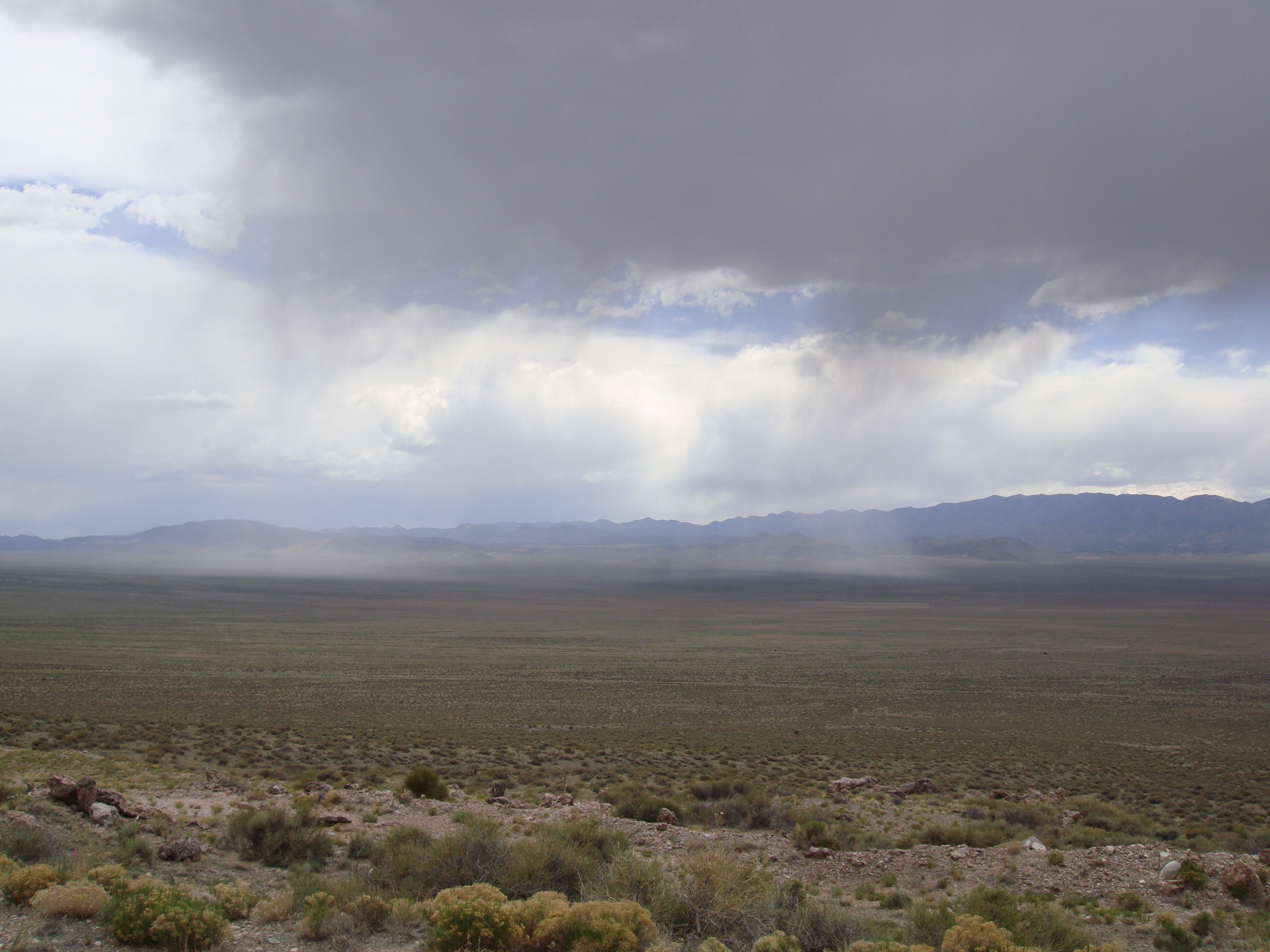
- A spring storm hits the Wah Wah Valley, May 2009

- Location within Utah Location within the United States
- Floor elevation: 4,577 feet (1,395 m)

Geography
- Location: Beaver and Millard counties, Utah, United States
- Coordinates: 38°43′20″N 113°15′35″W
- Traversed by: State Route 21
- Interactive map of Wah Wah Valley

Wah Wah Valley is an endorheic (no external drainage) valley within the Basin and Range of west-central Utah, United States.

== Description ==
The valley is bound by the Wah Wah Mountains to the west and south and the San Francisco Mountains to the east. The northern part of the valley bifurcates around the southern end of the House Range, leading into Tule Valley to the northwest and the Sevier Desert-(Sevier Lake region), to the northeast.

The "Wah Wah" name comes from Wah Wah Springs, on the eastern slope of the Wah Wah Mountain range. "Wah Wah" is reported to mean "good clear water".

The lowest point in Beaver County is located just south of the Wah Wah Hardpan (dry lake), at the Millard County line.

The valley is sparsely populated today, but it has had residents in the past, like in the ghost town of Newhouse. These people moved here for mining, but later, the region was used for grazing.

== See also ==
- List of valleys of Utah
