= Frisco, Utah =

- Ghost town
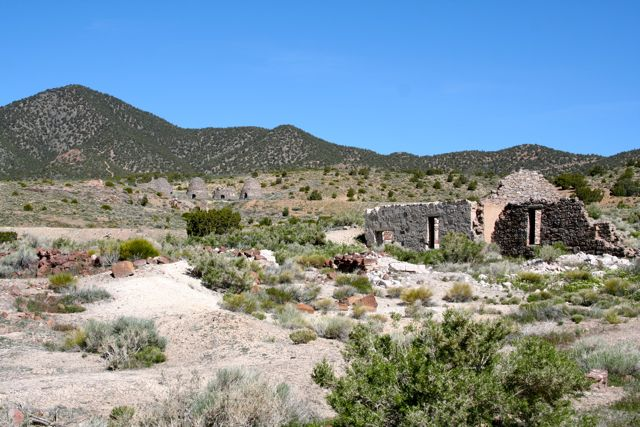
- Remains of Frisco. The charcoal kilns in the background are listed on the National Register of Historic Places.

- Location within Utah Location within the United States
- Coordinates: 38°27′35″N 113°15′32″W
- Country: United States
- State: Utah
- County: Beaver
- Established: 1879
- Abandoned: 1929
- Named for: San Francisco Mountains
- Elevation: 6,421 ft (1,957 m)
- GNIS feature ID: 1437563

Frisco is a ghost town in Beaver County, Utah, United States. It was an active mining camp from 1879 to 1929. At its peak in 1885, Frisco was a thriving town of 6,000 people.

== History ==
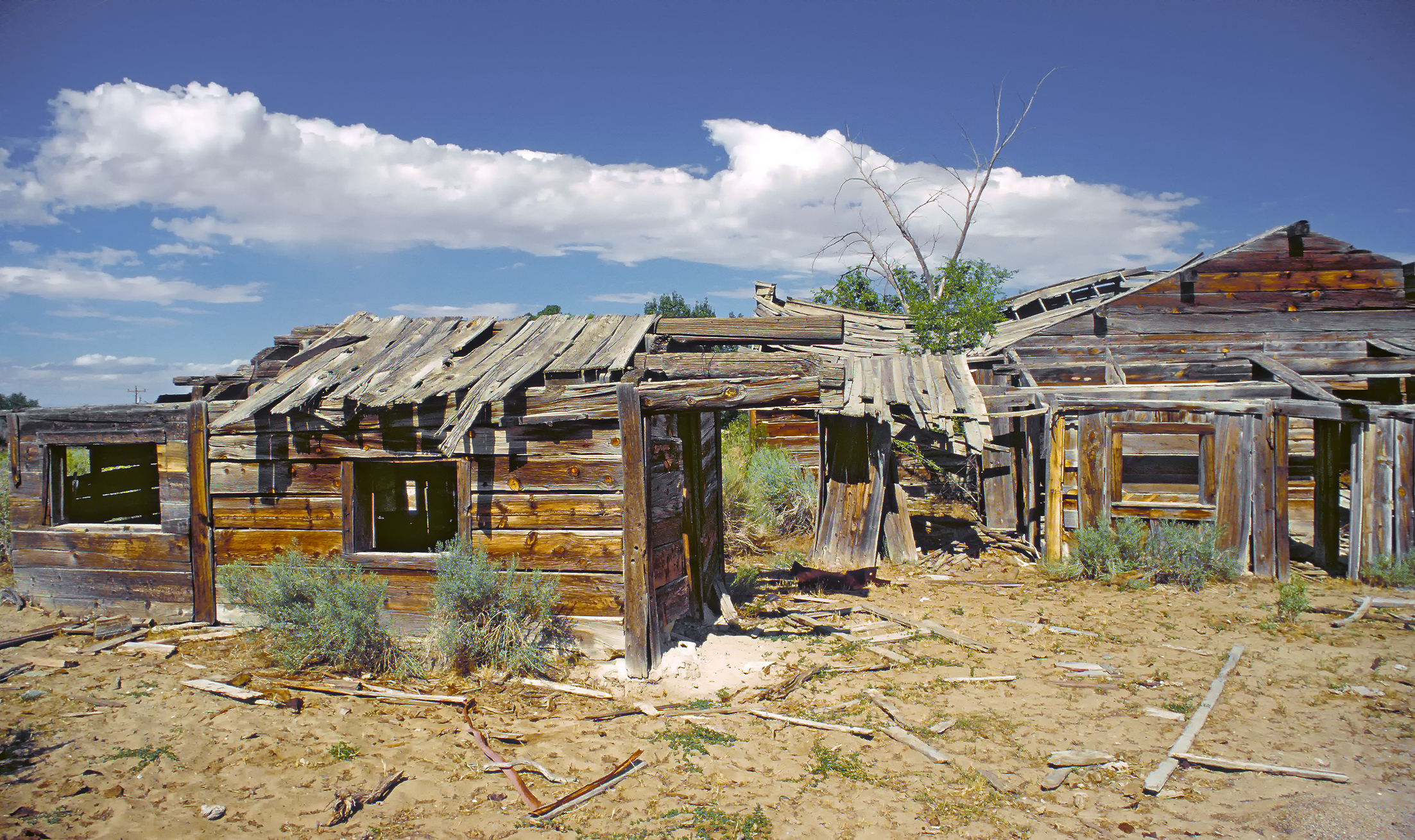
Dilapidated buildings in the ghost town of Frisco in 1997.

Frisco developed as the post office and commercial center for the San Francisco Mining District, and was the terminus of the Utah Southern Railroad extension from Milford. The Horn Silver Mine was discovered in 1875, and had produced $20,267,078 worth of ore by 1885. By 1885, over $60,000,000 worth of zinc, copper, lead, silver, and gold had been transported from Frisco from the many mines in the area.

With 23 saloons, Frisco was known as the wildest town in the Great Basin. Murder was common, and drinking water had to be freighted in. Some sources point to a sheriff from Pioche Nevada who was hired to come and clean up the town. Sheriff Pearson made clear he was not to be doubted and allegedly killed six men during his first night on the job though part if this story has likely been embellished over time.

Frisco's fortunes changed suddenly on February 13, 1885, when the Horn Silver Mine caved in completely. It was an unconventional mine, an open pit 900 feet (270 m) deep braced with timbers, and could have collapsed at any time.

In 1905 a Mormon ward was organized, but in 1911, with the closing of many of the mines, so many church members had left that the ward was discontinued. After many years of desertion, another company made an attempt to mine here in 2002.

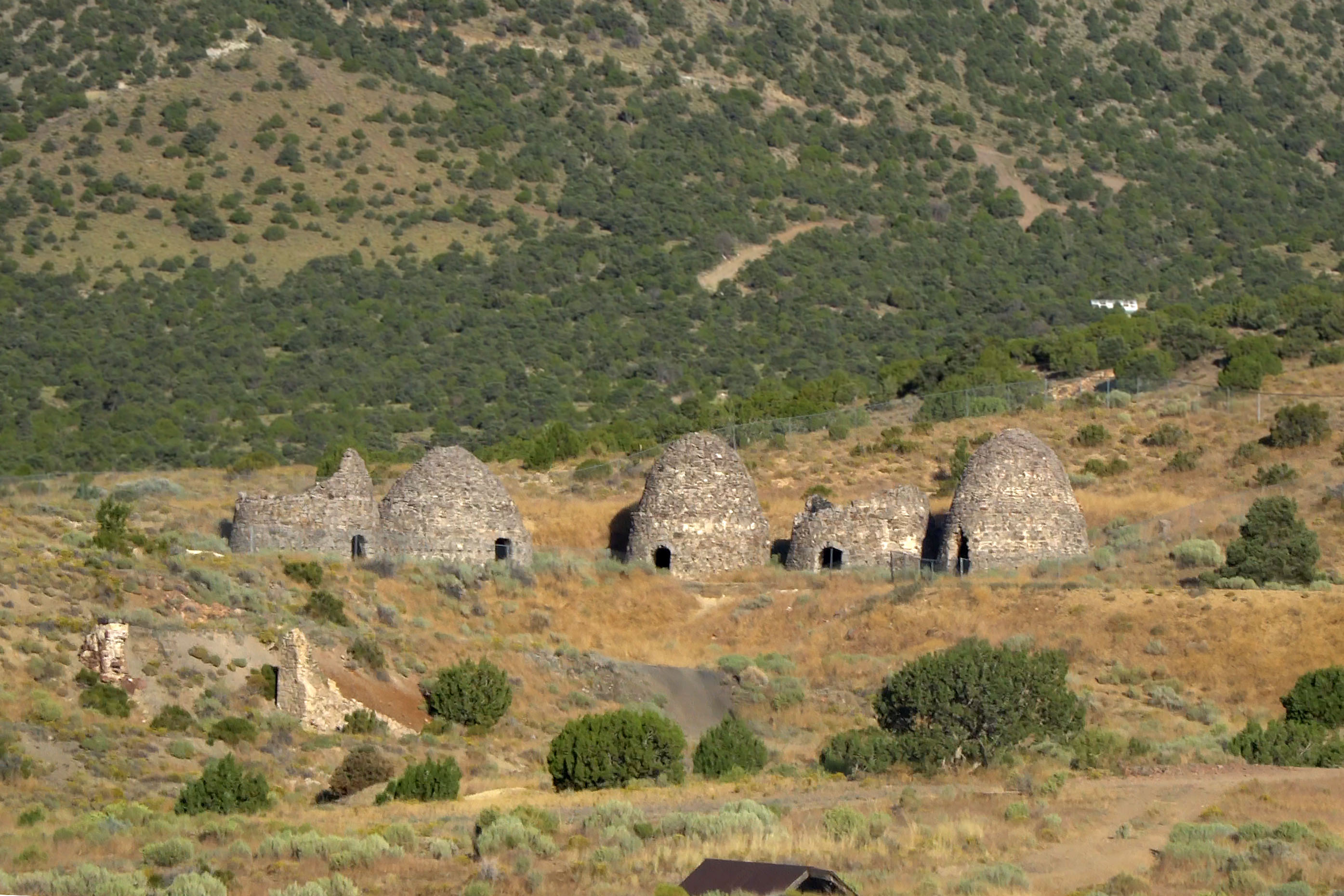
The charcoal kilns at frisco

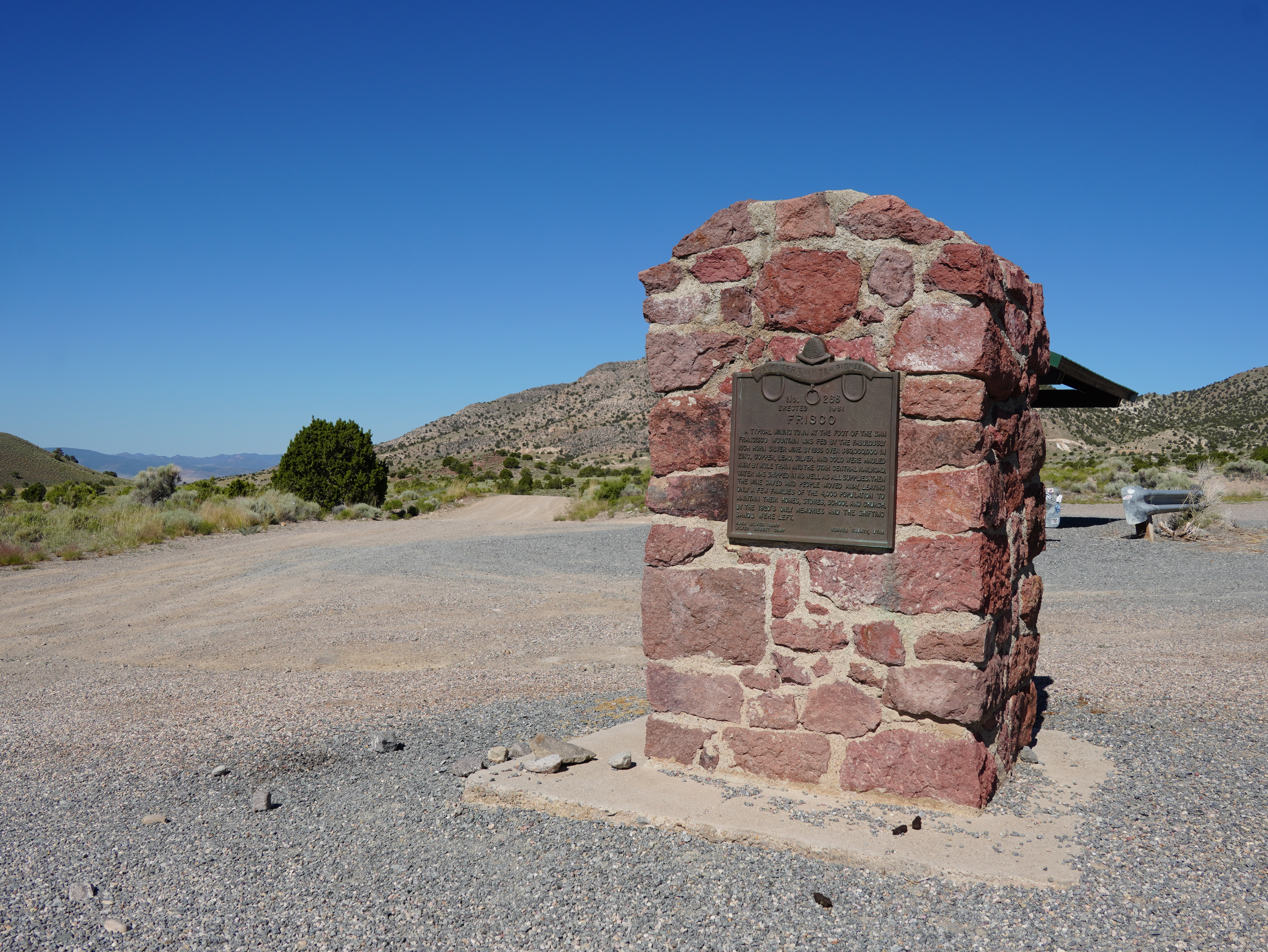
Frisco Historical Marker in 2023

== Geography ==
Frisco is located at 38°27′35″N 113°15′32″W. Its elevation is 6,500 feet (2,000 m).

== Demographics ==
The peak population was nearly 6,000.

Year	Population
1880	800
1900	500
1912	150
1918	300
1922–1923	100
1927–1928	100

== See also ==
- Silver mining in the United States
