= Black Rock, Millard County, Utah =

Black Rock, Utah
- Unincorporated community
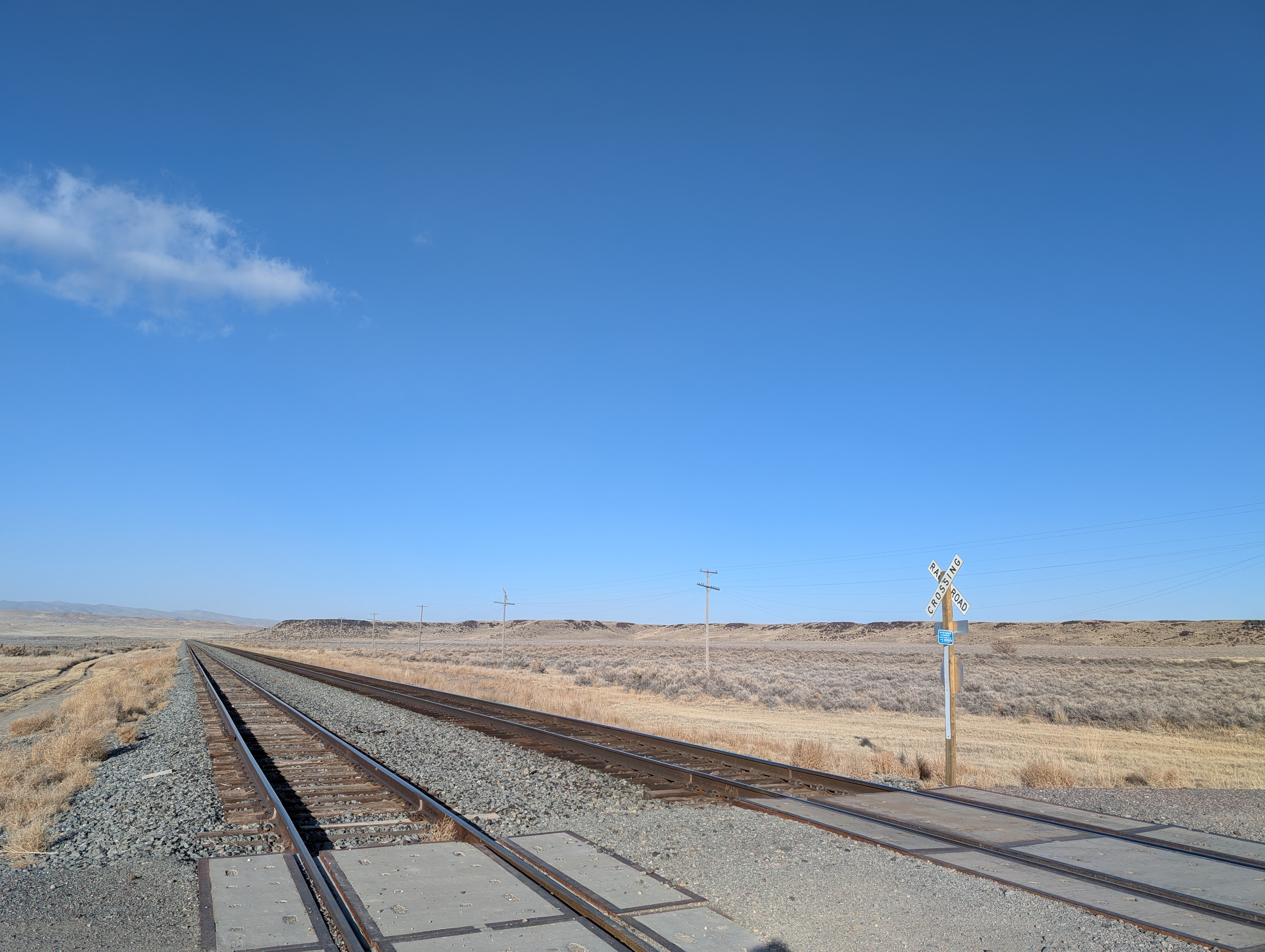
- Railroad crossing in Black Rock with the namesake black rock formations in the background.

- Location within Utah Location within the United States
- Coordinates: 38.70833°N 112.95833°W
- Country: United States
- State: Utah
- County: Millard
- Founded: 1876
- Abandoned: 1959
- Elevation: 4,856 ft (1,480 m)
- GNIS feature ID: 1425709

Black Rock is an unincorporated community and near-ghost town in the Beaver Bottoms in southern Millard County, Utah, United States, approximately 20 miles (32 km) north of Milford.

== Description ==
Historical population
Census	Pop.	Note	%±
1900	61		—
1910	52		−14.8%
1920	41		−21.2%
1930	72		75.6%
1940	46		−36.1%
1950	19		−58.7%
Source: US Census Bureau

The town was a station stop on the Los Angeles and Salt Lake Railroad (later Union Pacific Railroad), and was a community center for the few settlers in the area during the late nineteenth century. As area roads and vehicular travel improved beginning in the twentieth century, its relative importance waned. A post office operated at Black Rock from 1891 to 1959. The site is now a ghost town although there is at least one occupied home in or near the town.

The town was named for a nearby rock formation.

== Climate ==
Climate data for Black Rock, Utah(1991-2020 normals, extremes since Dec 1900)
Month	Jan	Feb	Mar	Apr	May	Jun	Jul	Aug	Sep	Oct	Nov	Dec	Year
Record high °F (°C)	68.0 (20.0)	75.0 (23.9)	86.0 (30.0)	93.0 (33.9)	99.0 (37.2)	106.0 (41.1)	108.0 (42.2)	105.1 (40.6)	102.0 (38.9)	90.0 (32.2)	80.1 (26.7)	66.9 (19.4)	108.0 (42.2)
Mean daily maximum °F (°C)	42.3 (5.7)	49.1 (9.5)	60.7 (15.9)	67.5 (19.7)	76.9 (24.9)	87.7 (30.9)	94.6 (34.8)	91.9 (33.3)	82.5 (28.1)	68.9 (20.5)	54.4 (12.4)	42.0 (5.6)	68.2 (20.1)
Daily mean °F (°C)	29.3 (−1.5)	34.9 (1.6)	43.6 (6.4)	49.5 (9.7)	58.0 (14.4)	67.4 (19.7)	75.1 (23.9)	72.9 (22.7)	63.2 (17.3)	50.6 (10.3)	38.5 (3.6)	28.7 (−1.8)	51.0 (10.5)
Mean daily minimum °F (°C)	16.3 (−8.7)	20.8 (−6.2)	26.6 (−3.0)	31.6 (−0.2)	39.0 (3.9)	47.1 (8.4)	55.5 (13.1)	53.8 (12.1)	43.8 (6.6)	32.4 (0.2)	22.5 (−5.3)	15.5 (−9.2)	33.7 (1.0)
Record low °F (°C)	−33.0 (−36.1)	−27.9 (−33.3)	−13.0 (−25.0)	0.0 (−17.8)	17.1 (−8.3)	24.1 (−4.4)	30.0 (−1.1)	28.0 (−2.2)	17.1 (−8.3)	−6.0 (−21.1)	−18.9 (−28.3)	−36.9 (−38.3)	−36.9 (−38.3)
Average precipitation inches (mm)	0.59 (15)	0.72 (18)	0.84 (21)	0.95 (24)	0.93 (24)	0.46 (12)	0.58 (15)	0.73 (19)	0.70 (18)	0.98 (25)	0.61 (15)	0.71 (18)	8.8 (224)
Average snowfall inches (cm)	5.5 (14)	4.7 (12)	3.0 (7.6)	1.7 (4.3)	0.1 (0.25)	0.0 (0.0)	0.0 (0.0)	0.0 (0.0)	0.0 (0.0)	0.1 (0.25)	2.4 (6.1)	6.2 (16)	23.7 (60.5)
Average precipitation days (≥ 0.01 in)	4.3	5	4.8	5.9	5.3	3	4.1	4.7	3.8	4.4	3.5	4.5	53.3
Average snowy days (≥ 0.01 in)	1.9	1.4	0.8	0.4	0	0	0	0	0	0	0.9	2	7.4

== See also ==
- List of ghost towns in Utah
