= Sevier Lake =

Intermittent lake in Millard County, Utah, United States

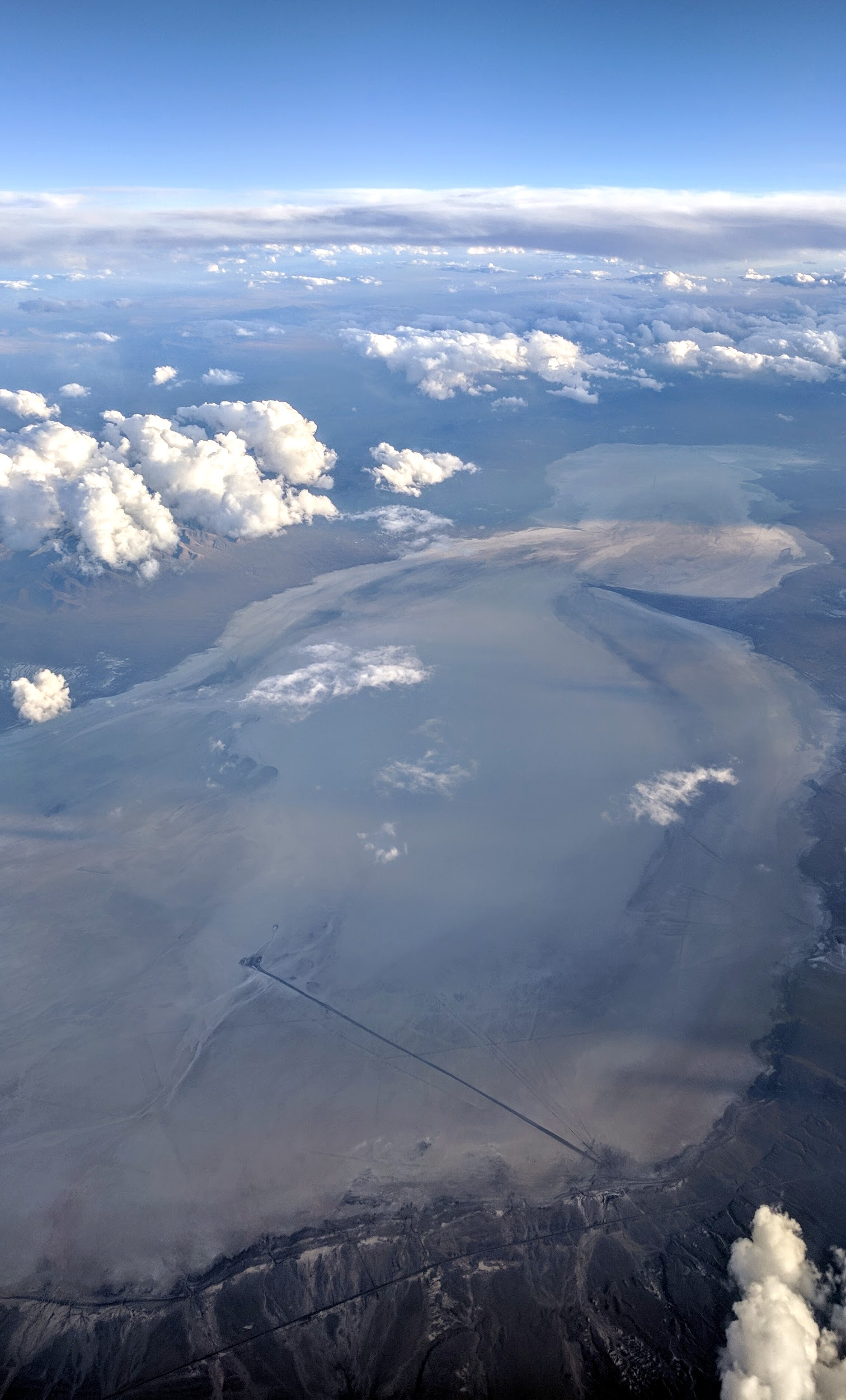
- Sevier Lake aerial view from the north

- Location within Utah Location within the United States
- Location: Millard County, Utah, United States
- Coordinates: 38°56′20″N 113°09′43″W
- Type: intermittent endorheic
- Primary inflows: Beaver and Sevier rivers
- Basin countries: United States
- Surface elevation: 4,550 ft (1,390 m)

Sevier Lake /sɛˈvɪər/ is an intermittent and endorheic lake which lies in the lowest part of the Sevier Desert, Millard County, Utah, United States. Like Great Salt Lake and Utah Lake, it is a remnant of Pleistocene Lake Bonneville. Sevier Lake is fed primarily by the Beaver and Sevier rivers, and the additional inflow is from the lake's watershed that is part of the Escalante–Sevier hydrologic subregion. The lake has been mostly dry throughout recorded history and its dry lakebed is a source of wind-blown dust.

== History ==
The first recorded observation was in 1872, which stated that the lake's surface area was 188 square miles (490 km^{2}), salinity was measured at 86 parts per thousand, two and a half times that of the ocean, and maximum depth was 15 feet (4.6 m). In January 1880, the lake was nearly dry and had been so for the past one or two years. The Sevier River, which once flowed to the lake, is now largely diverted for irrigation. In 1987 however, the lake was again similar to the recorded description of 1872.

The Domínguez–Escalante expedition named it "Laguna de Miera" after Bernardo de Miera y Pacheco, a cartographer on their 1776 expedition. In 1825, trappers working for William Henry Ashley trapped the region, and Jedediah Smith named it after him, the Ashley Lake. On some maps, it was named after Joseph Nicollet in the mid-19th century. The lake is currently named for the river, which is derived from "Río Severo" (wild river [Wild in modern Spanish is Salvaje or Silvestre]), a local name given by early Spanish explorers.

== Water ==
In late 2011, due to an unusually wet year, many man-made reservoirs in Millard County began dumping excess water through the Sevier River onto the Sevier Lake bed. Standing water existed on the playa for the first time since 1984 and extended down past Needle Point, which is the feature seen on the west edge of the lake. In the deepest points, water levels were over three feet deep. Due to high salinity content, of over 20% TDS, the water never fully froze from the winter temperatures, which were well below 32 °F (0 °C), except near the inlet of the Sevier River.

== Potash mining ==
In 2018, Crystal Peak Minerals, Inc. (CPM) announced a development-stage potassium sulfate (SOP) project for Sevier Dry Lake. The company stated that extensive exploration drilling and other test work had been completed across the playa. In 2018, CPM also published an NI 43-101 feasibility study for the production of potassium sulfate. The study forecasted average annual SOP production over the 30-year life of the project of approximately 298,000 metric tonnes of potassium sulfate. The federal government approved the project in August 2019. Reporting in 2019 suggested that, over the project's 30-year life, potash production could reach 372,000 tons a year.

In December 2021, CPM was absorbed by the Canadian gold company Western Exploration and announced a focus solely on gold mining at the Aura site north of Elko, NV. The companies made no further mention about plans for potash mining at Sevier Dry Lake.

On July 31, 2023, the Southern Utah Wilderness Alliance filed a lawsuit alleging that the Bureau of Land Management "failed to consider alternatives that would cause fewer environmental impacts" when it approved a proposal by Peak Minerals, Inc. to mine potash from the lake.

== Climate ==
Climate data for years 1987–1993 Sevier Dry Lake, Utah (elevation 4,550 ft)
Month	Jan	Feb	Mar	Apr	May	Jun	Jul	Aug	Sep	Oct	Nov	Dec	Year
Record high °F (°C)	68 (20)	69 (21)	78 (26)	86 (30)	91 (33)	102 (39)	104 (40)	102 (39)	94 (34)	87 (31)	77 (25)	60 (16)	104 (40)
Mean daily maximum °F (°C)	35.6 (2.0)	40.7 (4.8)	56.6 (13.7)	65.7 (18.7)	75.1 (23.9)	87.4 (30.8)	96.2 (35.7)	91.3 (32.9)	82.7 (28.2)	70.2 (21.2)	49.5 (9.7)	36.1 (2.3)	65.6 (18.7)
Mean daily minimum °F (°C)	8.9 (−12.8)	13.7 (−10.2)	30.6 (−0.8)	35.4 (1.9)	42.8 (6.0)	52.1 (11.2)	61.5 (16.4)	56.0 (13.3)	46.3 (7.9)	36.4 (2.4)	23.5 (−4.7)	10.7 (−11.8)	34.8 (1.6)
Record low °F (°C)	−18 (−28)	−31 (−35)	9 (−13)	14 (−10)	25 (−4)	32 (0)	49 (9)	30 (−1)	28 (−2)	20 (−7)	−7 (−22)	−21 (−29)	−31 (−35)
Average precipitation inches (mm)	0.38 (9.7)	0.39 (9.9)	1.05 (27)	0.46 (12)	0.78 (20)	0.56 (14)	0.38 (9.7)	0.75 (19)	0.49 (12)	0.89 (23)	0.45 (11)	0.36 (9.1)	6.96 (177)
Average snowfall inches (cm)	5.0 (13)	5.3 (13)	2.0 (5.1)	0.0 (0.0)	0.0 (0.0)	0.0 (0.0)	0.0 (0.0)	0.0 (0.0)	0.0 (0.0)	0.0 (0.0)	1.6 (4.1)	6.9 (18)	20.8 (53)
Source: The Western Regional Climate Center

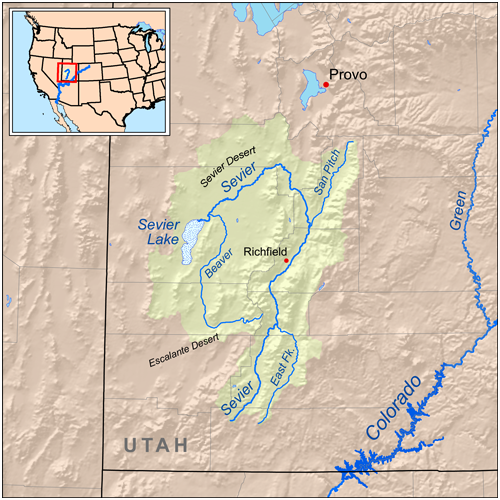
Map of the Sevier Lake drainage basin

== Gallery ==
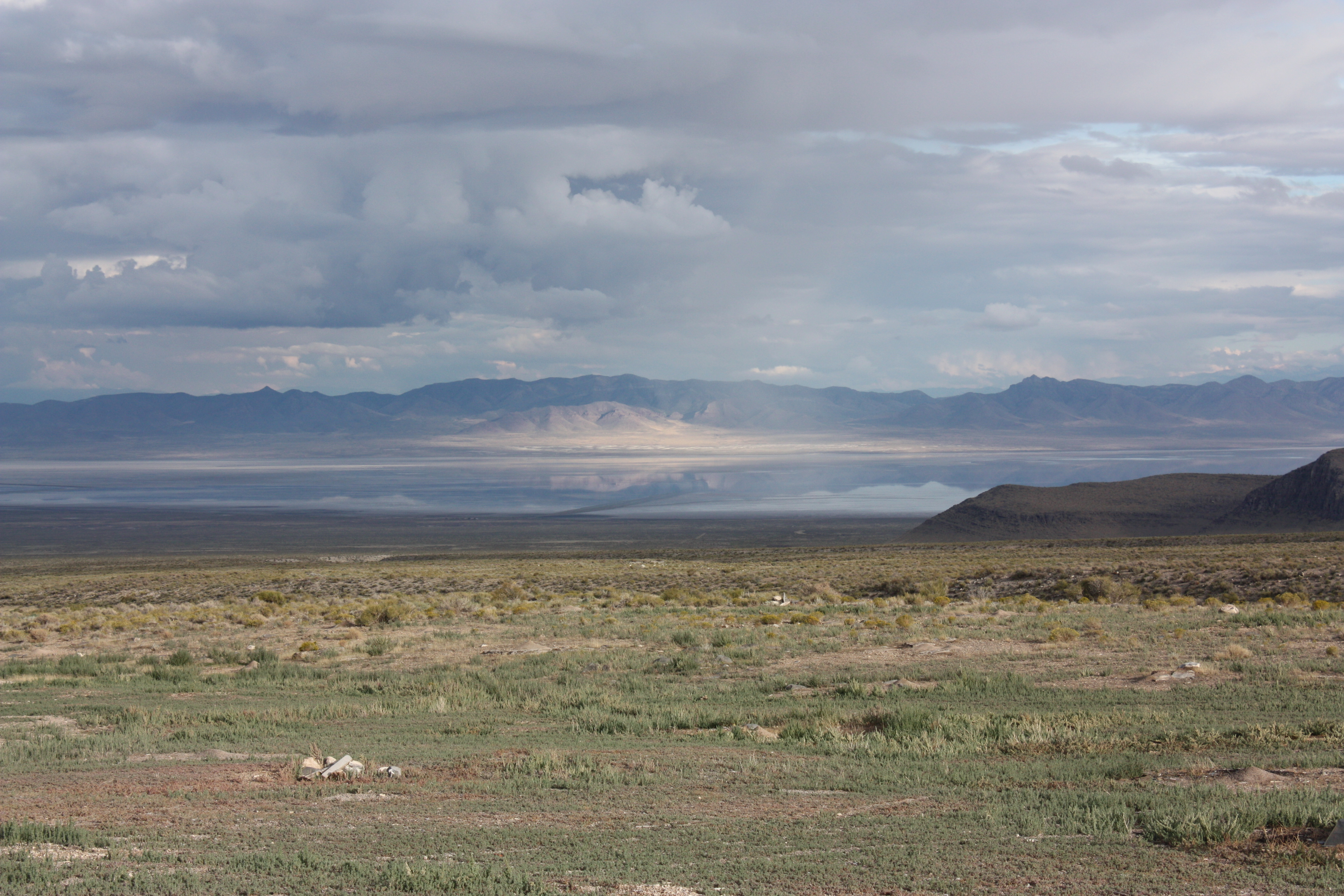
Sevier Lake after a late summer thunderstorm

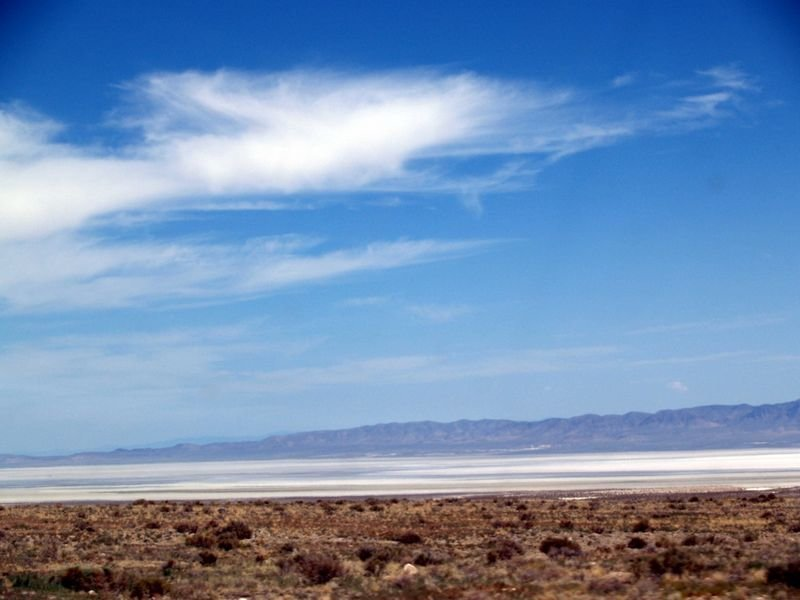
As seen from US 50 in 2009

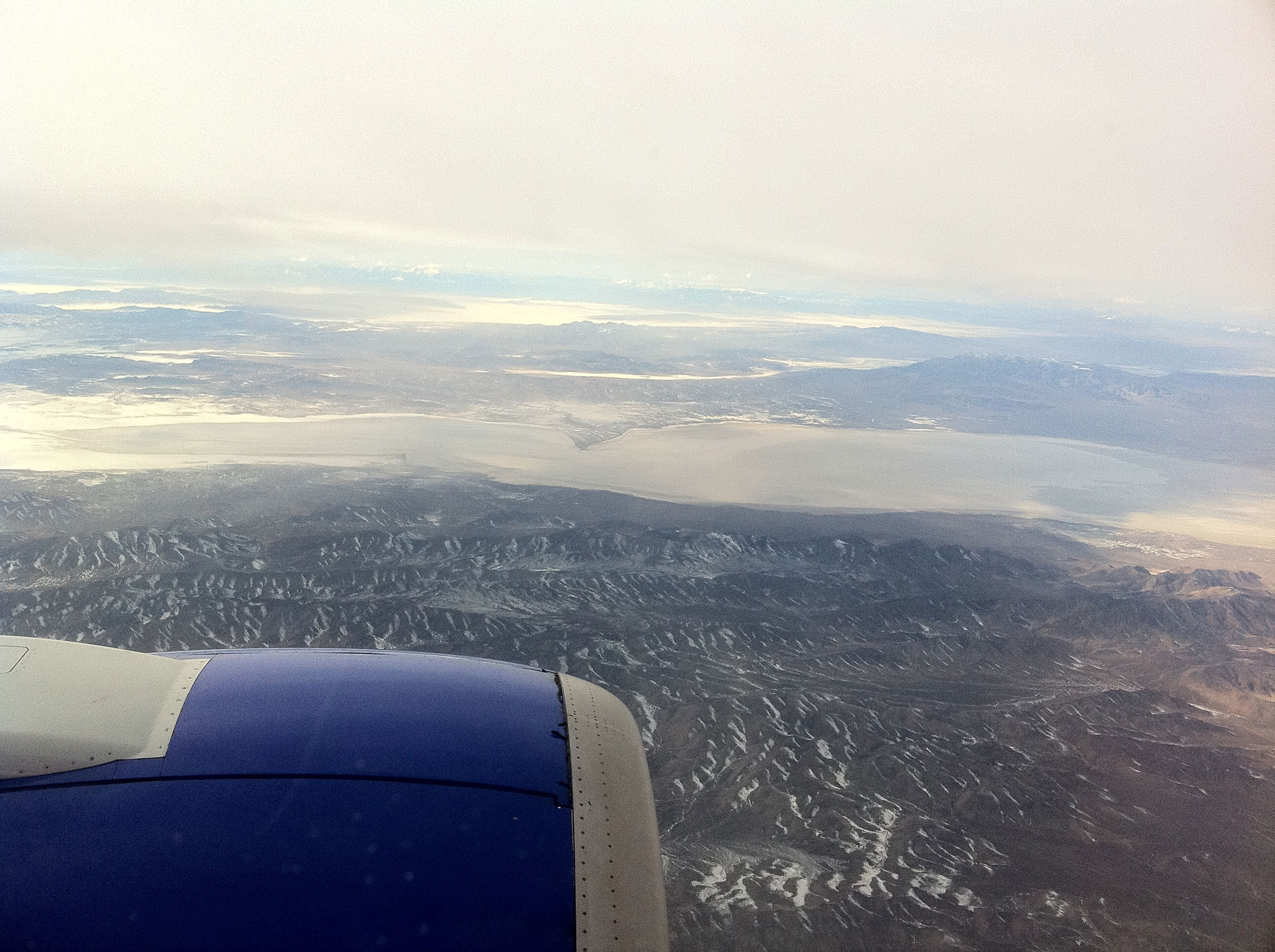
Aerial view from the east in 2011
