= National Register of Historic Places listings in Millard County, Utah =

Location of Millard County in Utah

This is a list of the National Register of Historic Places listings in Millard County, Utah.

This is intended to be a complete list of the properties and districts on the National Register of Historic Places in Millard County, Utah, United States. Latitude and longitude coordinates are provided for many National Register properties and districts; these locations may be seen together in a map.

There are 32 properties and districts listed on the National Register in the county, including 1 National Historic Landmark. One other site in the county was once listed, but has since been removed.

This National Park Service list is complete through NPS recent listings posted August 28, 2026.

== Current listings ==
	Name on the Register	Image	Date listed	Location	City or town	Description
1	Archeological Site No. 42Md300		August 6, 1980 (#80003911)	Address Restricted	Delta	A depression near the Sevier River southwest of Delta, an archaeological site that has yielded hundreds of Paleoindian artifacts.
2	Thomas Clark and Millie Callister House	Thomas Clark and Millie Callister House	January 17, 2017 (#100000511)	155 S. 100 East; 38°57′54″N 112°19′15″W	Fillmore	
3	Central Utah Relocation Center (Topaz) Site	Central Utah Relocation Center (Topaz) Site	March 29, 2007 (#07000432)	10500 W. 500 North; 39°24′40″N 112°46′20″W	Delta	
4	Cottonwood Wash (42 MD 183)		June 4, 1985 (#85001233)	Address Restricted	Milford	
5	Cove Fort	Cove Fort	October 6, 1970 (#70000623)	2 miles (3.2 km) east of Interstate 15 on State Route 161; 38°36′06″N 112°34′49″W	Cove Fort	
6	Deseret (42 MD 55)		June 4, 1985 (#85001234)	Address Restricted	Deseret	
7	Deseret Relief Society Hall	Deseret Relief Society Hall	December 13, 1995 (#95001431)	4365 S. 4000 West; 39°17′21″N 112°39′09″W	Deseret	1906-built hall
8	Desert Experimental Range Station Historic District	Desert Experimental Range Station Historic District	April 11, 1994 (#94000267)	2.5 miles (4.0 km) north of U.S. Route 21, 42 miles (68 km) west of Milford; 38°36′01″N 113°44′44″W	Milford	
9	Fillmore American Legion Hall	Fillmore American Legion Hall	January 24, 2011 (#10001174)	80 S. Main St. 38°58′02″N 112°19′26″W	Fillmore	
10	Fillmore Armory		January 4, 2021 (#100006003)	35 West Center St. 38°58′08″N 112°19′29″W	Fillmore	
11	Fillmore City Cemetery	Fillmore City Cemetery	May 9, 2012 (#12000270)	325 E. 600 South; 38°57′19″N 112°18′52″W	Fillmore	
12	Fort Deseret	Fort Deseret	October 9, 1970 (#70000624)	2 miles (3.2 km) south of Deseret on State Route 257; 39°15′54″N 112°39′13″W	Deseret	
13	George Hotel	George Hotel	June 10, 2005 (#05000594)	10 N. Main St. 38°48′06″N 112°26′13″W	Kanosh	
14	Gunnison Massacre Site	Gunnison Massacre Site	April 30, 1976 (#76001819)	6 miles (9.7 km) southwest of Hinckley on the Sevier River; 39°16′46″N 112°46′40″W	Hinckley	
15	Hinckley High School Gymnasium	Hinckley High School Gymnasium	April 1, 1985 (#85000809)	100 East south of 200 North; 39°19′34″N 112°40′09″W	Hinckley	
16	Peter and Jessie Huntsman House	Peter and Jessie Huntsman House	January 30, 1995 (#94001625)	155 W. Center St. 38°58′08″N 112°19′38″W	Fillmore	
17	Kanosh Tithing Office	Kanosh Tithing Office	January 25, 1985 (#85000263)	40 N. Main St. 38°48′08″N 112°26′11″W	Kanosh	
18	Meadow Tithing Granary		January 25, 1985 (#85000276)	50 N. 100 West; 38°53′12″N 112°24′42″W	Meadow	
19	Millard Academy	Millard Academy	February 11, 1982 (#82004127)	100 East and 200 North; 39°19′35″N 112°40′10″W	Hinckley	
20	Mountain Home Wash		June 4, 1985 (#85001235)	Address Restricted	Milford	
21	Edward and Elizabeth Partridge House	Edward and Elizabeth Partridge House	May 14, 1993 (#93000414)	10 S. 200 West; 38°58′07″N 112°19′44″W	Fillmore	
22	Pharo Village		October 10, 1975 (#75001813)	Address Restricted	Scipio	
23	The Princess Recreation Hall-Lynndyl LDS Meetinghouse	The Princess Recreation Hall-Lynndyl LDS Meetinghouse	September 17, 2014 (#14000628)	98 E. Center St. 39°31′08″N 112°22′26″W	Lynndyl	
24	Peter Quarnberg House	Peter Quarnberg House	July 26, 1982 (#82004128)	105 W. 100 South; 39°14′36″N 112°06′20″W	Scipio	
25	Merien and Rosabelle Robins House	Merien and Rosabelle Robins House	September 7, 2001 (#01000962)	110 W. 200 North; 39°14′55″N 112°06′20″W	Scipio	
26	Scipio Cooperative Mercantile Institution Building		September 8, 2020 (#100005544)	130 North State St. 39°14′50″N 112°06′14″W	Scipio	
27	Scipio Town Hall	Scipio Town Hall	December 22, 1988 (#88002999)	55 N. State St. 39°14′45″N 112°06′12″W	Scipio	PWA Moderne building intended to serve as town hall and for other civic purposes.
28	Site 42 MD 284		June 4, 1985 (#85001236)	Address Restricted	Fillmore	
29	Thuesen-Petersen House	Thuesen-Petersen House	February 1, 1983 (#83004398)	206 W. Center St. 39°14′43″N 112°06′30″W	Scipio	
30	Topaz War Relocation Center Site	Topaz War Relocation Center Site	January 2, 1974 (#74001934)	16 miles (26 km) northwest of Delta; 39°24′49″N 112°46′28″W	Delta	
31	Utah Territorial Capitol	Utah Territorial Capitol	September 22, 1970 (#70000625)	Center St. between Main and 100 West St. 38°58′04″N 112°19′28″W	Fillmore	
32	Van's Hall	Van's Hall	January 27, 1995 (#94001629)	321 W. Main St. 39°21′08″N 112°34′56″W	Delta	

== Former listing ==
	Name on the Register	Image	Date listed	Date removed	Location	City or town	Description
1	Millard High School Gymnasium	Millard High School Gymnasium	April 1, 1985 (#85000808)	September 3, 2009	35 N. 200 West; 38°58′13″N 112°19′45″W	Fillmore	

== See also ==
- List of National Historic Landmarks in Utah
- National Register of Historic Places listings in Utah
