= Thomas J. Yates =

Thomas Jarvis Yates
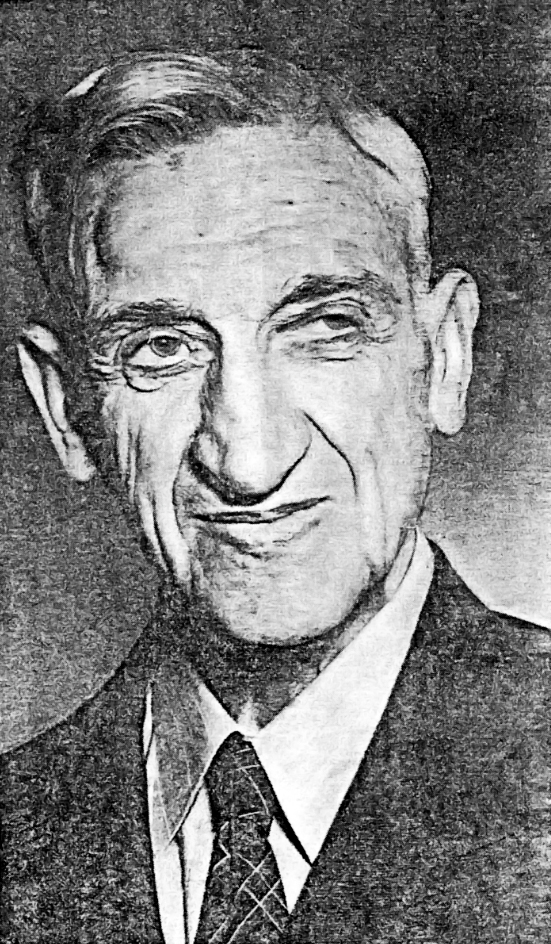
- Born: November 13, 1870; Scipio, Utah
- Died: February 8, 1958 (aged 87); Abilene, Texas
- Spouse(s): Lydia Horne (1895–1903); Lily Fairbanks (1904–)

Thomas J. Yates (November 13, 1870 – February 8, 1958) was the first seminary teacher in the Church of Jesus Christ of Latter-day Saints (LDS Church). In 1912, the first released-time seminary classes met in a building adjacent to Granite High School in Salt Lake City, Utah.

== Early life and education ==
Thomas Jarvis Yates was born November 13, 1870, to Thomas and Elizabeth Francis Yates. His parents were immigrants to the United States from England. He grew up in Scipio, Utah. As a child, he had a sense of humor and liked to pull pranks. He was a member of the LDS Church and participated in the church throughout his life. He was baptized in June 1879. His family lived on the frontier and Yates came in contact with Native Americans and stray horses on occasion. Yates also enjoyed riding and racing horses as a boy. However, he got sick frequently, including suffering from typhoid fever.

Yates attended Brigham Young Academy (BYA) in Provo, Utah, at 16 years of age. He received instruction from the head of the school, Karl G. Maeser, and other teachers such as James E. Talmage and Benjamin Cluff. He returned home for the summers in order to work. Although Yates considered leaving school, he graduated from the academy in 1891.

After graduation at age 20, Yates got a job as the principal of a school that was located in Deseret, Utah. He was also put in charge of schools in other Utah communities including Oasis, Delta, and Hinckley. After some time, Yates returned to BYA. Due to changed graduating requirements, he graduated again in 1895. While at BYA, he met Lydia Horne. The couple planned to get married in 1895; however, Yates received an assignment to serve as a missionary for the LDS Church. He decided to serve, and married Lydia on March 20, 1895, before leaving on his mission. Yates left June 1, 1895, and served for three years in the Southern States Mission, returning on July 6, 1898.

When Yates returned from his mission, he and Lydia went to Cornell University. They lived in Ithaca, New York, and he worked in a blacksmith shop. He took classes from Robert H. Thurston and Harris J. Ryan. Yates graduated in June 1902 with degrees in mechanical and electrical engineering. Afterwards, the family moved back to Utah and got jobs at different power companies. Lydia died in 1903; the couple had two daughters together. On February 24, 1904, Yates married to Lily Fairbanks. They had five daughters and three sons together.

== Career ==
Yates worked in several different power plants. He began working at the Utah Power and Light Company in July 1902 as a switchboard attendant. In 1903, he became the plant's foreman. That same year, workers at power plants in Utah went on strike, and Yates was hired to visit the different power plants and instruct workers. After that, he became superintendent of the company's power plants, a position he held from 1903 to 1906. In 1907, Yates started working as a consulting electrical engineer. He also oversaw the building of power plants including the Heber City and Murray power plants. Yates later performed tests on the New York City Subway for two years.

=== Seminary ===
Yates was a member of the LDS Church's Granite Stake. The stake decided to construct a building next to Granite High School so students could be let out of school for a religious education class during the school day. Under this system, students could attend a public high school and receive religious training at the same time. This was the beginning of the church's released-time seminary program, and was implemented in 1911, with Yates was chosen by Joseph F. Merrill to be the first released-time seminary teacher.

At the time he was selected for the position, Yates was an engineer at the power plant in Murray. He was also serving as a member of the Granite Stake's high council and had been on a missionary committee. With this assignment, he worked with Merrill to develop the curriculum, which was based on the Old Testament, New Testament, Book of Mormon, and church history. They worked with schools and administrators so that students would be able to leave campus during their free study block. Yates also helped oversee construction of the building used for seminary, which was finished in 1912.

The seminary opened in fall 1912 with 70 students enrolled. Yates continued working at the Murray power plant and would ride his horse to make it to the last two class periods of the day to teach. He was paid a $100 salary for his contributions. Students studied religious texts and were expected to take notes. While Yates was offered the job the following year, he declined the position due to his heavy work schedule. He only served as the seminary instructor for one year, after which he was succeeded by Guy C. Wilson.

=== Other contributions ===
Yates also worked with the Granite Stake Genealogical Organization, which was organized in 1916. He was appointed the head of the organization and held that position until 1928. He was also at various times a volunteer religios teacher in other local organizations of the church.

== Later life ==
Yates continued to serve in other responsibilities and assignments in the church. He wrote a book called A Brief History of the Origin of the Nations. He worked as a tour guide at Temple Square and served as a temple worker for ten years. He died on February 8, 1958, in Abilene, Texas, while he was visiting. He died in the Rancho Motel. Investigators found that he died due to a pulmonary hemorrhage.
