= Thuesen =

Thuesen is a surname. Notable people with the surname include:

- Marius Thuesen (1878–1941), Danish gymnast
- Peter J. Thuesen (born 1971), American religious scholar
- Peter Thuesen (sport shooter) (born 1978), Danish sport shooter
- Karen Thuesen Massaro (born 1944), Danish ceramist

== See also ==
- Thuesen-Petersen House, is a historic pair-house in Scipio, Utah
