= Granite High School (Utah) =

Public school in Utah, United States

- Granite High School c. 1911

Location
- 3305 South 500 East; South Salt Lake, Utah; United States; 40°41′55″N 111°52′35″W

Information
- Type: Public
- Established: 1906
- Status: Closed
- Closed: 5 June 2009
- School district: Granite School District
- Mascot: Farmer (aka "Mighty Fighting Agrarians")

Granite High School was a public high school located at 3305 South 500 East in South Salt Lake, Utah.

== History ==
Granite opened in 1906. In 2005–2006, the enrollment was 1250, but was reduced as the school transformed into an "academy" format. The academies within the school include the Young Parent program for teenage parents with children and the ESL program for new immigrants and refugees.

The decision to change from a traditional high school caused some controversy in the local community because it coincided with the removal of all the school's sports programs, many of which had been played for nearly a century. The removal of sports led to increased transfers to outlying schools among the student body at that time.

Granite High belonged to the Granite School District. The mascot was the Farmer. Popular AP U.S. History teacher, Dale Wood, often referred to the mascot as the "Fighting Agrarians."

At the end of the 2009 school year, the school was closed. The final commencement ceremonies were held on June 5, 2009.

After multiple attempts to preserve the building fell through, it was later purchased for $11.6 million by Wasatch Developments and Garbett Homes for residential development, with plans featuring a mix of 76 single-family homes and commercial property fronting 3300 South in which the property were finalized in late 2016. In April 2017, the district began demolishing the abandoned school in preparation for a development complex. However, former alumni can also purchase former pieces of their old school, such as bricks or windows.

== Notable people ==
=== Alumni ===
- Ed Catmull, Class of 1963, President of Pixar
- Frank Christensen, Class of 1928, football player, Detroit Lions
- James E. Faust, Class of 1937, former Second Counselor in the First Presidency of the Church of Jesus Christ of Latter-day Saints
- Eldon Fortie, Class of 1960, Canadian football player, Edmonton Eskimos
- Leigh Harline, Class of 1925, Academy Award winner for the song When You Wish upon a Star
- Gordon Jolley, Class of 1967, football player, Detroit Lions, Seattle Seahawks
- Neal A. Maxwell, Class of 1944, former apostle of the Church of Jesus Christ of Latter-day Saints
- Frank Moss, Class of 1929, US Senator
- Rick Parros, Class of 1976, football player, Denver Broncos
- Jack Reddish, Class of 1944, Olympic alpine ski racer and film producer
- Golden Richards, Class of 1969, football player, Dallas Cowboys
- Cecil O. Samuelson, Class of 1959, physician, LDS General Authority, and president of Brigham Young University.
- Glen Smith, Class of 1948, All-American basketball player at the University of Utah.
- David Kent Winder, Class of 1949, US federal judge
- LeRoy S. Wirthlin, Class of 1950, Harvard professor and physician

=== Faculty ===
- Adam S. Bennion, principal
- LaVell Edwards, football coach
- Joseph F. Merrill, founder of the seminary
- Wilson W. Sorensen, industrial arts teacher
- Thomas J. Yates, first seminary teacher

== See also ==
- List of high schools in Utah
