= Dominic W. Massaro =

American computer engineer

Dominic W. Massaro is professor of Psychology and Computer Engineering at the University of California, Santa Cruz. He is best known for his fuzzy logical model of perception, and more recently, for his development of the computer-animated talking head Baldi. Massaro is director of the Perceptual Science Laboratory, past president of the Society for Computers in Psychology, book review editor for the American Journal of Psychology, founding Chair of UCSC's Digital Arts and New Media program, and was founding co-editor of the interdisciplinary journal Interpreting. He has been a Guggenheim Fellow, a University of Wisconsin Romnes Fellow, a James McKeen Cattell Fellow, an NIMH Fellow, and in 2006 was recognized as a Tech Museum Award Laureate.

Massaro received his B.A. in Psychology from the University of California, Los Angeles in 1965, and completed his Ph.D. in Mathematical Psychology at the University of Massachusetts Amherst in 1968. After his postdoctoral work at the University of California, San Diego, he was Professor of Psychology at the University of Wisconsin, Madison from 1970 to 1979, before moving to UCSC where he has remained since.

Massaro's research focuses on applying an information processing approach to the study of language, perception, memory, cognition, and decision making. In collaboration with Gregg Oden, he developed the fuzzy logical model of perception, which stresses the integration of multiple sources of information when modeling perception. This model has been shown to be mathematically equivalent to Bayes' theorem. Massaro's approach conflicts with the motor theory of speech perception and Massaro has been a critic.

Stemming from this early work, Massaro established a research program demonstrating the importance of information from the face in speech perception. As part of this program, Massaro, along with researcher Michael Cohen, developed the computer-animated talking head known as Baldi. The Baldi technology is special in its extraordinary accuracy, and has been expanded to speak in numerous languages. In recent years, Massaro has become more involved with applied research, using his talking head technology to benefit language learners, including those facing learning challenges such as deafness and autism. For this work, he was named a 2006 Tech Microsoft Education Award Laureate by the Tech Museum of Innovation.

One focus of his current research is on the development and theoretical and applied use of a completely synthetic and animated head (iBaldi) for speech synthesis, language tutoring, and edutainment. Massaro founded Psyentific Mind, Inc with the goal of using Behavioral Science and Technology to extend the range of the human mind. The company currently has 8 iPhone/iPad apps in the Apple app store. These include apps for enhancing literacy, phonics, tile matching games for learning vocabulary and phonics, automated speech recognition in face to face communication, and learning to tell time with Kid Klok, an easy-to-read analog clock for children.

Massaro is husband to ceramicist Karen Thuesen Massaro and father to Pia T. Massaro and Andrew T. Massaro

== Honors and awards ==
- Laureate, Tech Microsoft Education Award, Tech Museum of Innovation in San Jose, 2006
- Fellow, Association for Psychological Science, elected 1997
- Fellow, Society of Experimental Psychologists, elected 1990
- Recipient, James McKeen Cattell Sabbatical Fellowship, 1988–1989
- President, Society for Computers in Psychology, 1985
- Fellow, American Psychological Association, elected 1980
- Romnes Fellowship, University of Wisconsin, 1977
- NIMH Special Research Fellowship Award, 1975–1976
- Recipient, John Simon Guggenheim Fellowship, 1975–1976
- NIMH Postdoctoral Fellowship, 1968–1970

== Selected bibliography ==
- Symbiotic Value of an Embodied Agent in Language Learning. In Sprague, R.H., Jr. (Ed.), IEEE Proceedings of 37th Annual Hawaii International Conference on System Sciences (CD-ROM), Computer Society Press, 10 pages, 2004. Best paper in Emerging Technologies.
- Massaro, DW. and Light, J. Using visible speech for training perception and production of speech for hard of hearing individuals. Journal of Speech, Language, and Hearing Research, 2004, 47(2), 304–320.
- From Multisensory Integration to Talking Heads and Language Learning. In G. Calvert, C. Spence and B.E. Stein (Eds.), Handbook of Multisensory Processes, 2004, (pp. 153–176). Massachusetts: MIT Press.
- de la Vaux, S.K. and Massaro, DW. Audiovisual Speech Gating: Examining Information and Information Processing. Cognitive Processing (Special Issue devoted to Multisensory Processing), 2004, (2), 106–112.
- Massaro, DW., Cohen, M.M., Campbell, C.S. and Rodriguez, T. Bayes Factor of Model Selection Validates FLMP. Psychonomic Bulletin and Review, 2001, 8, 1-17.
- Perceiving Talking Faces: From Speech Perception to a Behavioral Principle. Cambridge, MA: MIT Press, 1998.
- Massaro, D.W., and Stork, D.G. Speech recognition and sensory integration, American Scientist, 1998, 86, 236–244.
- Dominic W. Massaro (September 1991). "Psychology as a Cognitive Science" (PDF). Psychological Science. 2 (5): 302–307. doi:10.1111/j.1467-9280.1991.tb00156.x. S2CID 145605337. Archived from the original (PDF) on 2011-07-20.
- Dominic W. Massaro (Autumn 1990). "Book review of Remembering Reconsidered by Neisser & Winograd". American Journal of Psychology. 103 (3): 403–431. JSTOR 1423218.
