= S. A. Kenner =

American politician (1852–1913)

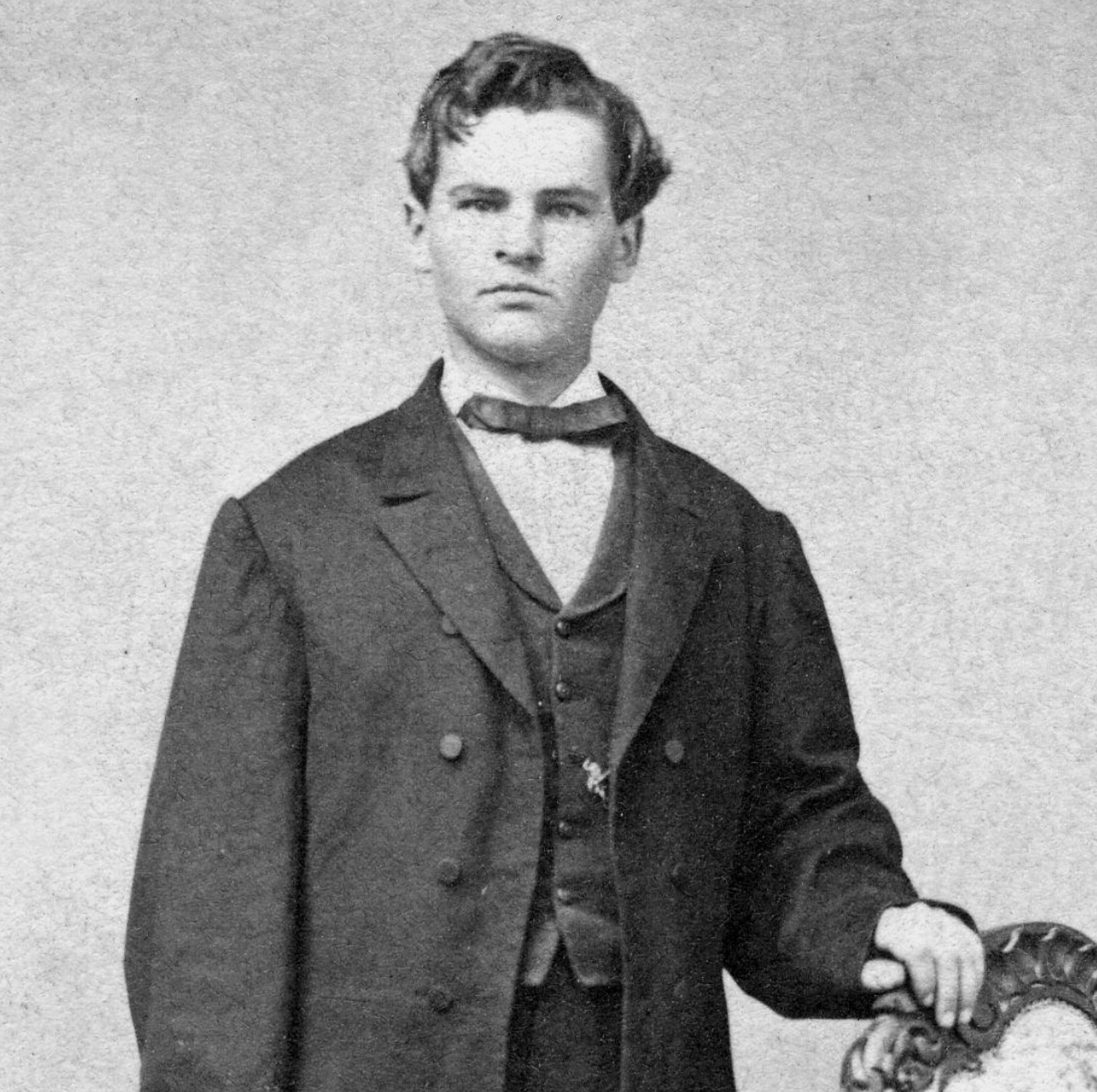
- Scipio Africanus Kenner posing for a photo.
- Born: May 14, 1846; Saint Francisville, Missouri
- Died: March 15, 1913 (aged 66); Salt Lake City, Utah
- Burial place: Salt Lake City Cemetery
- Occupations: Attorney; State Legislator
- Spouse: Isabella Gray Park
- Children: 12

Utah State Representative
- In office 1896–1897

Personal details
- Party: Democratic

Scipio Africanus Kenner, usually known as S. A. Kenner (1852–1913) was an editor and politician in territorial and early statehood Utah.

== Life ==
Kenner was born in Saint Francisville, Missouri and came to Utah with a Mormon pioneer company in 1860. He was baptized a member of The Church of Jesus Christ of Latter-day Saints in 1865. In 1871 Kenner married Isabella Park, whom he had become acquainted with while involved in dramatic productions in Salt Lake City. They eventually became the parents of twelve children.

Kenner worked as a telegraph operator and then as a journeyman at Deseret News. He eventually became an editor at the newspaper. At times he was the editor for both the Provo Times and the Ogden Standard.

Kenner was admitted to the bar after studying under George Sutherland. He worked as a city attorney, attorney for The Church of Jesus Christ of Latter-day Saints, assistant U.S. attorney, and served as a member of the Utah State Legislature. The books he authored include The Practical Politician and Utah As It Is.

== Death and legacy ==
Scipio fell seriously ill in late February 1913 as a result of stomach cancer. He was bedridden for two weeks before his death on March 15, 1913. He is buried at Salt Lake City Cemetery in Salt Lake City, Utah.

The town of Scipio, Utah was named in his honor.
