= Glen Smith (basketball) =

American basketball player (1928–2019)

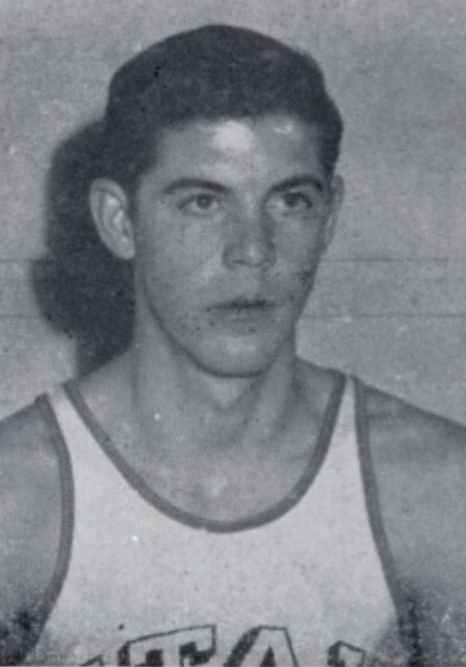
- Smith in his junior year at Utah.

Personal information
- Born: November 17, 1928 Murray, Utah, U.S.
- Died: September 29, 2019 (aged 90) Salt Lake City, Utah, U.S.
- Listed height: 6 ft 4 in (1.93 m)

Career information
- High school: Granite (South Salt Lake, Utah)
- College: Utah (1949–1952)
- NBA draft: 1952: — round, —
- Drafted by: Philadelphia Warriors
- Position: Center
- Number: 8

Career history
- 1952–?: Denver Central Bankers

Career highlights
- NIBL Most Valuable Player (1953); AAU All-American (1954); First-team All-American – Look (1952); Second-team All-American – Collier's (1952)
- Stats at Basketball Reference

Glen Stanley Smith (November 17, 1928 – September 29, 2019) was an American basketball player, known for his All-American college career at the University of Utah in the 1950s.

Smith played at Granite High School in South Salt Lake, Utah, before matriculating at Utah to play for coach Vadal Peterson. An undersized center known for his ambidextrous play, Smith establishes himself as a top scorer in the Skyline Conference in his three varsity seasons. After averaging 18.9 points per game in his senior year, Smith was named a first-team All-American by the National Association of Basketball Coaches in Collier's magazine and a second-team All-American by Look magazine. Smith left Utah holding school and conference records for single season scoring, as well as the Skyline record for most points in a game.

Following the close of his college career, Smith played for the Denver Central Bankers team in the National Industrial Basketball League (NIBL) and Amateur Athletic Union (AAU). Smith was named the NIBL Most Valuable Player for the 1952–53 season and an AAU All-American the following year.

Smith died on September 29, 2019, in Salt Lake City at age 90.
