= Peter Quarnberg House =

- U.S. National Register of Historic Places
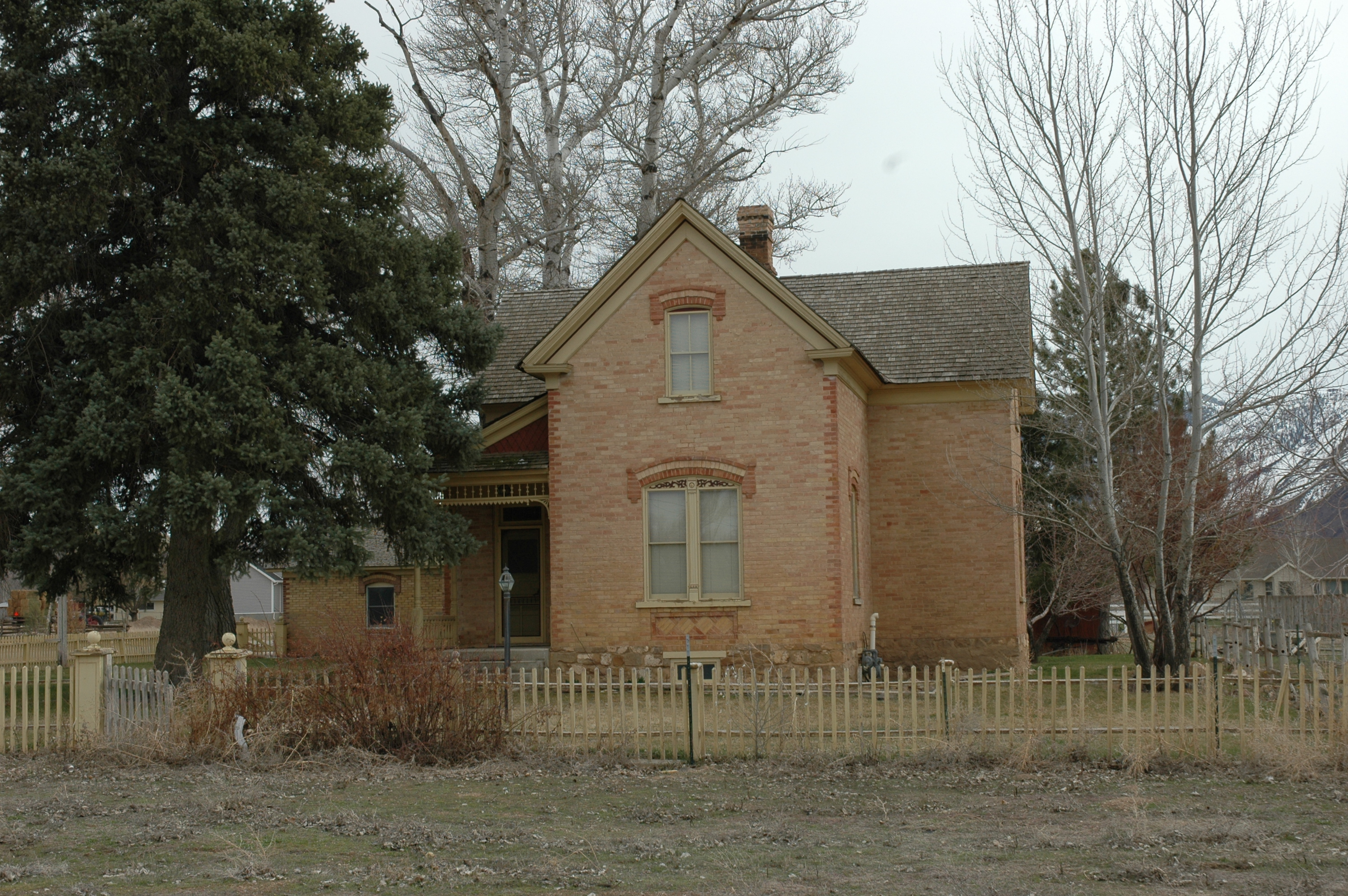
- The house in 2010

- Location within Utah Location within the United States
- Location: Off UT 63, Scipio, Utah
- Coordinates: 39°14′36″N 112°06′20″W
- Area: 1.5 acres (0.61 ha)
- Built: 1900
- Built by: Antone Peterson
- Brick mason: Will Critchley
- Architectural style: Queen Anne
- NRHP reference No.: 82004128
- Added to NRHP: July 26, 1982

The Peter Quarnberg House is a historic house in Scipio, Utah. It was built in 1900 by Antone Peterson, an immigrant from Sweden, for Peter J. Quarnberg, also an immigrant from Sweden who converted to the Church of Jesus Christ of Latter-day Saints with his parents before settling in Scipio in 1872. Quarnberg married Caroline Marie Hanseen, also an immigrant from Sweden, and they had five sons and two daughters. They resided in this house, designed in the Queen Anne architectural style. It later belonged to their son Archie, followed by his daughter Coleen Quarnberg Memmot. It has been listed on the National Register of Historic Places since July 26, 1982.

Quarnberg was born January 22, 1854, in "Wermlingbo" (perhaps Vamlingbo?), Gotland, Sweden. The Hanseens were also immigrants from Gotland.
