= Deseret Relief Society Hall =

- U.S. National Register of Historic Places
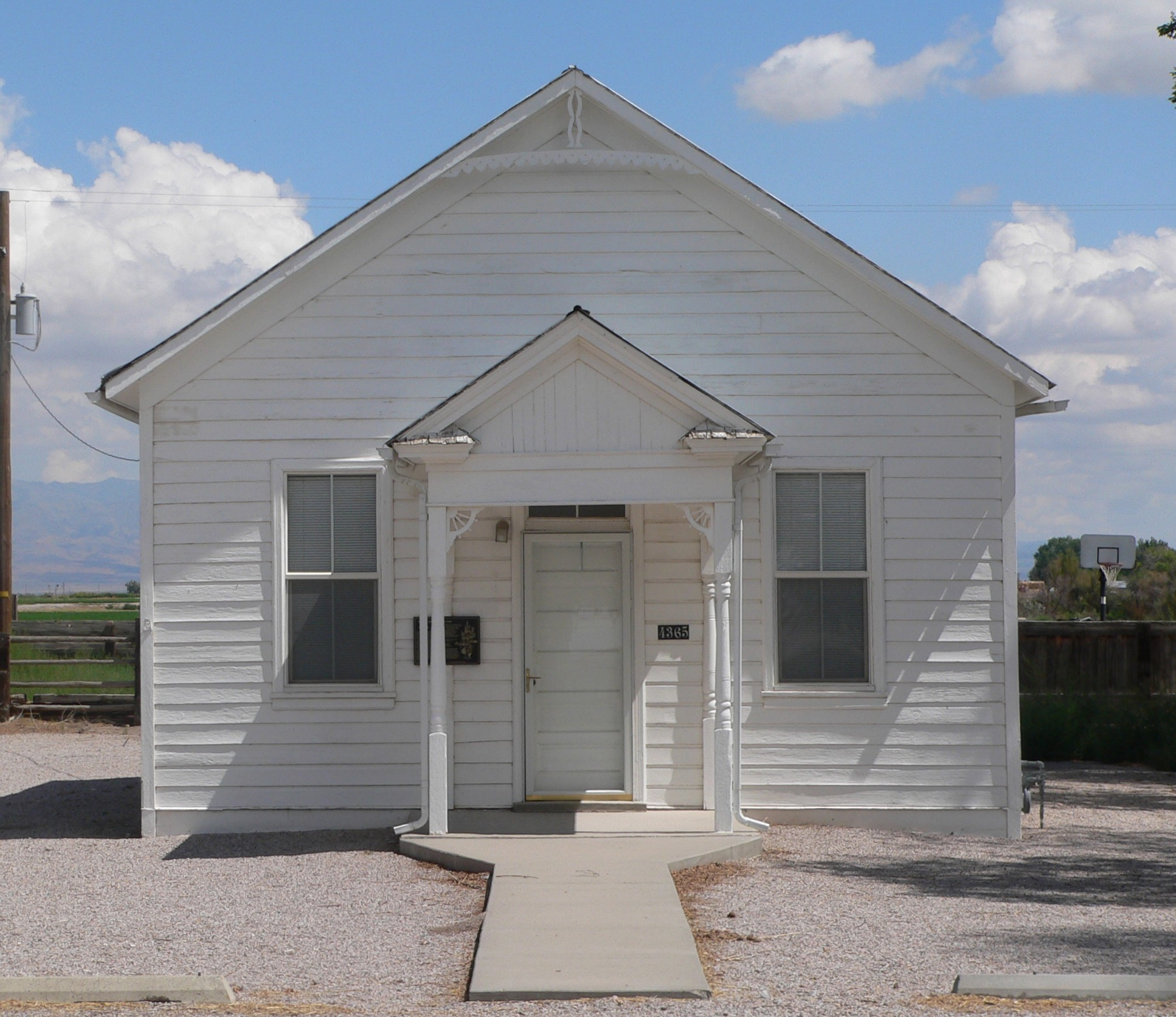

- Location within Utah Location within the United States
- Location: 4365 S. 4000 W., Deseret, Utah
- Coordinates: 39.289096°N 112.652380°W
- Area: less than one acre
- Built: 1906
- Architectural style: Late Victorian
- MPS: Mormon Church Buildings in Utah MPS
- NRHP reference No.: 95001431
- Added to NRHP: December 13, 1995

The Deseret Relief Society Hall, at 4365 S. 4000 W. in Deseret, Utah, was built in 1906. It was listed on the National Register of Historic Places in 1995. It was built for use by the relief society of the Deseret Ward of The Church of Jesus Christ of Latter-day Saints.

It is a modest 24 by 38 feet (7.3 m × 11.6 m) building with some Victorian Eclectic style. It has an entrance porch with Queen Anne detailing in its spindled brackets and lathe-turned columns. The porch in the west-facing gable end facade, and there are cornice returns in the gable conveying Classical style.

It served as a religious structure, as a school, as a meeting hall, and as a clinic.

It is located on Utah State Route 257, the main north–south road running through Deseret.
