= Kanosh Tithing Office =

- U.S. National Register of Historic Places
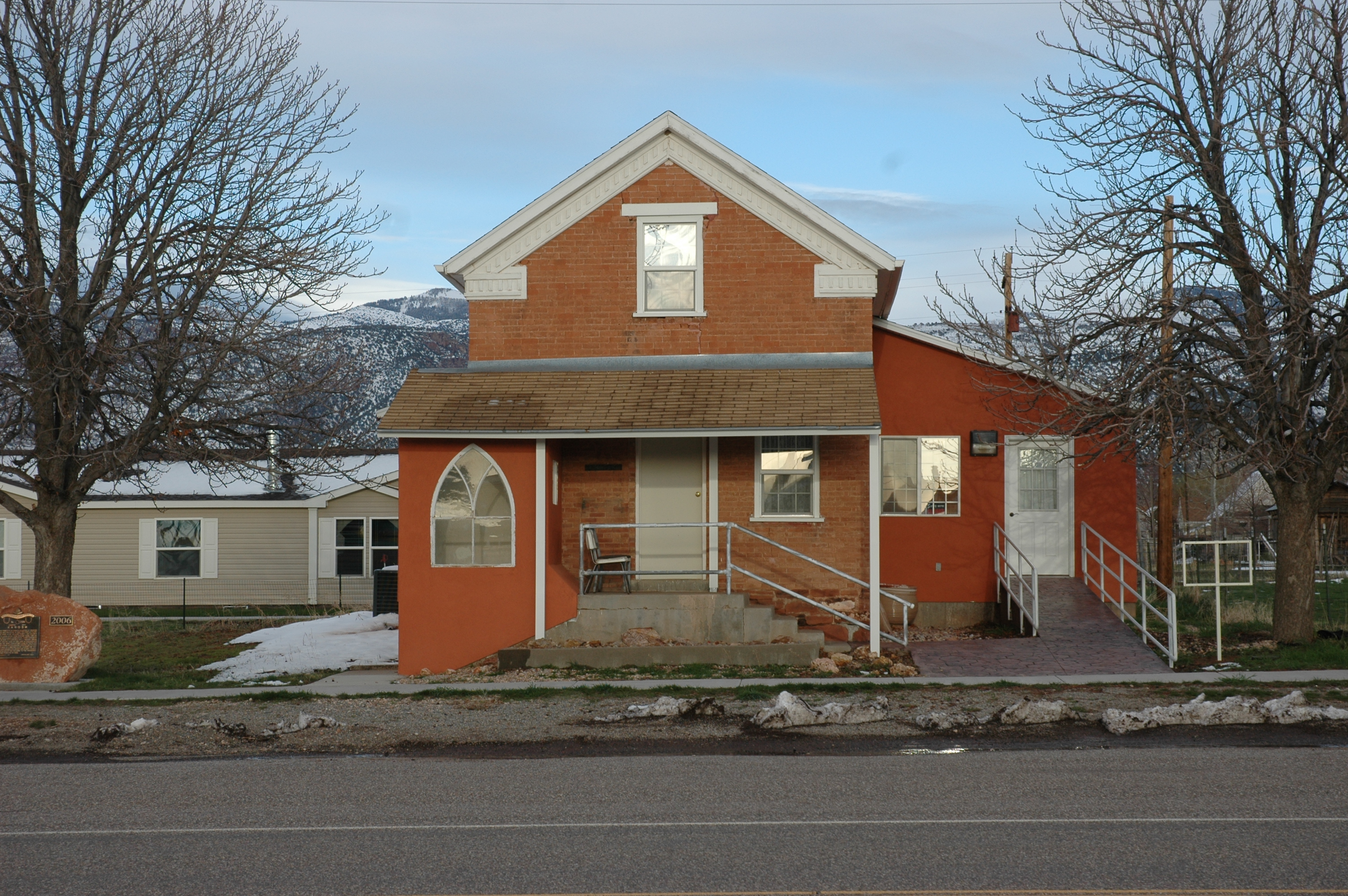
- The building in 2010

- Location within Utah Location within the United States
- Location: Off U.S. 91, Kanosh, Utah
- Coordinates: 38°48′08″N 112°26′11″W
- Area: less than one acre
- Built: 1870
- Architectural style: Greek Revival
- MPS: Tithing Offices and Granaries of the Mormon Church TR
- NRHP reference No.: 85000263
- Added to NRHP: January 25, 1985

The Kanosh Tithing Office is a historic building in Kanosh, Utah. It was built in 1870 in Kanosh, Utah as a tithing building for the Church of Jesus Christ of Latter-day Saints, and designed with elements of Greek Revival architectural style. It was acquired by the Daughters of Utah Pioneers in 1952. It has been listed on the National Register of Historic Places since January 25, 1985.
