= Gunnison Massacre Site =

- U.S. National Register of Historic Places
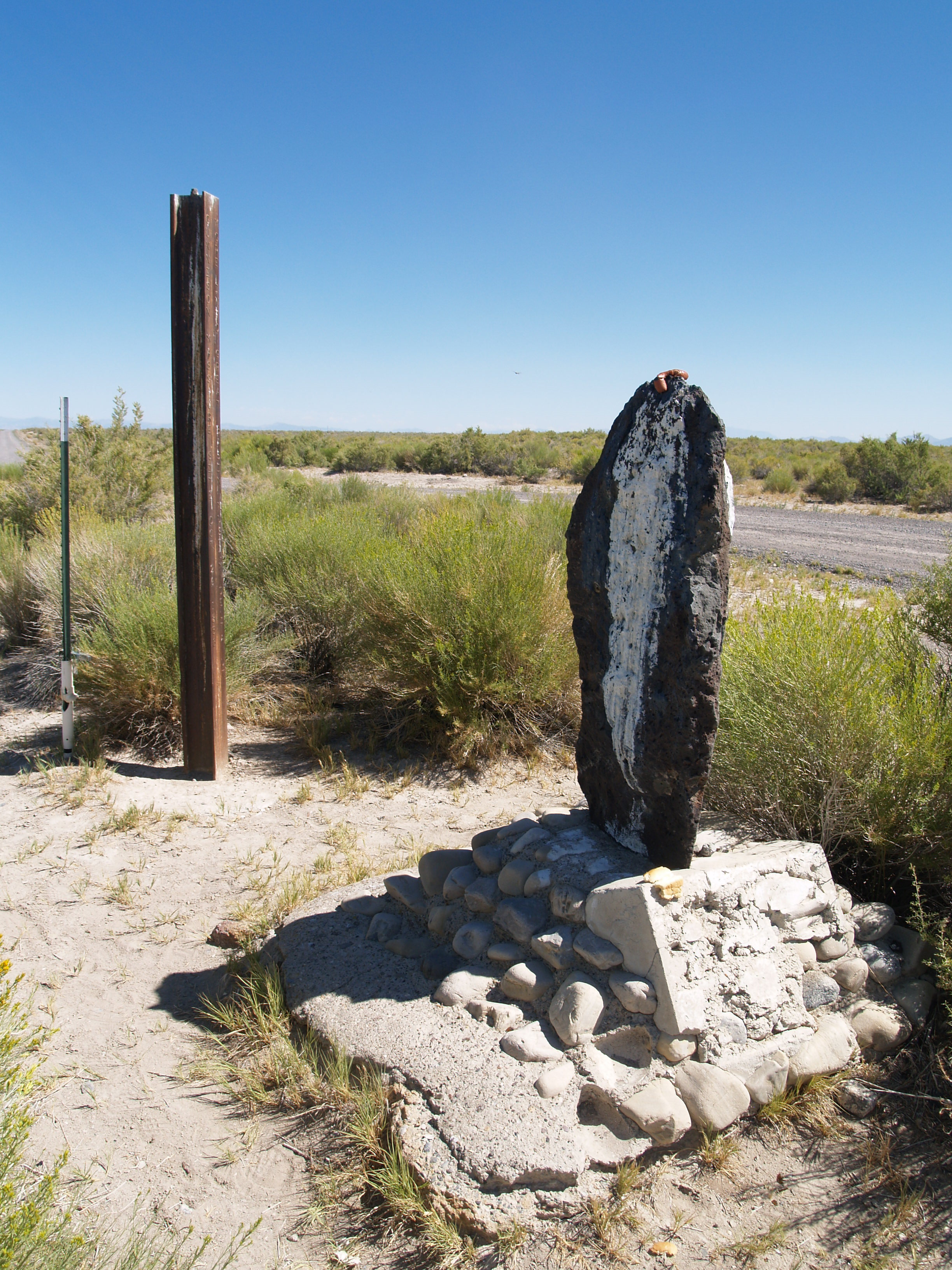

- Location within Utah Location within the United States
- Nearest city: Hinckley, Utah
- Coordinates: 39°16′46″N 112°46′40″W
- Area: 81 acres (33 ha)
- NRHP reference No.: 76001819
- Added to NRHP: April 30, 1976

Then Gunnison Massacre Site, in Millard County, Utah near Hinckley, Utah, was listed on the National Register of Historic Places in 1976.

It is the site of the 1853 "Gunnison massacre", in which John W. Gunnison and seven of his railroad survey party were killed, purportedly by Pah Vent Native Americans, possibly with contention between the Native Americans and Mormons over water being involved.

A stone monument with a bronze marker was placed at the site in 1927. The marker included a description of the event and names of the men killed. The bronze marker was stolen before the 1976 listing.

It is located about 6 miles (9.7 km) southwest of Hinckley on the Sevier River.
