= Edward and Elizabeth Partridge House =

- U.S. National Register of Historic Places
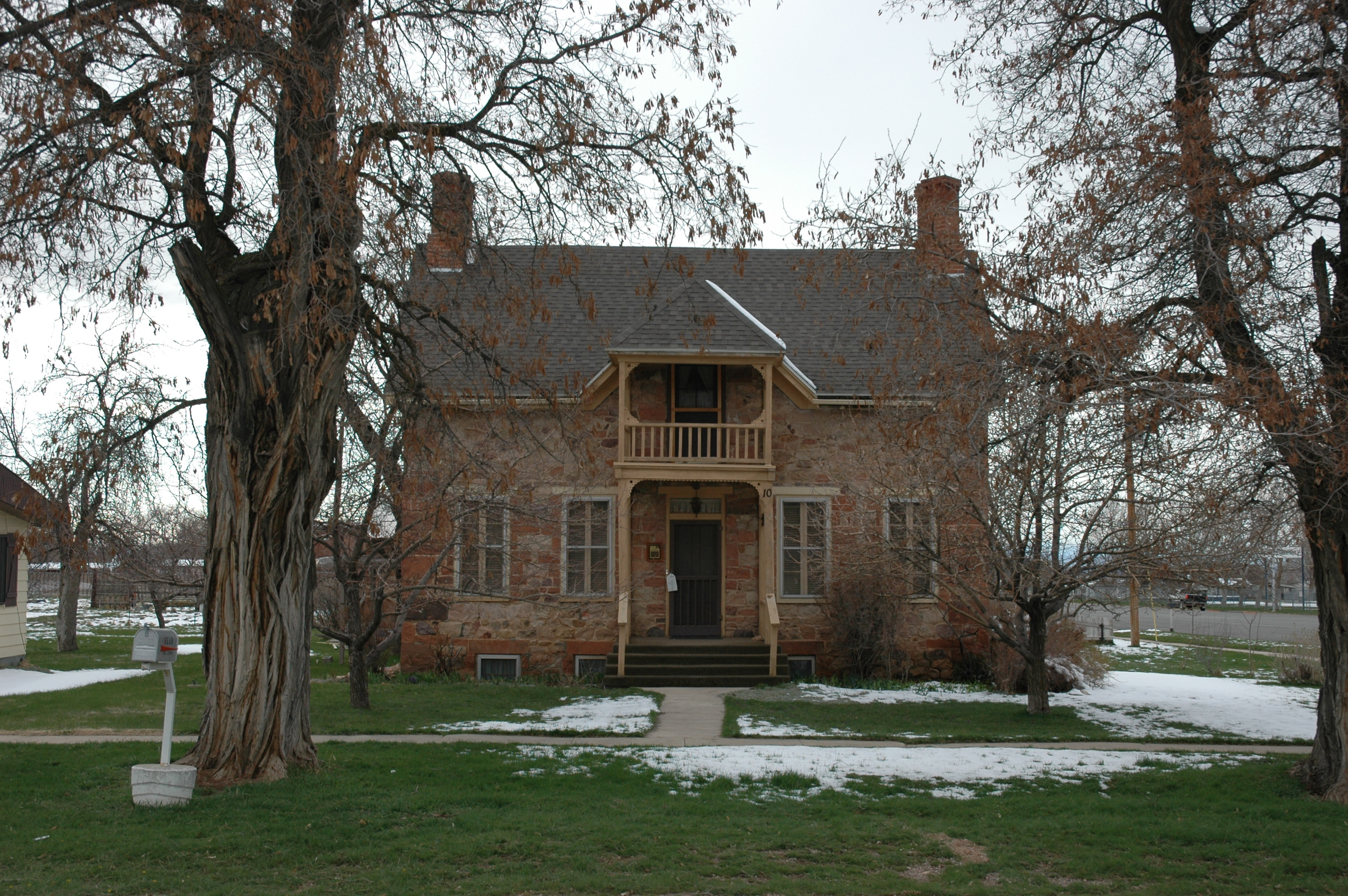
- The house in 2010

- Location within Utah Location within the United States
- Location: 10 South 200 West, Fillmore, Utah
- Coordinates: 38°58′07″N 112°19′44″W
- Area: 0.2 acres (0.081 ha)
- Built: 1871
- Built by: Lewis Tarbuck
- Architectural style: Gothic Revival, Vernacular
- NRHP reference No.: 93000414
- Added to NRHP: May 14, 1993

The Edward and Elizabeth Partridge House is a historic house in Fillmore, Utah, designed in the Gothic Revival style. It was built in 1871 by stonemason Lewis Tarbuck for Edward Partridge Jr., a farmer, merchant leader in the Church of Jesus Christ of Latter-day Saints, and politician who served as a member of the Utah Territorial Legislature in 1873 and as the mayor of Fillmore in the mid-1870s. Partridge was the bishop of the Fillmore ward of the Church of Jesus Christ of Latter-day Saints from 1864 to 1877; he was also a missionary to the Sandwich Islands in 1854, and again in 1882–1885. He had two wives, Sarah Lucretia Clayton and Elizabeth Buxton, and 17 children. His first wife and children resided in Provo while Partridge and his second wife lived in this house. It has been listed on the National Register of Historic Places since May 14, 1993.
