= Peter and Jessie Huntsman House =

- U.S. National Register of Historic Places
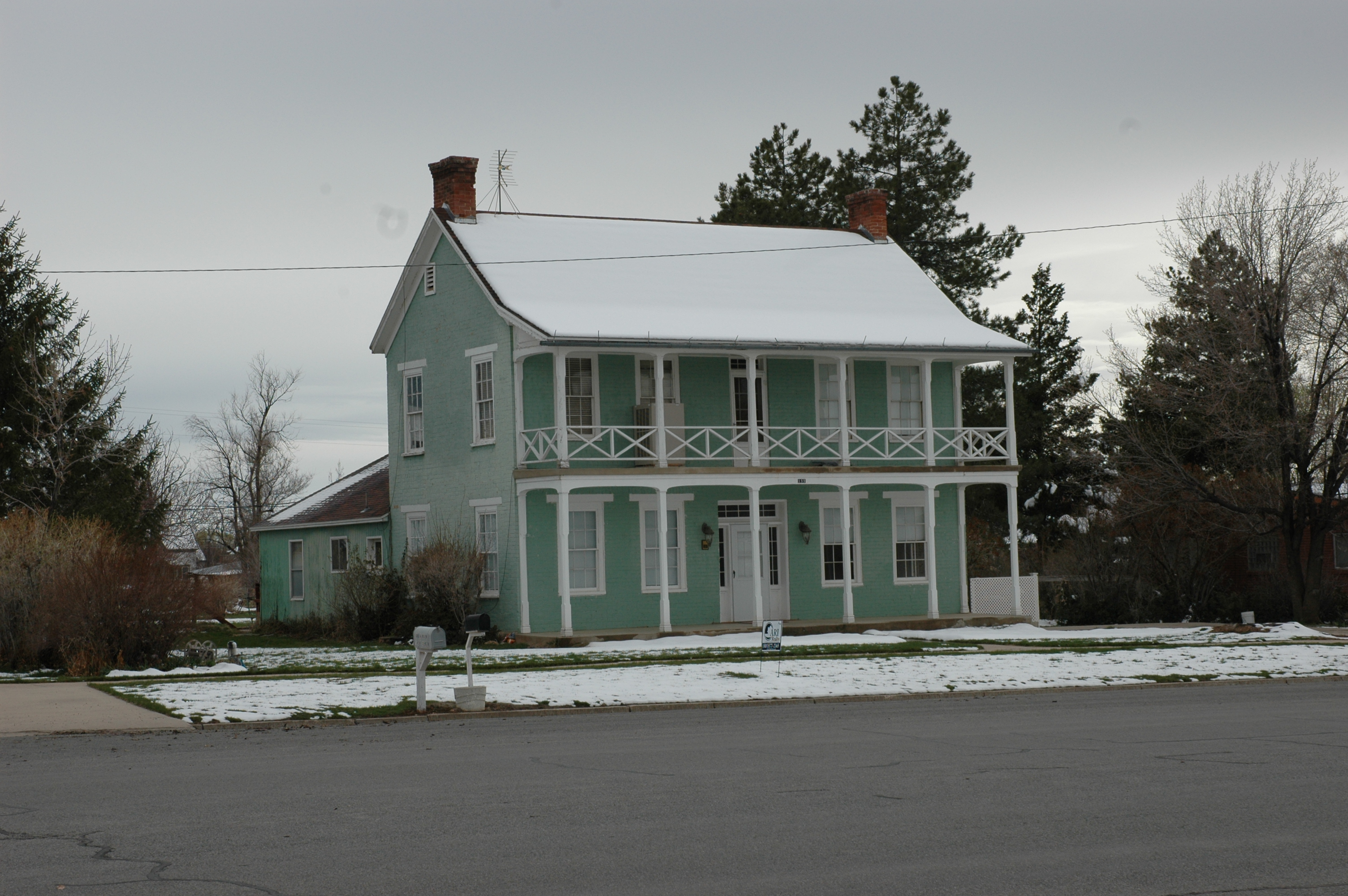

- Location within Utah
- Location: 155 W. Center, Fillmore, Utah
- Coordinates: 38°58′08″N 112°19′38″W
- Area: 0.5 acres (0.20 ha)
- Built: c.1871
- Built by: Hanson, Hans
- NRHP reference No.: 94001625
- Added to NRHP: January 30, 1995

The Peter and Jessie Huntsman House, at 155 W. Center in Fillmore, Utah, was built around 1871. It was listed on the National Register of Historic Places in 1995.

It was built by local builder/architect Hans Hanson, a graduate of the University of Odense, Denmark, who came to Fillmore in 1863 ("was sent by Brigham Young") and built more than 200 structures in the area, many similar to this one,

It is a painted brick two-story home with a central-passage plan and Classical stylistic features. It garnered a one-story addition to the rear c.1937. A root cellar behind the house was converted to a bomb shelter c.1958.

"The architectural style of the house is a vernacular interpretation of the Federal style with a central-passage form, popular in Utah between 1847-1900. The home's restrained Classicism makes it a good example of the Federal style with features that include the symmetrical facade, side gables, low-pitched roof, and lintel-type window heads. / The house is constructed of red brick (now painted green), three wythes thick in a common bond pattern, has a sandstone foundation, and floor joists resting on native, hand-hewn logs."
