= Fillmore City Cemetery =

Mormon cemetery in Fillmore, Millard County, Utah

- U.S. National Register of Historic Places
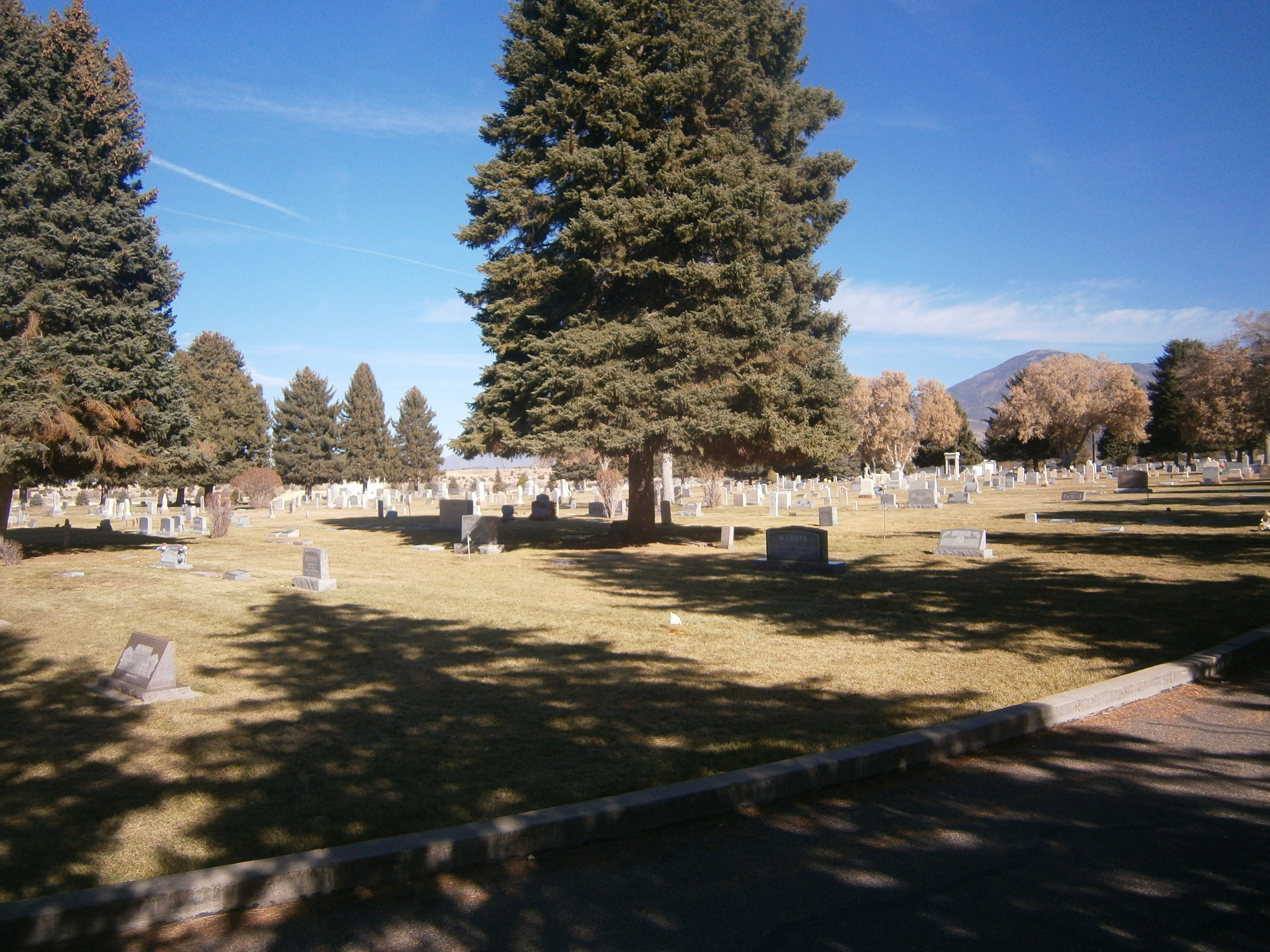

- Location within Utah Location within the United States
- Location: 325 East 600 South, Fillmore, Utah
- Coordinates: 38°57′16″N 112°18′44″W
- Area: 12.6 acres (5.1 ha)
- Built: 1852
- NRHP reference No.: 12000270
- Added to NRHP: May 9, 2012

The Fillmore City Cemetery, at 325 East 600 South in Fillmore, Utah, was started in 1852. It was listed on the National Register of Historic Places in 2012.

It is a cemetery similar to that of 35 other Mormon villages compared in a study.

It was established when the Territorial Statehouse was under construction and the Utah Territorial Legislature was meeting in Fillmore.

== Notable graves ==
- John Gunnison (1812–1853), leader of the ill-fated Gunnison–Beckwith expedition
- Amasa Mason Lyman (1813–1877), early Latter Day Saint movement church leader
- Proctor Robison (cenotaph), whose death at age 14 in 1857 was construed a cause for the Mountain Meadows Massacre
