= Scipio Town Hall =

- U.S. National Register of Historic Places
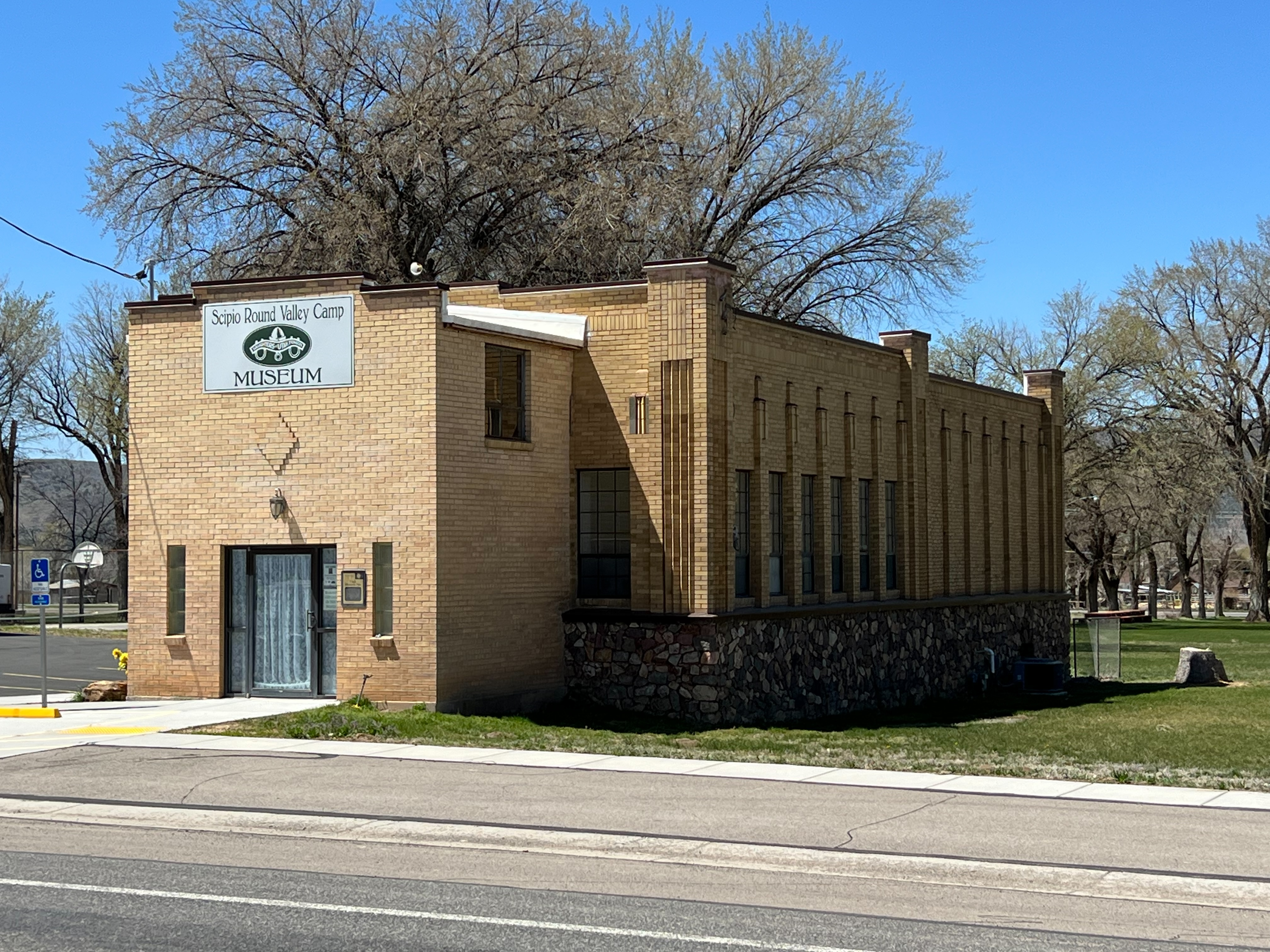
- Building in 2023

- Location within Utah Location within the United States
- Location: UT 63, Scipio, Utah
- Coordinates: 39°14′45″N 112°06′12″W
- Area: less than one acre
- Built: 1935
- Stonemasons: Will Critchley, Lew Critchley
- Architectural style: Moderne
- NRHP reference No.: 88002999
- Added to NRHP: December 22, 1988

The Scipio Town Hall, on North State Street in Scipio, Utah, is a PWA Moderne-style city hall building built in 1935 as a New Deal public works project. It was listed on the National Register of Historic Places in 1988.

Two brick and stonemasons who worked on the project were Will Critchley and Lew Critchley.

It was converted to serve as a senior citizen center in 1985–86.
