= LeRoy S. Wirthlin =

American surgeon (1935–2024)

LeRoy S. Wirthlin (April 11, 1935 – September 12, 2024) was an American professor at Harvard Medical School and later a practicing surgeon.

== Biography ==
Wirthlin received his bachelor's degree from the University of Utah and his medical degree from Harvard Medical School.

Wirthlin is a Latter-day Saint. From 2002 to 2005 he served as president of the Germany Munich Austria Mission of the Church of Jesus Christ of Latter-day Saints.

Wirthlin and his wife Mary are the parents of 17 children.

Wirthlin died on September 12, 2024, at the age of 90.

== Writings ==
Wirthlin has published papers on high altitude effects and also on the surgeries performed on Joseph Smith, Jr. This included an article about Nathan Smith published in the journal BYU Studies in 1977, followed by an article for more general readers in the Ensign magazine. Wirthlin got involved in the study of Smith's surgery due to interactions with his stake president Richard L. Bushman, who was an expert on Smith's life.

== Sources ==
- Scientific Commons entry
- Archives of Surgery article co-authored by Wirthlin
- Wirthlin's BYU studies article
- Mormon Times, Jul 21, 2008
- Obituary
