= Thuesen-Petersen House =

- U.S. National Register of Historic Places
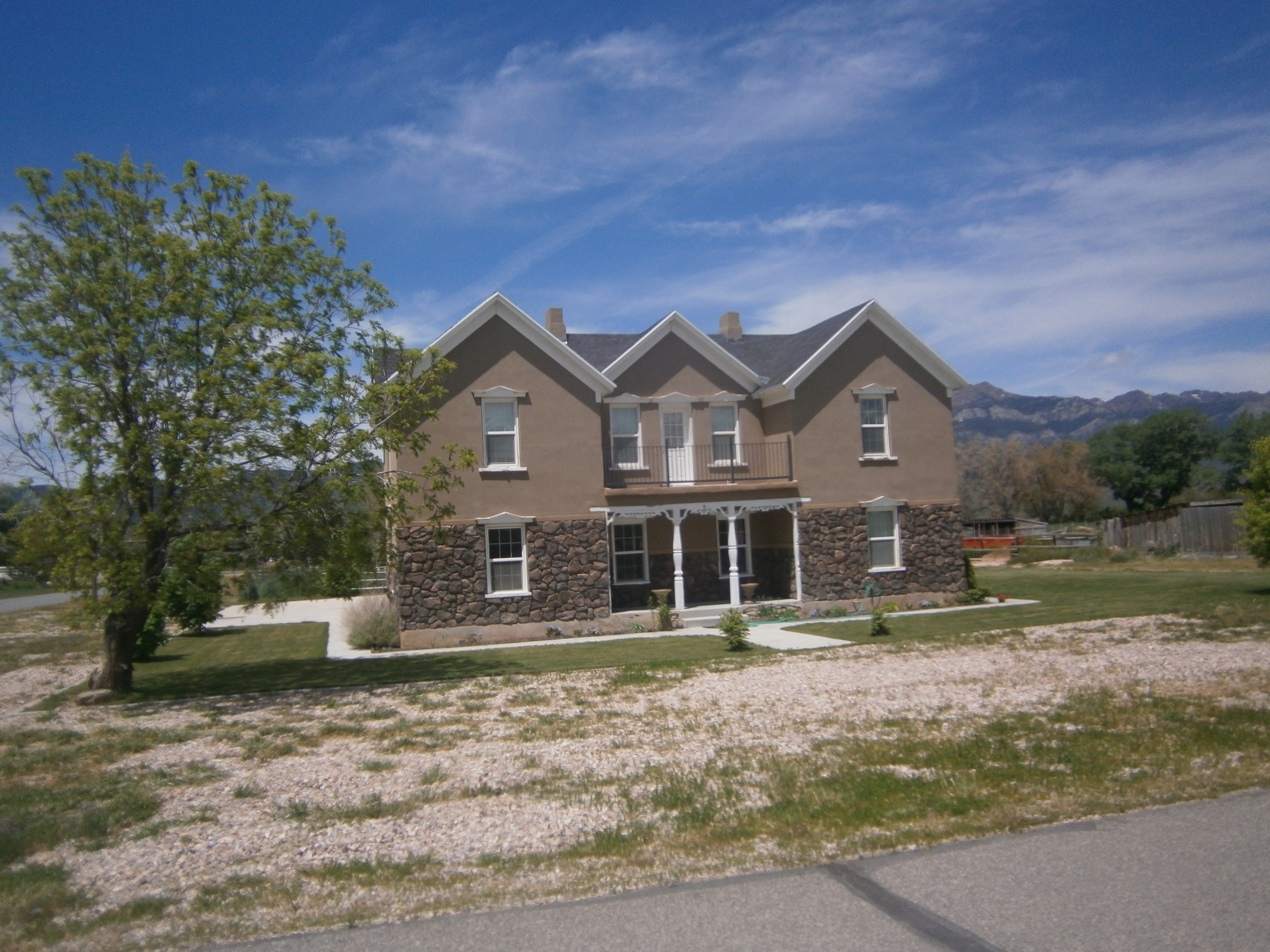
- Location: 260 W. Center St., Scipio, Utah
- Coordinates: 39°14′30″N 112°06′13″W
- Area: less than one acre
- Built: c.1870
- Built by: Thuesen, John
- Architectural style: Late Victorian, Greek Revival
- MPS: Scandinavian-American Pair-houses TR
- NRHP reference No.: 83004398
- Added to NRHP: February 1, 1983

The Thuesen-Petersen House, located at 260 W. Center St. in Scipio, Utah, is a historic pair-house which was built in c.1870. It was listed on the National Register of Historic Places in 1983.

It was deemed "significant as an example of Scandinavian vernacular architecture in Utah" in its historic site inventory form, which describes it:

This house is an example of the TYPE IV pair house, a type distinguished by the presence of an indented porch on the facade. The house is built of a locally fired, yellow brick with the walls laid in a common bond fashion. Originally the house was only a single story and had straight gable roof and stove chimneys paired internally on the ridge. The distinctive second story which stands today was added in 1887. Expanding the house here simply meant adding a second story gabled room to each of the existing three bays. The house mixes Greek Revival and Victorian stylistic impulses.

It was built by John Thuesen, who was born near Copenhagen, Denmark, in 1843. He and his family joined the LDS church in 1856, and he immigrated to Utah in 1866.

The house is also associated with Jens Petersen, who was born in Ramsin, Hvidbjerg, Denmark in 1860, and who immigrated to Utah in 1875 with his father Niels and brother Andreas. They were unusual because they were not LDS church members, but apparently were attracted to Utah based on reports from Danish Mormons who had come to Utah earlier. Jens bought this house in 1879, the three lived there, then in 1887 Jens added the second story and also built a store on the property. The store was detached and moved to Main Street in 1936.
