= Scipio, Utah =

Town in the state of Utah, United States

- Town
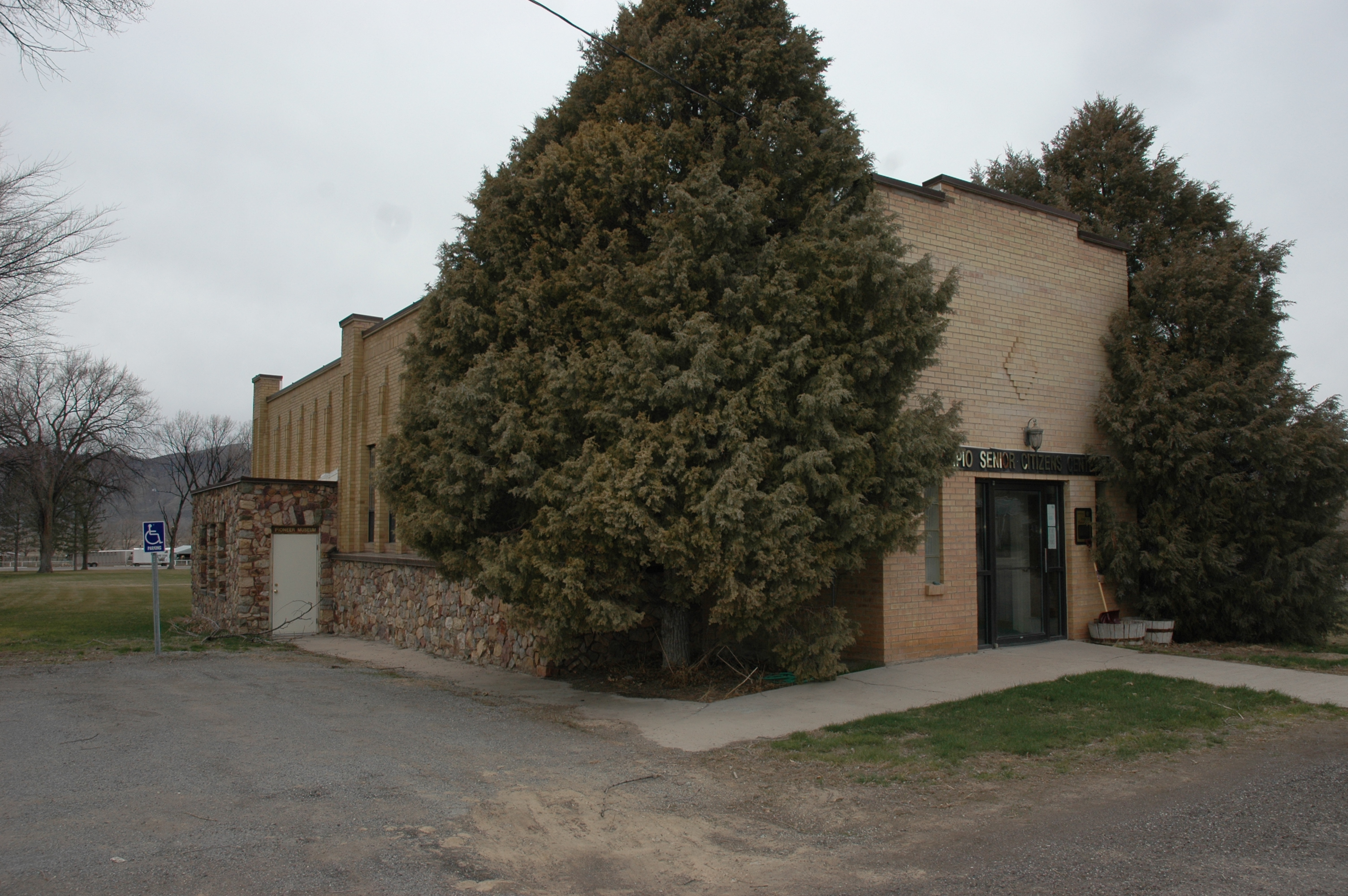
- The old Scipio town hall, April 2010

- Location in Millard County and the state of Utah.
- Coordinates: 39°15′05″N 112°06′16″W
- Country: United States
- State: Utah
- County: Millard
- Settled: 1859
- Named for: Scipio Kenner

Area
  - Total: 1.04 sq mi (2.70 km^{2})
  - Land: 1.04 sq mi (2.70 km^{2})
  - Water: 0 sq mi (0.00 km^{2})
- Elevation: 5,305 ft (1,617 m)

Population (2020)
  - Total: 353
  - Density: 318.9/sq mi (123.12/km^{2})
- Time zone: UTC-7 (Mountain (MST))
  - Summer (DST): UTC-6 (MDT)
- ZIP code: 84656
- Area code: 435
- FIPS code: 49-67880
- GNIS feature ID: 2413266
- Website: scipio.utah.gov

Scipio (locally /ˈsɪp.i.oʊ/ SIP-ee-oh) is a town on the eastern edge of Millard County, Utah, United States. The population was 353 at the 2020 census.

== Geography ==
According to the United States Census Bureau, the town has a total area of 5.5 square miles (14 km^{2}), all land. It lies in the oval-shaped Round Valley, 37 miles (60 km) south-southwest of Nephi, at the junction of Interstate 15 (I‑15) and U.S. Route 50 (US‑50). The nearest town, approximately 15 miles (24 km) southwest on I‑15, is Holden. About 30 miles (48 km) south-southeast are the towns of Redmond, Salina, and Aurora. About halfway between Scipio and Salina is Lake Scipio, on the west side of US‑50. To the east lie the Valley Mountains, with the highest peak reaching around 8,189 feet (2,496 m). To the south are the Pahvant Mountains, which rise above 10,000 feet (3,000 m).

=== Climate ===
According to the Köppen Climate Classification system, Scipio has a hot-summer humid continental climate, abbreviated "Dfa" on climate maps. The hottest temperature recorded in Scipio was 107 °F (41.7 °C) on July 18, 1998, while the coldest temperature recorded was −40 °F (−40.0 °C) on January 9, 1937 and January 22, 1937.

Climate data for Scipio, Utah, 1991–2020 normals, extremes 1895–present
Month	Jan	Feb	Mar	Apr	May	Jun	Jul	Aug	Sep	Oct	Nov	Dec	Year
Record high °F (°C)	69 (21)	70 (21)	85 (29)	89 (32)	96 (36)	102 (39)	107 (42)	103 (39)	101 (38)	89 (32)	77 (25)	69 (21)	107 (42)
Mean maximum °F (°C)	52.5 (11.4)	58.5 (14.7)	71.1 (21.7)	78.2 (25.7)	87.0 (30.6)	95.2 (35.1)	99.8 (37.7)	96.3 (35.7)	90.9 (32.7)	81.6 (27.6)	67.8 (19.9)	56.0 (13.3)	98.6 (37.0)
Mean daily maximum °F (°C)	38.0 (3.3)	43.4 (6.3)	54.1 (12.3)	60.6 (15.9)	71.5 (21.9)	83.5 (28.6)	91.2 (32.9)	88.4 (31.3)	79.5 (26.4)	65.0 (18.3)	50.4 (10.2)	38.4 (3.6)	63.7 (17.6)
Daily mean °F (°C)	27.0 (−2.8)	32.4 (0.2)	41.1 (5.1)	46.7 (8.2)	55.9 (13.3)	66.5 (19.2)	75.1 (23.9)	72.9 (22.7)	62.5 (16.9)	49.4 (9.7)	37.3 (2.9)	27.1 (−2.7)	49.5 (9.7)
Mean daily minimum °F (°C)	16.0 (−8.9)	21.3 (−5.9)	28.1 (−2.2)	32.7 (0.4)	40.3 (4.6)	49.6 (9.8)	59.0 (15.0)	57.4 (14.1)	45.6 (7.6)	33.8 (1.0)	24.1 (−4.4)	15.9 (−8.9)	35.3 (1.9)
Mean minimum °F (°C)	−8.6 (−22.6)	0.2 (−17.7)	10.7 (−11.8)	17.3 (−8.2)	24.6 (−4.1)	33.4 (0.8)	43.9 (6.6)	41.9 (5.5)	29.3 (−1.5)	17.4 (−8.1)	2.6 (−16.3)	−9.0 (−22.8)	−13.0 (−25.0)
Record low °F (°C)	−40 (−40)	−38 (−39)	−17 (−27)	−2 (−19)	13 (−11)	20 (−7)	28 (−2)	26 (−3)	8 (−13)	0 (−18)	−24 (−31)	−36 (−38)	−40 (−40)
Average precipitation inches (mm)	1.35 (34)	1.27 (32)	1.29 (33)	1.34 (34)	1.33 (34)	0.55 (14)	0.52 (13)	0.84 (21)	1.02 (26)	1.24 (31)	1.06 (27)	1.37 (35)	13.18 (334)
Average snowfall inches (cm)	6.4 (16)	4.8 (12)	3.9 (9.9)	1.2 (3.0)	0.1 (0.25)	0.0 (0.0)	0.0 (0.0)	0.0 (0.0)	0.0 (0.0)	0.3 (0.76)	3.5 (8.9)	9.4 (24)	29.6 (74.81)
Average precipitation days (≥ 0.01 in)	6.6	6.9	7.2	7.5	6.9	3.1	4.0	5.1	4.2	5.7	5.7	6.4	69.3
Average snowy days (≥ 0.1 in)	2.8	2.0	1.8	0.6	0.0	0.0	0.0	0.0	0.0	0.2	1.3	2.9	11.6
Source 1: NOAA
Source 2: National Weather Service

== Demographics ==
Historical population
Census	Pop.	Note	%±
1870	465		—
1880	574		23.4%
1890	567		−1.2%
1900	578		1.9%
1910	546		−5.5%
1920	543		−0.5%
1930	544		0.2%
1940	595		9.4%
1950	491		−17.5%
1960	328		−33.2%
1970	264		−19.5%
1980	257		−2.7%
1990	291		13.2%
2000	290		−0.3%
2010	327		12.8%
2020	353		8.0%
U.S. Decennial Census

As of the census of 2000, there were 290 people, 112 households, and 91 families residing in the town. The population density was 340.8 people per square mile (131.7/km^{2}). There were 139 housing units at an average density of 163.4 per square mile (63.1/km^{2}). The racial makeup of the town was 97.59% White, 0.34% Native American, 0.69% from other races, and 1.38% from two or more races. Hispanic or Latino of any race were 3.79% of the population.

There were 112 households, out of which 28.6% had children under the age of 18 living with them, 72.3% were married couples living together, 6.3% had a female householder with no husband present, and 18.8% were non-families. 18.8% of all households were made up of individuals, and 13.4% had someone living alone who was 65 years of age or older. The average household size was 2.59 and the average family size was 2.95.

In the town, the population was spread out, with 24.8% under the age of 18, 8.6% from 18 to 24, 14.8% from 25 to 44, 24.5% from 45 to 64, and 27.2% who were 65 years of age or older. The median age was 46 years. For every 100 females, there were 105.7 males. For every 100 females age 18 and over, there were 105.7 males.

The median income for a household in the town was $30,227, and the median income for a family was $35,625. Males had a median income of $30,714 versus $13,750 for females. The per capita income for the town was $14,003. None of the families and 1.7% of the population were living below the poverty line, including no under eighteens and 1.3% of those over 64.

== History ==
Scipio was settled in 1859. Early names included Round Valley and Graball, but it was eventually named for Scipio Africanus Kenner, a young lawyer who helped the pioneers to obtain legal title to the land.

In 1861, George A. Smith organized a branch of The Church of Jesus Christ of Latter-day Saints in the town. A Fort Scipio also existed here at one time.

There are several pioneer-style homes in the town. Several houses are found on the National Register of Historic Places. They include the Peter Quarnberg House, the Merien and Rosabelle Robins House, the Thuesen-Petersen House and the Pharo Village (a Fremont site) south of Scipio. Also on the Historic Register is the Scipio Town Hall built in 1935 which includes a museum for the family, D.U.P. and a Senior Citizens Center. The Scipio Town Hall was intended for use as a town hall and as a meeting place for all civic and political functions in the community.

== See also ==
- List of cities and towns in Utah
