= Karen Thuesen Massaro =

Karen Thuesen Massaro (born 1944) is a ceramicist working in the United States known for creating unconventional arrangements of sculptural objects through her work. Interested in exploring abstraction, she has experimented with a variety of different themes including the repetition of forms and surface textural change, negative space, and the geometric patterning of natural objects. Massaro creates much of her artwork by taking casts of physical objects, like fruit, molding them out of clay, and decorating them with patterns. Her manipulations make common objects feel less ordinary. These experiments allow her to explore color and form in complex ways.

== Education and career ==
In 1966, Massaro graduated from the State University of New York (SUNY) at Buffalo with a BS in art education. The following year, she continued her graduate studies at the University of Massachusetts, Amherst. Initially she completed schooling for her teaching license and became an elementary school art teacher in Warwick, New York from 1966 to 1967. Massaro then went back to school and earned her Master of Fine Arts at the University of Wisconsin—Madison in 1972. While pursuing her MFA, Massaro began experimenting with clay. After receiving her master's degree, she began teaching ceramics to her elementary school students.

In the 1970s, she moved from elementary schools to colleges and universities, serving as a visiting assistant professor of art at Beloit College 1972-77 and a lecturer for the art department at the University of Wisconsin—Madison in 1976 and 1978. She was an artist-in-residence in the Arts/Industry program at the Kohler Company in Sheboygan, WI, in 1984. Eventually, she settled in Santa Cruz, CA, where she became a studio artist and a lecturer at the University of California, Santa Cruz. From 1996 to 1997, she was a guest curator at the Museum of Santa Cruz County, now part of the Santa Cruz Museum of Art. Throughout the 1990s, Massaro traveled as a speaker and workshop leader. She spoke at the Mendocino Arts Center in Mendocino, CA, Butter College in Orville, CA, University of Wisconsin—Madison in Madison, WI, University of Wisconsin—Eau Claire, in eau Claire, WI, and the University of Oregon—Eugene in Eugene, OR. Massaro also served on the National Council on Education for Ceramic Arts (NCECA) as a director-at-large in 1977 and as the chair of exhibition from 1978 to 1980. She is also a member of the American Crafts Council.

== Artist statement ==
When questioned about her work, Massaro has stated:

"My primary aim, is to explore rather than replicate. So much of one's time is spent in the studio, the process itself should be engaging. I try to imagine how colors and patterns might read. It is intriguing how complex juxtaposing characteristics of repeated lines, plus hue and value, can be working with multiple parts and views. Everything is subject to change until the last firing; after that, the piece is on its own."

== Awards ==
Massaro has earned significant recognition throughout her career. Her achievements include the National Endowment for Arts Grant in 1976 and the Wisconsin Arts Board Grant in 1977. In 1987, she received the Guild American Crafts Merit Award from Kraus Sikes, Inc. of New York. For "national and cultural enrichment of a community", Massaro was considered the Artist of The Year by the Santa Cruz County Arts Commission in 2003. She was also a recipient of the National Endowment for Arts Artist Fellowship award.

== Museum collections ==
The following is a selection of institutions that hold examples of Massaro's work.

- Chazen Museum of Art, Madison, WI
- Columbus Gallery of Fine Arts, Columbus, OH (now The Columbus Museum of Art)
- Decorative Arts Museum, Little Rock, AR
- Eli and Edythe Broad Art Museum, East Lansing, MI
- John Michael Kohler Arts Center, Sheboygan, WI
- Mingei International Museum, San Diego, CA
- Northern Arizona University, Flagstaff, AZ
- Plains Art Museum, Morehead, MN (now in Fargo, ND)
- Racine Art Museum, Racine, WI
- Santa Cruz Museum of Art and History, Santa Cruz, CA
- Topeka and Shawnee Country Public Library, Topeka, KS

== Selected solo exhibitions ==
Massaro's work has been exhibited in a variety of shows including, but not limited to:

- 2005: Real and Implied Space, exploding head gallery: contemporary art and ceramics, Sacramento, CA (now closed)
- 2003: 2003 Artist of The Year, Santa Cruz County Government Center, Santa Cruz, CA
- 2001: Pence Gallery, Davis, CA
- 1992: Karen Thuesen Massaro New Work, Winfield Gallery, Carmel, CA
- 1980: Synopsis Gallery, Winnetka, IL (renamed Vivid Art Gallery, Winetka, IL) (now closed)
- 1980: Rochester Art Center, Rochester, MN
- 1979: Recent Works in Clay, Gallery 8, La Jolla, CA (now closed)
- 1978: Sun Valley Venter for the Arts and Humanities, Sun Valley, ID (now Sun Valley Center for the Arts, Ketchum, ID)
- 1973: University of Wisconsin, Stevens Point, Stevens Point, WI

== Selected group exhibitions ==
Massaro's work has been featured in several exhibitions. The following is a short list of select group exhibitions:

- 2017: Duets: RAM Pairs Contemporary Craft Artists, Racine Art Museum, Racine, WI
- 2014: Arts/Industry: At and After the Factory, Artspace, John Michael Kohler Arts Center, Sheboygan, WI
- 2013: Stark Contrasts: Black and White Ceramics from RAM's Collection Racine Art Museum, Racine, WI
- 2012: a Feast of Beads, Facèré Jewelry Art Gallery, Seattle, WA
- 2011: Small Sculptures, Santa Fe Clay, Santa Fe, NM
- 2005: From Tiles to Totems: A Century of Northern California Ceramics, Art Foundry Gallery, Sacramento, CA
- 2004: Fabrication, Bruce Gallery of Art, Edinboro University of Pennsylvania, Edinboro, PA
- 2002: Summer Invitational, Sherry Leedy Contemporary Art, Kansas City, MO
- 2001: Perimeter Gallery, Chicago, IL (now closed)
- 2000: A Survey: Two Artists in Mid Career, Santa Cruz Museum of Art and History, Santa Cruz, CA
- 1997: Food Glorious Food: Artists and Eating, Racine Art Museum's Charles A. Wustum Museum of Fine Arts, Racine, WI
- 1993: Contemporary American Ceramics, Gallery Eight, La Jolla, CA (now closed)
- 1981: MTH Art Objects, San Antonio, TX
