= Hinckley, Utah =

Town in the state of Utah, United States

- Town
- Location in Millard County and the state of Utah.
- Coordinates: 39°20′01″N 112°40′25″W
- Country: United States
- State: Utah
- County: Millard
- Named for: Ira Hinckley

Area
  - Total: 4.99 sq mi (12.92 km^{2})
  - Land: 4.99 sq mi (12.92 km^{2})
  - Water: 0 sq mi (0.00 km^{2})
- Elevation: 4,597 ft (1,401 m)

Population (2020)
  - Total: 614
  - Density: 123/sq mi (47.5/km^{2})
- Time zone: UTC-7 (Mountain (MST))
  - Summer (DST): UTC-6 (MDT)
- ZIP code: 84635
- Area code: 435
- FIPS code: 49-35740
- GNIS feature ID: 2412754
- Website: hinckleytown.utah.gov

Hinckley is a town in Millard County, Utah, United States, in the middle of the Sevier Desert. Irrigation water from the Sevier River, passing nearby, has been used to turn Hinckley into a farming oasis. The mountains that are common in Utah are seen only in the distance, and beyond the reach of the river, a severe desert prevails. The population was 614 at the 2020 census.

== History ==
Hinckley was first settled by Erastus F. Pack, a son of John Pack. The area was part of the Latter Day Saints Deseret Ward until 1891 when that ward was split, and the area now known as Hinckley was made the Hinckley Ward, named after Ira N. Hinckley. Thomas George Theobald surveyed the town and divided it into 14 blocks of 5 acres each.

=== Airplane crash ===
On August 1, 1944, a B-24D Liberator Bomber on a training run crash landed west of Hinckley. The crew had bailed out near Eureka, NV.

== Geography ==
According to the United States Census Bureau, the town has a total area of 5.0 square miles (12.9 km^{2}), all land.

=== Climate ===
According to the Köppen Climate Classification system, Hinckley has a semi-arid climate, abbreviated "BSk" on climate maps.

Hinckley is in USDA Plant Hardiness Zone 6a

== Demographics ==
Historical population
Census	Pop.	Note	%±
1900	591		—
1910	324		−45.2%
1920	821		153.4%
1930	678		−17.4%
1940	637		−6.0%
1950	589		−7.5%
1960	397		−32.6%
1970	400		0.8%
1980	464		16.0%
1990	658		41.8%
2000	698		6.1%
2010	696		−0.3%
2020	614		−11.8%
U.S. Decennial Census

As of the census of 2000, there were 698 people, 218 households, and 180 families residing in the town. The population density was 138.8 people per square mile (53.6/km^{2}). There were 245 housing units at an average density of 48.7 per square mile (18.8/km^{2}). The racial makeup of the town was 97.71% White, 0.43% African American, 0.29% Native American, 0.14% Asian, 0.57% from other races, and 0.86% from two or more races. Hispanic or Latino of any race were 3.15% of the population.

There were 218 households, out of which 43.6% had children under 18 living with them, 72.5% were married couples living together, 6.9% had a female householder with no husband present, and 17.0% were non-families. 16.5% of all households were made up of individuals, and 9.2% had someone living alone who was 65 years of age or older. The average household size was 3.20, and the average family size was 3.61.

In the town, the population was spread out, with 38.0% under 18, 6.7% from 18 to 24, 24.6% from 25 to 44, 19.9% from 45 to 64, and 10.7% who were 65 years of age or older. The median age was 32 years. For every 100 females, there were 104.7 males. For every 100 females aged 18 and over, there were 102.3 males.

The median income for a household in the town was $35,625, and the median income for a family was $39,375. Males had a median income of $32,333 versus $25,000 for females. The per capita income for the town was $12,700. About 9.5% of families and 13.1% of the population were below the poverty line, including 18.9% of those under age 18 and 9.6% of those aged 65 or over.

== Notable people ==
- Arthur Gary Bishop, serial killer

== See also ==
- List of cities and towns in Utah
