= Deseret, Utah =

Deseret
- CDP
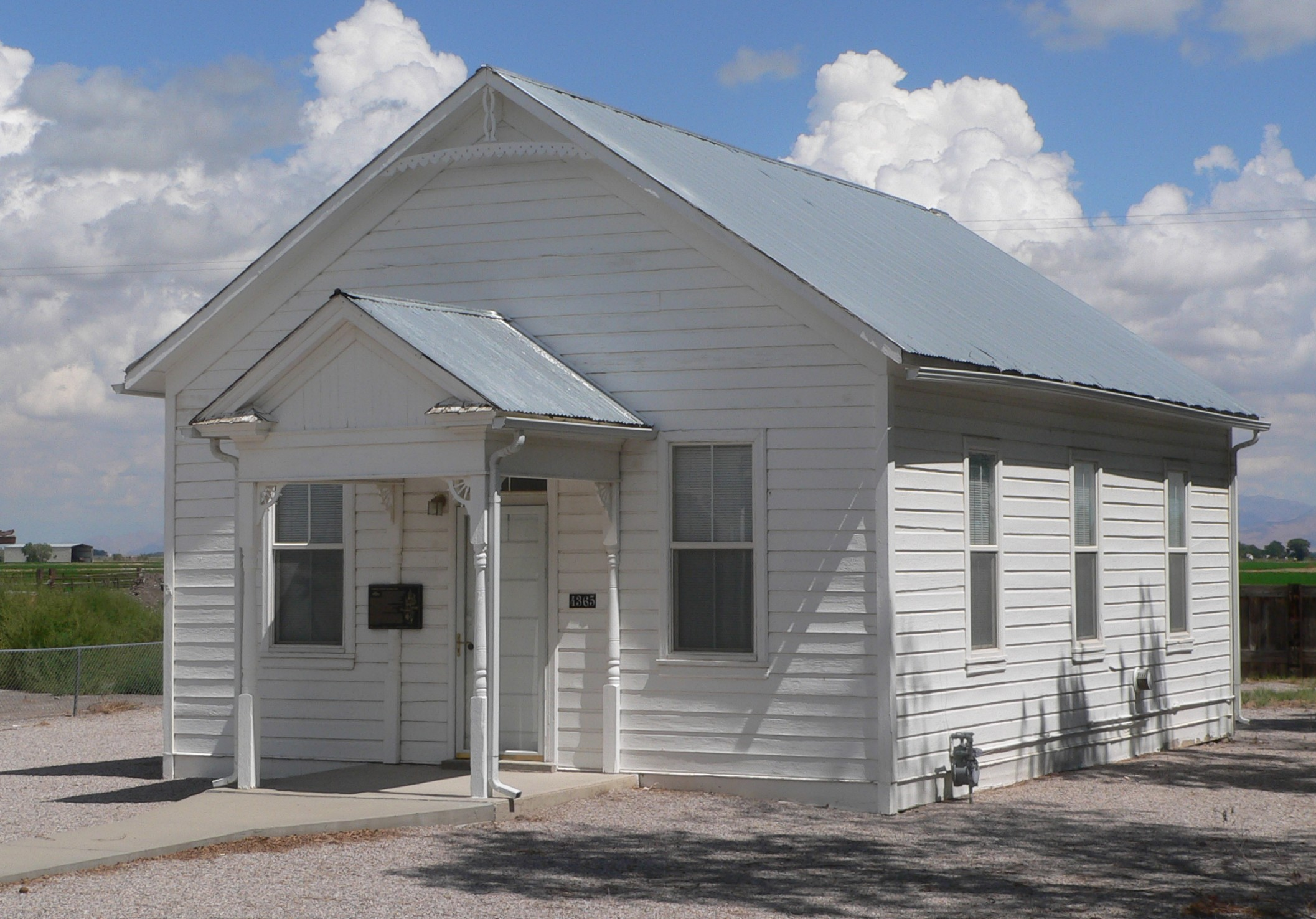
- Deseret Relief Society Hall, listed in the National Register of Historic Places

- Location in Millard County and the state of Utah.
- Coordinates: 39°17′15″N 112°39′04″W
- Country: United States
- State: Utah
- County: Millard
- Named after: Deseret
- Elevation: 4,590 ft (1,400 m)

Population (2020)
  - Total: 327
- Time zone: UTC-7 (Mountain (MST))
  - Summer (DST): UTC-6 (MDT)
- ZIP code: 84624
- Area code: 435
- GNIS feature ID: 2584761

Deseret (/ˌdɛzəˈrɛt/) is a census-designated place in Millard County, Utah, United States. The population was 327 at the 2020 census. Deseret is located approximately 10 miles (16 km) southwest of Delta, and about 150 miles (240 km) southwest of Salt Lake City. The name Deseret comes from the Book of Mormon.

== Climate ==
Deseret has a cold semi-arid climate (Köppen BSk) with hot summers and cold winters.

Climate data for Deseret, Utah, 1991–2020 normals, extremes 1893–present
Month	Jan	Feb	Mar	Apr	May	Jun	Jul	Aug	Sep	Oct	Nov	Dec	Year
Record high °F (°C)	64 (18)	74 (23)	90 (32)	91 (33)	103 (39)	108 (42)	111 (44)	107 (42)	107 (42)	93 (34)	79 (26)	69 (21)	111 (44)
Mean maximum °F (°C)	53.5 (11.9)	62.2 (16.8)	75.4 (24.1)	83.4 (28.6)	91.9 (33.3)	99.6 (37.6)	103.0 (39.4)	100.7 (38.2)	94.6 (34.8)	84.3 (29.1)	68.5 (20.3)	56.7 (13.7)	103.6 (39.8)
Mean daily maximum °F (°C)	38.8 (3.8)	46.4 (8.0)	59.0 (15.0)	66.2 (19.0)	76.0 (24.4)	87.4 (30.8)	94.9 (34.9)	92.7 (33.7)	82.4 (28.0)	67.5 (19.7)	51.4 (10.8)	39.0 (3.9)	66.8 (19.3)
Daily mean °F (°C)	27.6 (−2.4)	33.9 (1.1)	43.5 (6.4)	49.7 (9.8)	58.7 (14.8)	68.6 (20.3)	76.2 (24.6)	74.6 (23.7)	64.2 (17.9)	50.5 (10.3)	37.5 (3.1)	27.4 (−2.6)	51.0 (10.6)
Mean daily minimum °F (°C)	16.4 (−8.7)	21.4 (−5.9)	27.9 (−2.3)	33.2 (0.7)	41.4 (5.2)	49.8 (9.9)	57.5 (14.2)	56.5 (13.6)	45.9 (7.7)	33.6 (0.9)	23.5 (−4.7)	15.8 (−9.0)	35.2 (1.8)
Mean minimum °F (°C)	−2.8 (−19.3)	3.0 (−16.1)	14.1 (−9.9)	19.1 (−7.2)	26.9 (−2.8)	35.8 (2.1)	46.1 (7.8)	44.3 (6.8)	31.0 (−0.6)	18.6 (−7.4)	6.9 (−13.9)	−3.4 (−19.7)	−8.4 (−22.4)
Record low °F (°C)	−32 (−36)	−29 (−34)	−14 (−26)	6 (−14)	12 (−11)	22 (−6)	32 (0)	26 (−3)	19 (−7)	−3 (−19)	−11 (−24)	−32 (−36)	−32 (−36)
Average precipitation inches (mm)	0.69 (18)	0.66 (17)	0.84 (21)	0.96 (24)	0.95 (24)	0.47 (12)	0.41 (10)	0.53 (13)	0.68 (17)	0.90 (23)	0.55 (14)	0.62 (16)	8.26 (210)
Average snowfall inches (cm)	4.3 (11)	4.2 (11)	2.7 (6.9)	1.6 (4.1)	0.0 (0.0)	0.0 (0.0)	0.0 (0.0)	0.0 (0.0)	0.0 (0.0)	0.0 (0.0)	2.3 (5.8)	4.5 (11)	19.6 (50)
Average precipitation days (≥ 0.01 in)	4.8	5.4	5.1	6.1	6.1	2.8	3.1	3.4	3.8	4.7	3.6	4.1	53.0
Average snowy days (≥ 0.1 in)	2.2	2.0	1.5	0.8	0.1	0.0	0.0	0.0	0.0	0.0	0.9	2.2	8.6
Source: NOAA

== Demographics ==
Historical population
Census	Pop.	Note	%±
1870	150		—
1880	617		311.3%
1890	661		7.1%
1900	506		−23.4%
1910	414		−18.2%
1920	463		11.8%
1930	411		−11.2%
1940	350		−14.8%
1950	332		−5.1%
2010	353		—
2020	327		−7.4%
Source: U.S. Census Bureau

As of the census of 2010, there were 353 people living in the CDP. There were 124 housing units. The racial makeup of the town was 97.7% White, 1.4% American Indian and Alaska Native, 0.3% Native Hawaiian and Other Pacific Islander, and 0.6% from two or more races. Hispanic or Latino of any race were 2.3% of the population.

== See also ==
- List of census-designated places in Utah
