= Deer Trail Mountain =

Mountain in Utah, United States

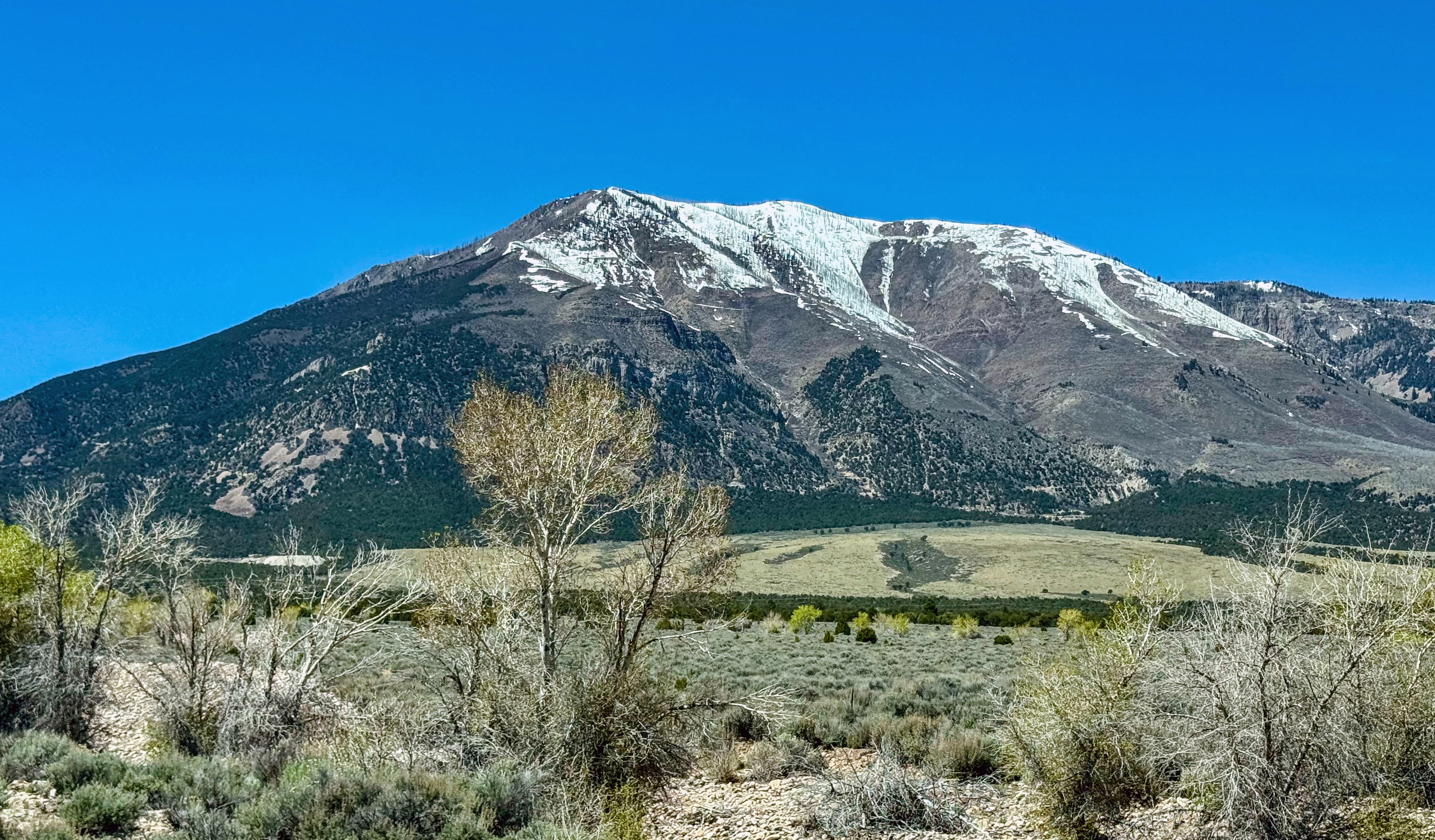
- East aspect

Highest point
- Elevation: 10,972 ft (3,344 m)
- Prominence: 232 ft (71 m)
- Parent peak: Mount Brigham
- Isolation: 2.0 mi (3.2 km)
- Coordinates: 38°22′56″N 112°17′57″W

Geography
- Location within Utah Location within the United States
- Country: United States
- State: Utah
- County: Piute
- Protected area: Fishlake National Forest
- Parent range: Tushar Mountains
- Topo map: USGS Mount Brigham

Deer Trail Mountain is a 10,972-foot-elevation (3,344-meter) mountain summit in Piute County, Utah, United States.

== Description ==
Deer Trail Mountain is located six miles (9.7 km) southwest of Marysvale, Utah, in the Tushar Mountains on land managed by Fishlake National Forest. Precipitation runoff from the mountain drains to the Sevier River via Gold, Threemile, Pine, and Cottonwood creeks. Topographic relief is significant as the summit rises 3,300 feet (1,006 meters) above Cottonwood Creek in 1.5 miles (2.4 km). The Deer Trail Mine on the mountain's east slope produced 77,500 ounces of gold from 1904 through 1959. The mine was discovered in 1878 when a piece of float ore was found on a deer's trail. This mountain's toponym has been officially adopted by the United States Board on Geographic Names. Based on the Köppen climate classification, Deer Trail Mountain has a dry summer subarctic climate (Köppen Dsc) with cold snowy winters and mild summers. The mountain has a complex rock composition consisting of Oligocene breccia and tuff at the top, which overlays Jurassic Navajo Sandstone, overlaying Triassic Chinle Formation, Triassic Moenkopi Formation, Permian Kaibab Limestone, Permian Toroweap Formation, and Queantoweap Sandstone.

== See also ==
- List of mountains in Utah
