= Erigeron nauseosus =

Scientific classification
- Kingdom: Plantae
- Clade: Tracheophytes
- Clade: Angiosperms
- Clade: Eudicots
- Clade: Asterids
- Order: Asterales
- Family: Asteraceae
- Genus: Erigeron
- Species: E. nauseosus

Binomial name
- Erigeron nauseosus (M.E.Jones) A.Nelson

Synonyms
- Erigeron caespitosus var. nauseosus M.E.Jones

Species of flowering plant

Erigeron nauseosus is a North American species of flowering plant in the family Asteraceae known by the common name Marysvale fleabane. It native to the western part of the United States, in northern Utah and Nevada.

Erigeron nauseosus is a small perennial herb rarely more than 4 centimeters (1.6 inches) tall, producing a taproot. The leaves and the stem are covered with stiff hairs. The plant generally produces only one flower head per stem, each head with up to 35 blue or purple ray florets surrounding numerous yellow disc florets. The species grows on ridges, rocky slopes, and outcroppings.

The "Marysvale" part of the common name refers to the community of Marysvale, Utah, where the type specimen was collected.
