= Mount Baldy (Beaver County, Utah) =

Mountain in the American state of Utah

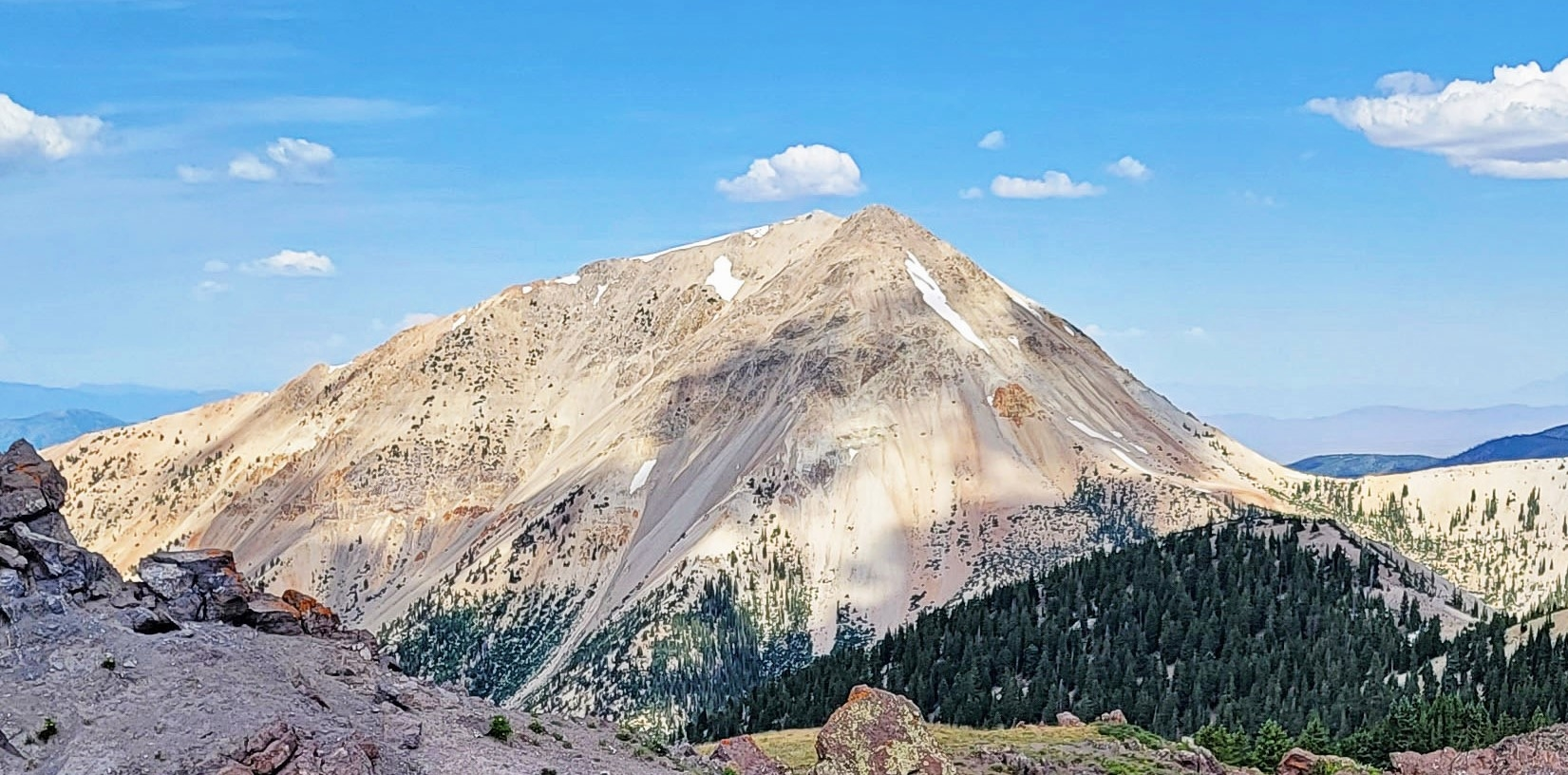
- East aspect

Highest point
- Elevation: 12,085 ft (3,684 m)
- Prominence: 1,186 ft (361 m)
- Parent peak: Mount Belknap
- Isolation: 1.68 mi (2.70 km)
- Coordinates: 38°24′06″N 112°26′02″W

Geography
- Location within Utah Location within the United States
- Country: United States
- State: Utah
- County: Beaver / Piute
- Parent range: Tushar Mountains
- Topo map: USGS Mount Belknap

Climbing
- Easiest route: class 2 hiking

Mount Baldy is a summit with an elevation of 12,085 feet (3,684 meters), in the Tushar Mountains in Utah, United States.

== Description ==
Mount Baldy is set in the Fishlake National Forest on the boundary that Beaver County shares with Piute County. It ranks as the third-highest peak in the Tushar Mountains, third-highest in each county and 77th-highest in the state. Precipitation runoff from the mountain drains into the Sevier River watershed. This mountain's toponym has been officially adopted by the United States Board on Geographic Names.

== See also ==
- List of peaks named Baldy
- List of mountains in Utah

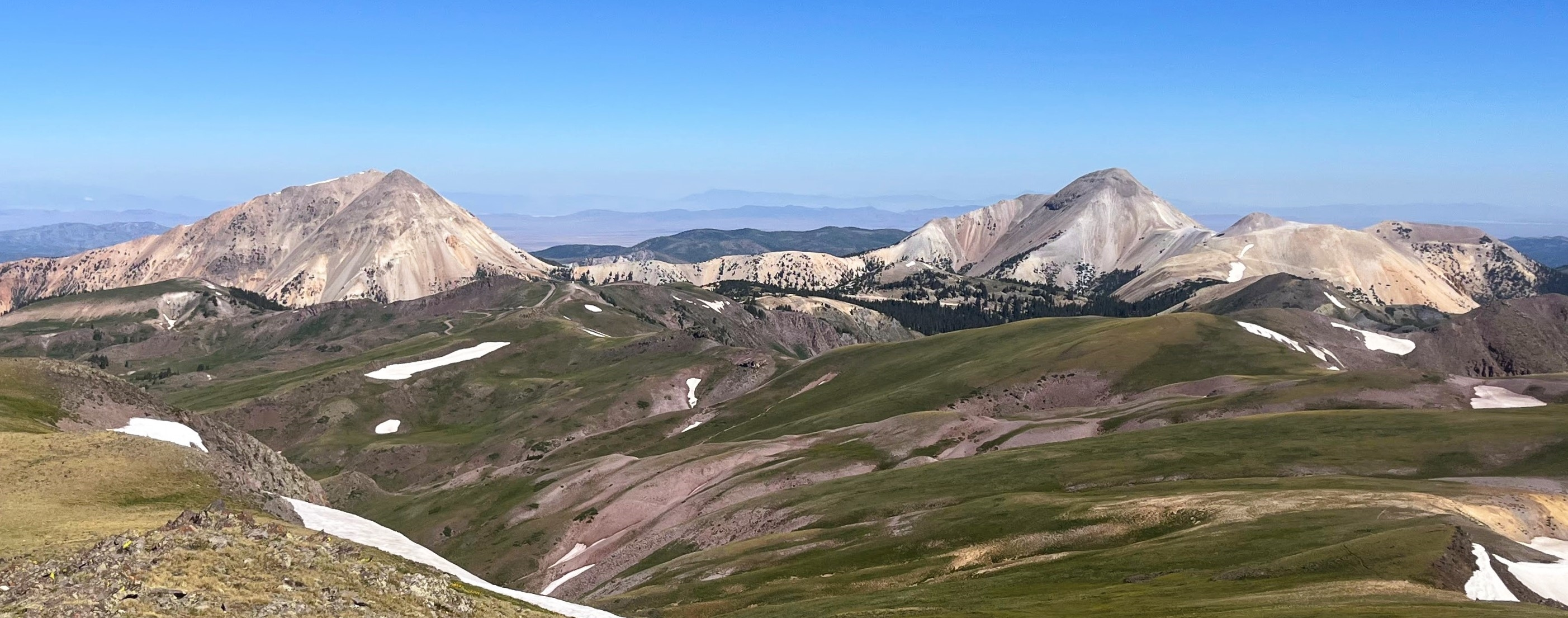
Mount Baldy (left) and Mount Belknap (right)
