= Hatfield–McCoy Trails =

West Virginia off-road vehicle trail system

The Hatfield–McCoy Trails (HMT) is a trail system popular for its recreational trails for ATVs, UTVs, and dirt bikes, but the trails are also open to hikers, mountain bikers, and horse riders. HMT is located in West Virginia's south west counties of Boone, Kanawha, Lincoln, Logan, McDowell, Mercer, Mingo, Wayne, and Wyoming. The HMT trail system is a public–private partnership between private landowners and the Hatfield–McCoy Regional Recreation Authority (HMRRA), a legislatively created quasi-state agency with paid staff and governed by a multi-county board of directors. The HMT project brings in millions of dollars to the West Virginia economy each year.

== Background ==
The name of the trail system is derived from the area's notorious Hatfield–McCoy feud of the late 1800's.

Leff Moore originated the idea of the trail system and was its first executive director. He was followed by Mike and Mark Whitt, Matthew Ballard, and Jeffrey T. Lusk in leading the trails' expansion.

The trail system officially opened under the name Hatfield McCoy in October 2000 with 300 miles (480 km) of trail operations. In 2002, the trail system added an additional 100 miles (160 km) of trails in Boone County, West Virginia. In 2004, the trail system again added 100 miles (160 km) of trail, to bring the trail system to 500 miles (800 km), making it the second largest off-highway vehicle trail in the world, second only to the Paiute ATV Trail in Utah. A 2006 expansion plan for the trail system planned for 2,000 miles of trails with suitable facilities and an Off-Highway Vehicle Park located in Kanawha County (CBER 2006).

Trail system names include Rockhouse (Man/Gilbert), Bearwallow (Logan), Pinnacle Creek (Castlerock), Little Coal River (Water Ways), Indian Ridge (Ashland), Pocahontas (Bramwell), and Buffalo Mountain (Delbarton). As of 2015, Little Coal River and Ivy Branch trails were closed as land changed ownership.

== Management ==
The trail system staff markets the trail system, builds, maps, and maintains the trail system.

Law enforcement officers patrol the trail to assure compliance with safety regulations. Motorized users of the trails must wear a DOT-approved helmet and are prohibited from "doubling" (having a passenger), unless their vehicle is designed for two people.

There is an HMT visitors center in Boone County.

In 2023, the HMRRA announced partnering with a navigation app provider, onX Offroad, to provide mapping information of the trails including trail difficulty ratings, vehicle allowance, trail closures, and trailhead access points. "Quite a few of our trails are in areas with little or no cell service, which makes traditional navigation impossible. The [application] will change all that." Up until then, unsanctioned and user-generated information was being sold containing outdated and unreliable information.

== Impact ==
The money from outdoor sports tourism has helped the local economy as the local coal economy has been shrinking.

According to the West Virginia Department of Transportation in 2011, the Hatfield-McCoy Trail system has been one of the largest economic development projects in West Virginia, managing over 1,000,000 acres of privately owned land for public use, involving over 300 landowners. By fiscal year 2008, annual revenues from user permits topped $1,000,000. The trails have expanded the economy of outfitters, camp grounds, cabins, hotels and restaurants, and nine towns had created direct trail access points.

An impact report estimates that the total economic impact of the Hatfield-McCoy Trails in 2021 was more than $68 million. Over 80% of HMT riding permits were sold to out of state visitors with an estimate of non-local visitor spending in excess of $80 million annually, with approximately $48 million retained in the state.

Other regions have sought to recreate the economic boom experienced by the Hatfield–McCoy Trails project, citing the million of dollars a year in positive economic impact for West Virginia.
