= Marysvale, Utah =

Town in the United States

- Town
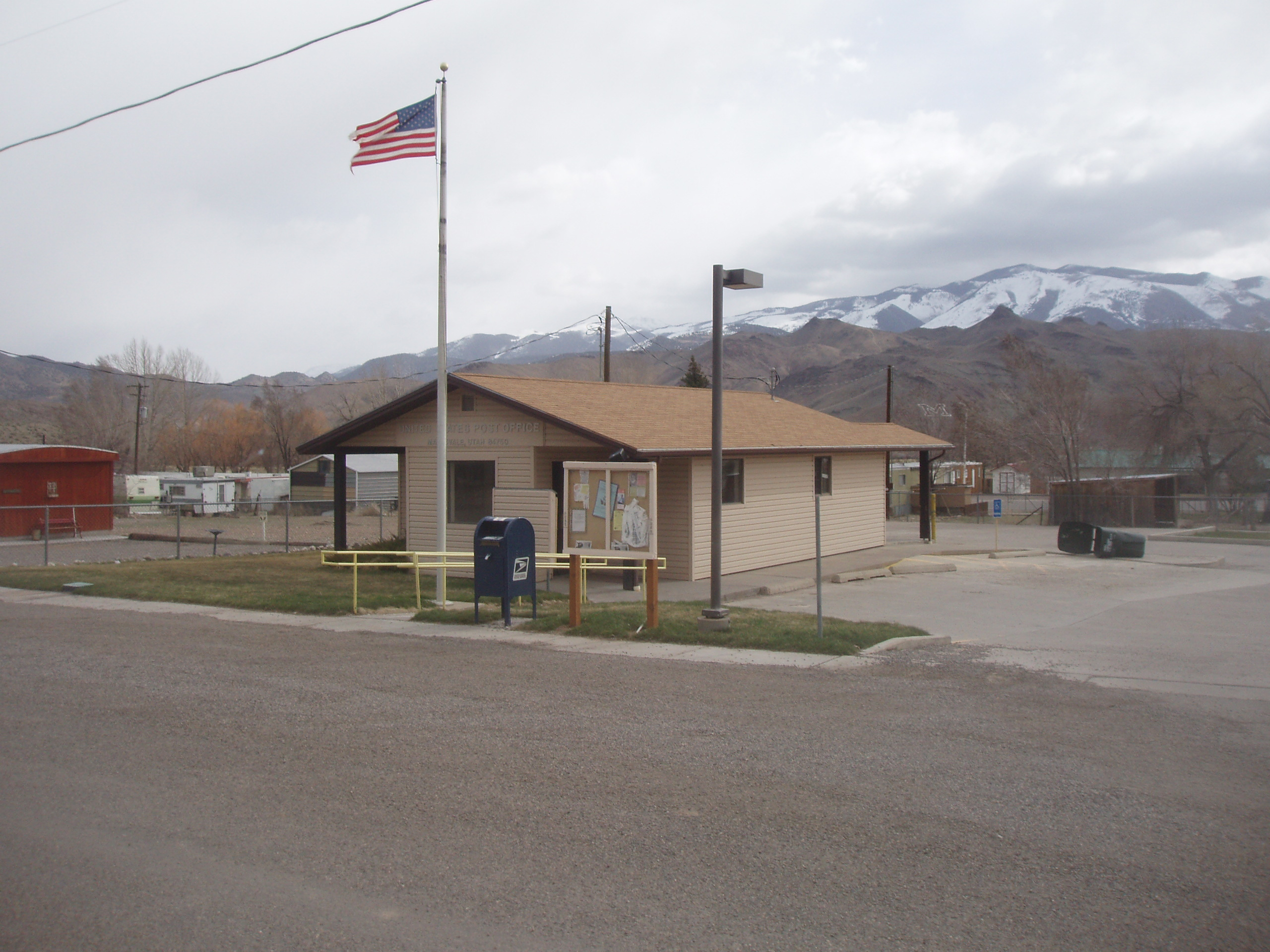
- Marysvale post office

- Location in Piute County and the state of Utah.
- Coordinates: 38°26′51″N 112°13′58″W
- Country: United States
- State: Utah
- County: Piute
- Settled: 1863
- Incorporated: 1913

Area
  - Total: 17.99 sq mi (46.60 km^{2})
  - Land: 17.98 sq mi (46.57 km^{2})
  - Water: 0.012 sq mi (0.03 km^{2})
- Elevation: 5,863 ft (1,787 m)

Population (2020)
  - Total: 356
  - Density: 24.3/sq mi (9.38/km^{2})
- Time zone: UTC-7 (Mountain (MST))
  - Summer (DST): UTC-6 (MDT)
- ZIP code: 84750
- Area code: 435
- FIPS code: 49-48610
- GNIS feature ID: 1443220
- Website: marysvale.gov

Marysvale is a town in Piute County, Utah, United States. The population was 356 at the 2020 census. Marysvale is a trail head for the Paiute ATV Trail.

== History ==
A post office called Marysvale has been in operation since 1872. The town's name probably commemorates the Virgin Mary.

In the late 1860s, silver ore was discovered in the Volcanic Series of Bullion Canyon and Mount Belknap, west of Marysvale in the Tushar Mountains. In 1889, gold was discovered. Then in 1949, uranium was discovered, prompting the United States Atomic Energy Commission to establish an ore purchasing station and field office in Marysvale. The uranium occurs as veins within quartz monzonite, granite and rhyolite, usually in the form of pitchblende, but also as umohoite, which was first identified at Marysvale. The pitchblende has been age dated to the Late Miocene. Total uranium production from the Marysvale area amounted to about 275,000 tons of 0.2 per cent U_{2}O_{8}.

== Geography ==
According to the United States Census Bureau, the town has a total area of 15.1 square miles (39.1 km^{2}), of which 15.1 square miles (39.1 km^{2}) is land and 0.07% is water.

=== Climate ===
The Köppen Climate Classification subtype for this climate is "BSk" (cold semi-arid climate).

Climate data for Marysvale, Utah (1991–2020 normals, extremes 1913–1918 and 1954–present)
Month	Jan	Feb	Mar	Apr	May	Jun	Jul	Aug	Sep	Oct	Nov	Dec	Year
Record high °F (°C)	65 (18)	73 (23)	81 (27)	86 (30)	98 (37)	99 (37)	102 (39)	102 (39)	99 (37)	88 (31)	76 (24)	66 (19)	102 (39)
Mean maximum °F (°C)	56.3 (13.5)	61.3 (16.3)	70.0 (21.1)	78.5 (25.8)	86.9 (30.5)	93.1 (33.9)	97.5 (36.4)	95.1 (35.1)	89.8 (32.1)	82.8 (28.2)	68.8 (20.4)	57.9 (14.4)	97.9 (36.6)
Mean daily maximum °F (°C)	42.8 (6.0)	47.5 (8.6)	56.5 (13.6)	63.4 (17.4)	73.0 (22.8)	84.1 (28.9)	89.6 (32.0)	87.4 (30.8)	79.9 (26.6)	66.9 (19.4)	53.6 (12.0)	42.0 (5.6)	65.6 (18.7)
Daily mean °F (°C)	29.4 (−1.4)	33.9 (1.1)	41.4 (5.2)	47.5 (8.6)	55.6 (13.1)	64.9 (18.3)	70.9 (21.6)	68.9 (20.5)	60.9 (16.1)	49.2 (9.6)	38.4 (3.6)	28.8 (−1.8)	49.2 (9.6)
Mean daily minimum °F (°C)	15.9 (−8.9)	20.4 (−6.4)	26.2 (−3.2)	31.7 (−0.2)	38.3 (3.5)	45.7 (7.6)	52.1 (11.2)	50.5 (10.3)	41.9 (5.5)	31.6 (−0.2)	23.3 (−4.8)	15.7 (−9.1)	32.8 (0.4)
Mean minimum °F (°C)	−3.2 (−19.6)	3.8 (−15.7)	12.2 (−11.0)	18.3 (−7.6)	26.0 (−3.3)	33.7 (0.9)	41.3 (5.2)	40.3 (4.6)	28.8 (−1.8)	17.5 (−8.1)	5.6 (−14.7)	−3.0 (−19.4)	−8.2 (−22.3)
Record low °F (°C)	−27 (−33)	−28 (−33)	−11 (−24)	7 (−14)	17 (−8)	23 (−5)	33 (1)	30 (−1)	20 (−7)	1 (−17)	−14 (−26)	−35 (−37)	−35 (−37)
Average precipitation inches (mm)	0.66 (17)	0.59 (15)	0.68 (17)	0.59 (15)	0.78 (20)	0.37 (9.4)	0.86 (22)	0.91 (23)	0.84 (21)	0.86 (22)	0.59 (15)	0.47 (12)	8.20 (208)
Average precipitation days (≥ 0.01 in)	4.8	6.2	5.5	5.8	4.6	2.7	5.6	6.9	5.4	4.9	3.7	4.2	60.3
Source: NOAA

== Demographics ==
Historical population
Census	Pop.	Note	%±
1880	297		—
1890	259		−12.8%
1900	435		68.0%
1910	495		13.8%
1920	624		26.1%
1930	471		−24.5%
1940	626		32.9%
1950	520		−16.9%
1960	354		−31.9%
1970	289		−18.4%
1980	359		24.2%
1990	364		1.4%
2000	381		4.7%
2010	408		7.1%
2020	356		−12.7%
U.S. Decennial Census

At the 2000 census, there were 381 people, 149 households, and 113 families in the town. The population density was 25.2 people per square mile (9.7/km^{2}). There were 222 housing units at an average density of 14.7 per square mile (5.7/km^{2}). The racial makeup of the town was 98.43% White, 0.79% from other races, and 0.79% from two or more races. Hispanic or Latino of any race were 2.10%.

Of the 149 households, 27.5% had children under the age of 18 living with them, 63.8% were married couples living together, 8.7% had a female householder with no husband present, and 23.5% were non-families. Of the 149 households, 8 are unmarried partner households: 2 heterosexual, 2 same-sex male, and 4 same-sex female. 21.5% of households were one person and 9.4% were one person aged 65 or older. The average household size was 2.56 and the average family size was 2.96.

The age distribution was 24.7% under the age of 18, 6.6% from 18 to 24, 20.2% from 25 to 44, 31.2% from 45 to 64, and 17.3% 65 or older. The median age was 44 years. For every 100 females, there were 96.4 males. For every 100 females age 18 and over, there were 91.3 males.

The median household income was $31,875 and the median family income was $35,417. Males had a median income of $33,125 versus $21,667 for females. The per capita income for the town was $12,715. About 9.1% of families and 11.8% of the population were below the poverty line, including 14.8% of those under age 18 and 2.9% of those age 65 or over.

== Notable person ==
Actress Marie Windsor was born in Marysvale in 1919.

== See also ==
- List of cities and towns in Utah
