= Mount Brigham =

Mountain in Utah, United States

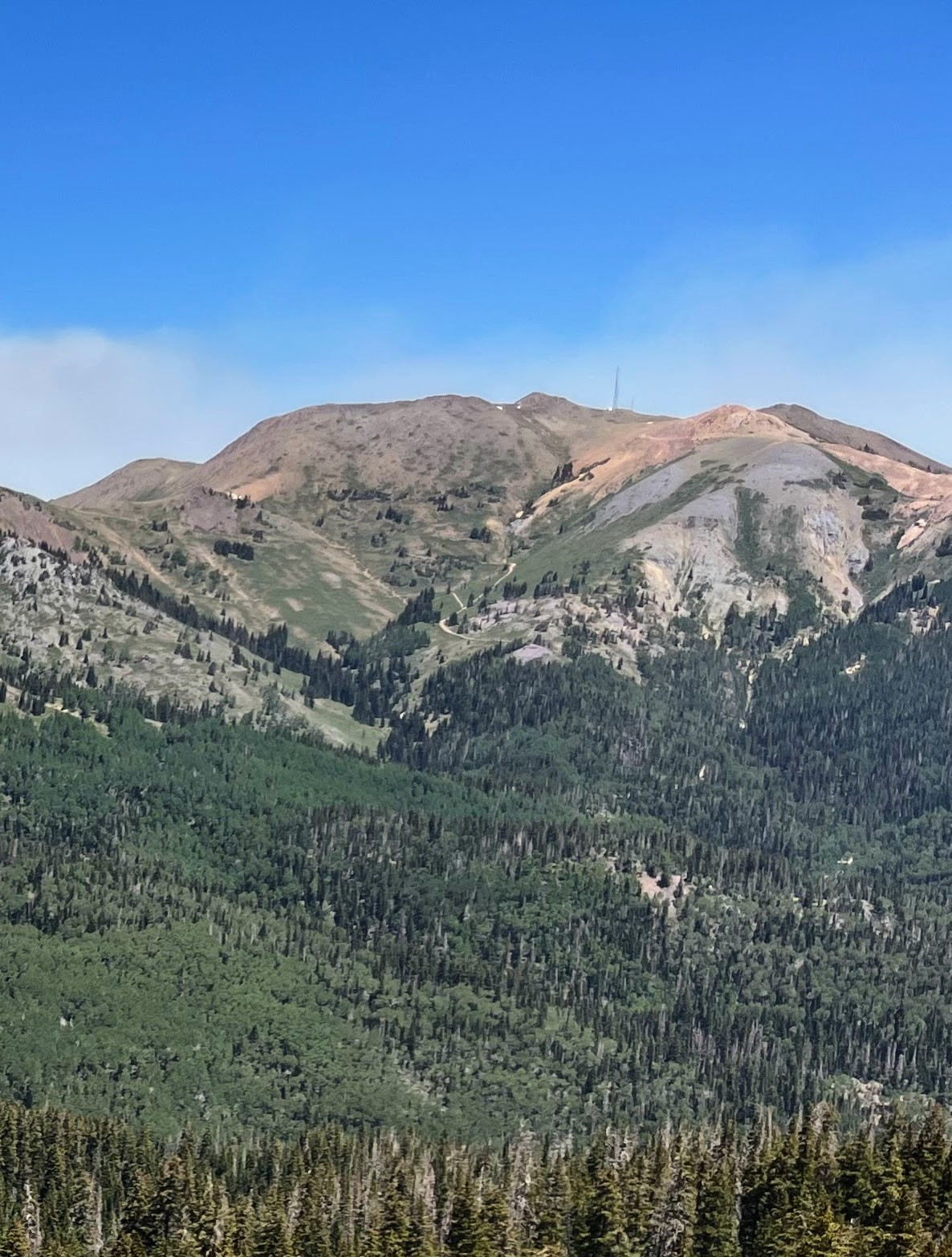
- South aspect

Highest point
- Elevation: 11,770 ft (3,587 m)
- Prominence: 532 ft (162 m)
- Parent peak: Delano Peak
- Isolation: 1.1 mi (1.8 km)
- Coordinates: 38°23′07″N 112°20′09″W

Naming
- Etymology: Robert "Brigham" Yount

Geography
- Location within Utah Location within the United States
- Country: United States
- State: Utah
- County: Piute
- Protected area: Fishlake National Forest
- Parent range: Tushar Mountains
- Topo map: USGS Mount Brigham

Geology
- Rock age: Miocene to Oligocene
- Rock type: Tuff

Mount Brigham is an 11,770-foot-elevation (3,587-meter) mountain summit in Piute County, Utah, United States.

== Description ==
Mount Brigham is part of the Tushar Mountains and it is set in Fishlake National Forest. It ranks as the sixth-highest peak in the Tushar Mountains, seventh-highest in the county and 102nd-highest in the state. Precipitation runoff from the mountain drains to the Sevier River via Twomile Creek, Pine Creek, and Cottonwood Creek. Topographic relief is significant as the summit rises 3,770 feet (1,149 meters) above Pine Creek in 1.75 miles (2.8 km). Mount Brigham is named after Robert Yount, nicknamed "Brigham" or "Brig", who prospected in the vicinity of this peak in the 1880s. This mountain's toponym was officially adopted in 1979 by the United States Board on Geographic Names. There are mining claims, a road, and a communications tower on the mountain. The mountain is composed of Miocene Delano Peak Tuff overlaying Oligocene Three Creeks Tuff.

== Climate ==
Based on the Köppen climate classification, Mount Brigham is located in a dry summer subarctic climate zone (Köppen Dsc) with cold snowy winters and mild summers.

== See also ==
- List of mountains in Utah
