= Mount Belknap (Utah) =

Mountain in Utah, United States

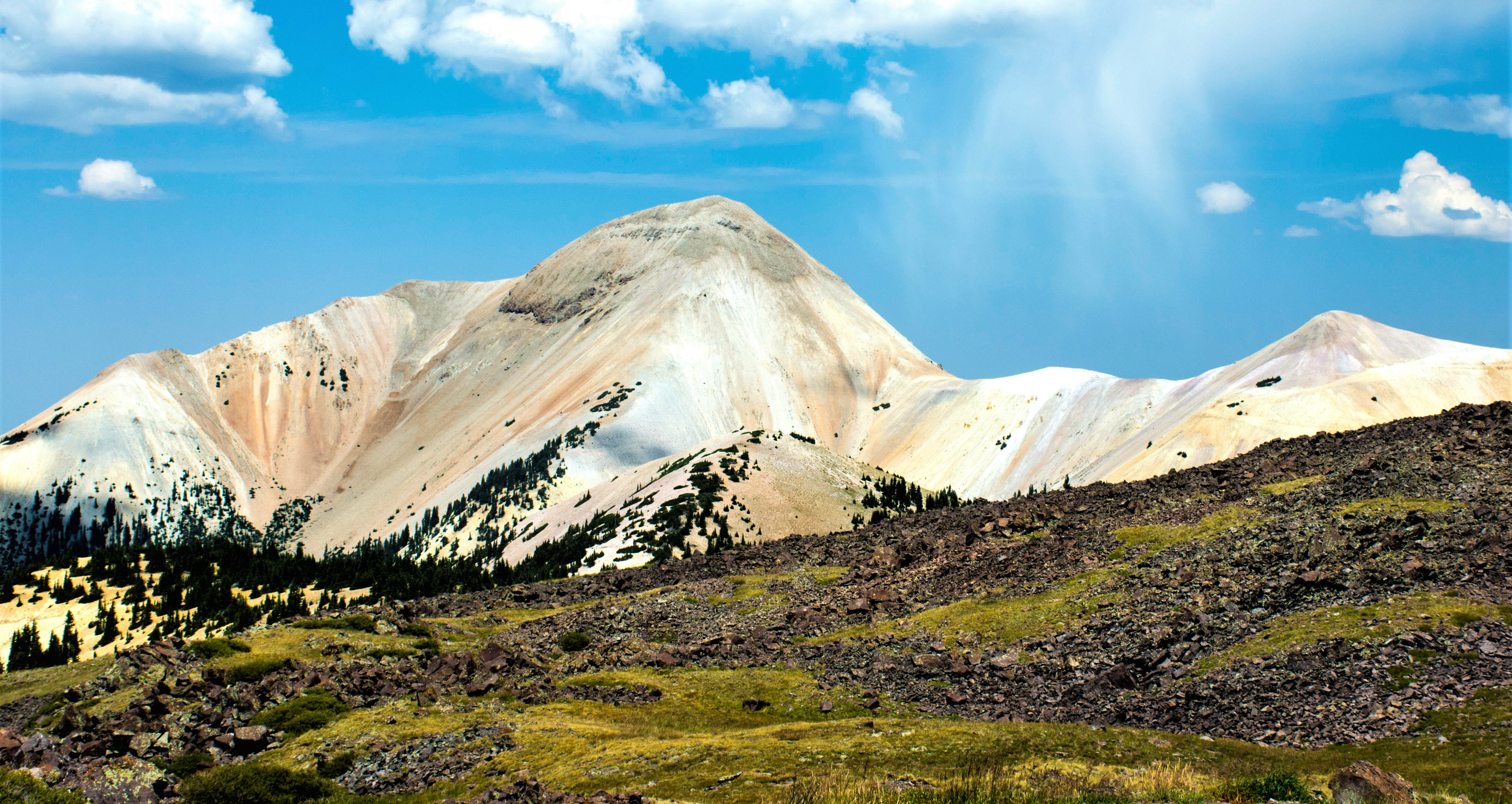
- South aspect

Highest point
- Elevation: 12,143 ft (3,701 m)
- Prominence: 1,192 ft (363 m)
- Parent peak: Delano Peak
- Isolation: 4.12 mi (6.63 km)
- Coordinates: 38°25′09″N 112°24′45″W

Naming
- Etymology: William W. Belknap

Geography
- Location within Utah Location within the United States
- Country: United States
- State: Utah
- County: Beaver / Piute
- Protected area: Fishlake National Forest
- Parent range: Tushar Mountains
- Topo map: USGS Mount Belknap

Geology
- Rock age: Miocene
- Mountain type: Volcanic field
- Rock type: Rhyolite (volcanic rock)
- Volcanic field: Marysvale volcanic field

Climbing
- Easiest route: class 1+ hiking

Mount Belknap is a 12,143-foot-elevation (3,701-meter) mountain summit in the Tushar Mountains of Utah, United States.

== Description ==
Mount Belknap is set in the Fishlake National Forest on the boundary that Beaver County shares with Piute County. It ranks as the second-highest peak in the Tushar Mountains, second-highest in each county and 73rd-highest in the state. Precipitation runoff from the mountain drains into the Sevier River watershed via Blue Lake Creek, Fish Creek, and Beaver Creek. Topographic relief is significant as the summit rises over 2,700 feet (823 meters) above Fish Creek in one mile (1.6 km). Mount Belknap is named after William Worth Belknap (1829–1890), the United States Secretary of War who served under President Ulysses S. Grant. This mountain's toponym has been officially adopted by the United States Board on Geographic Names.

== Climate ==
Based on the Köppen climate classification, Mount Belknap is located in a dry summer subarctic climate zone (Köppen Dsc) with cold snowy winters and mild summers.

== Gallery ==
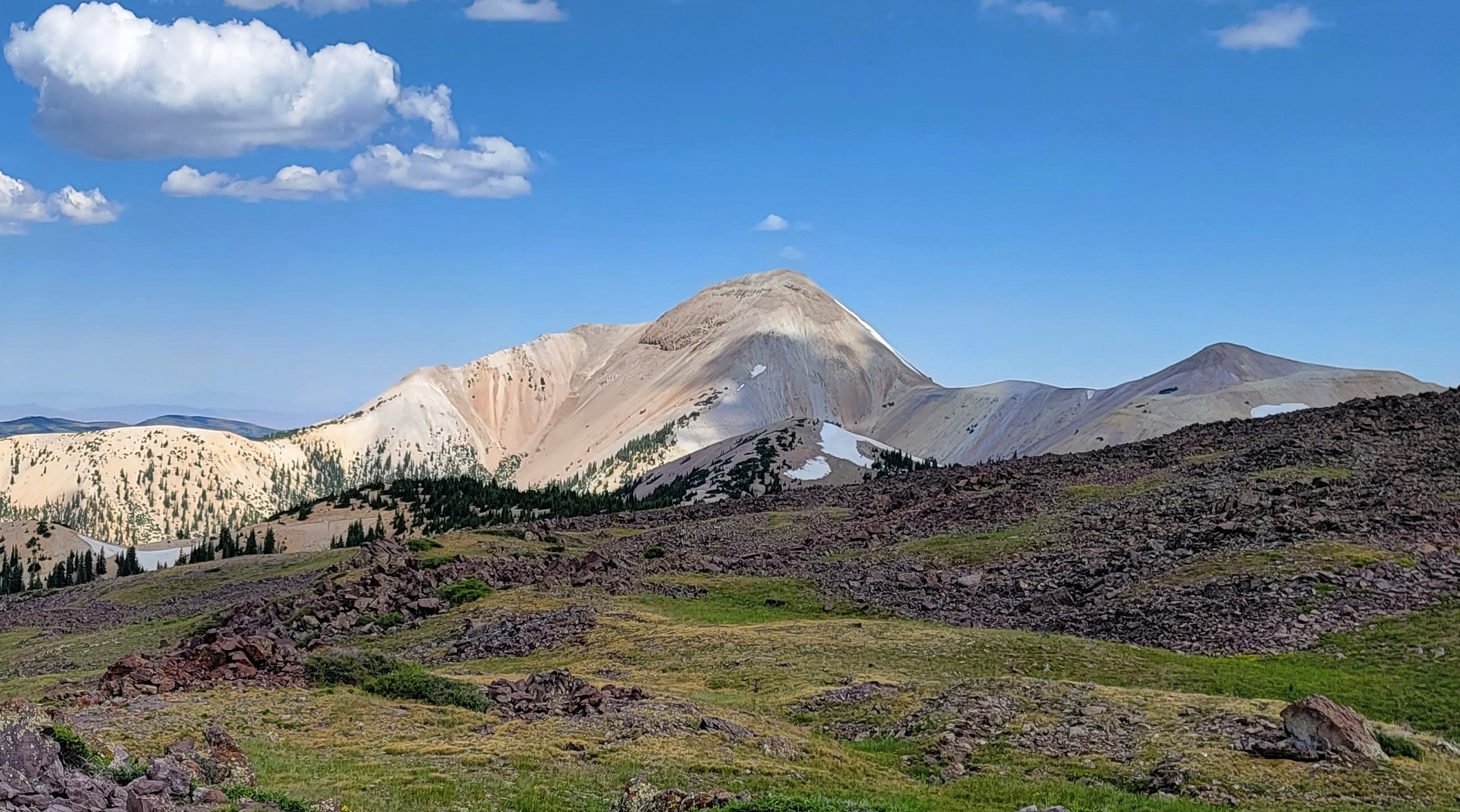
South aspect

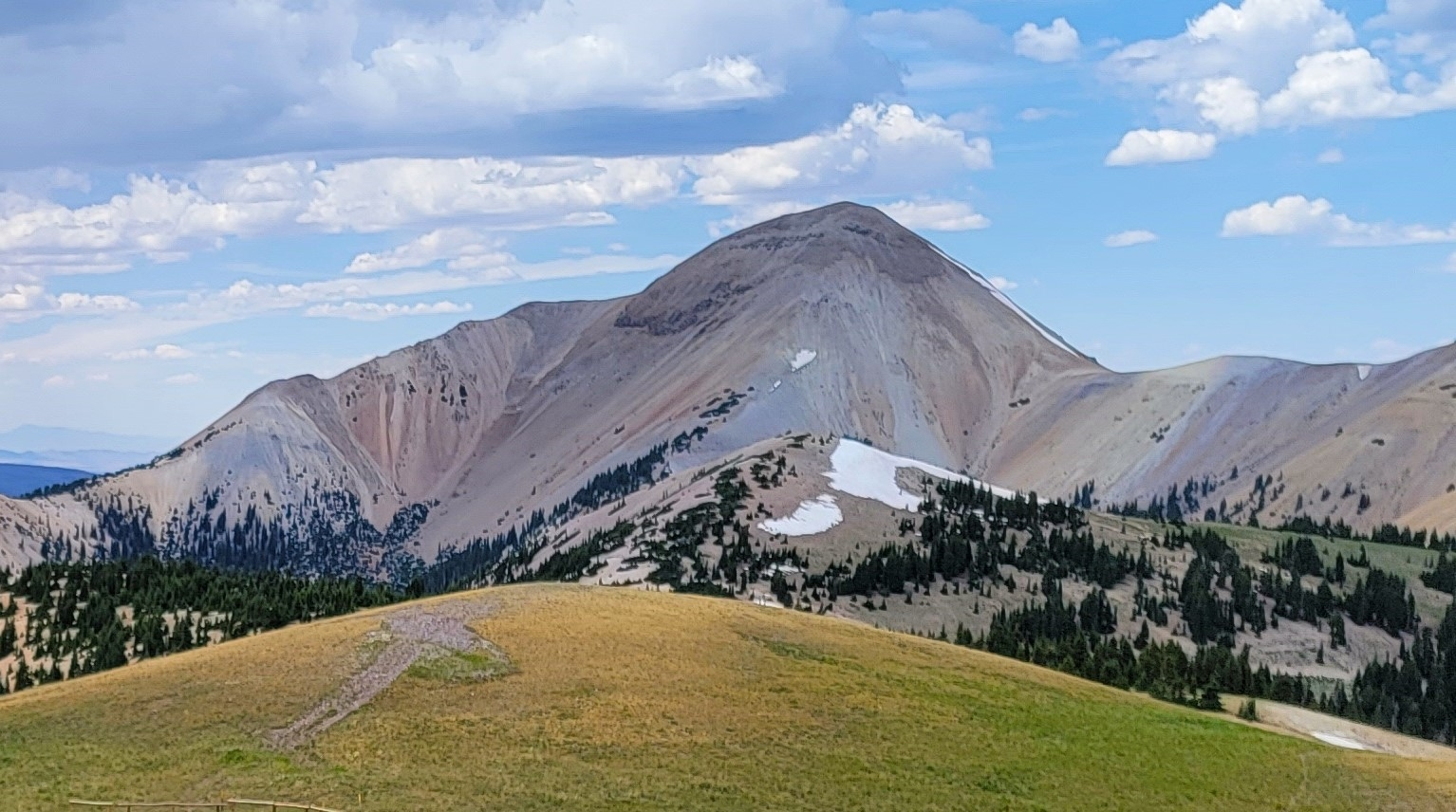
South aspect

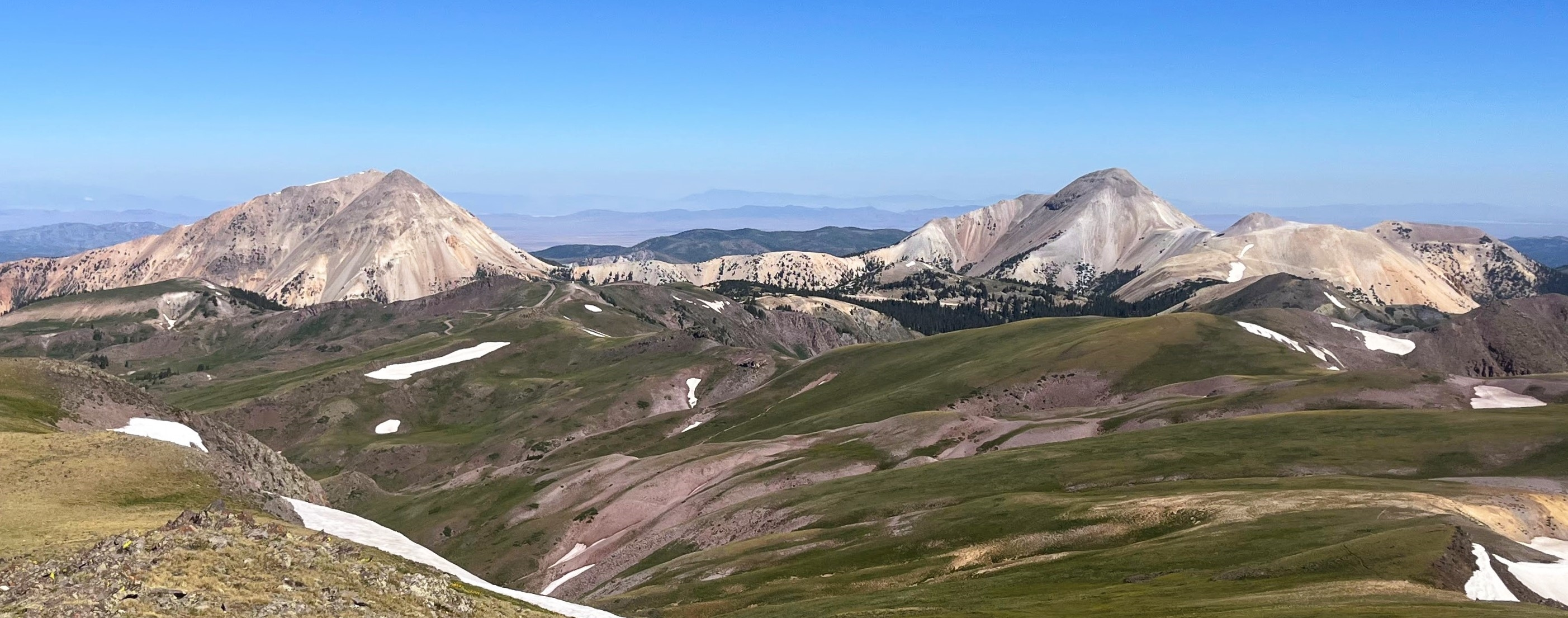
Mount Baldy (left) and Mount Belknap (right)

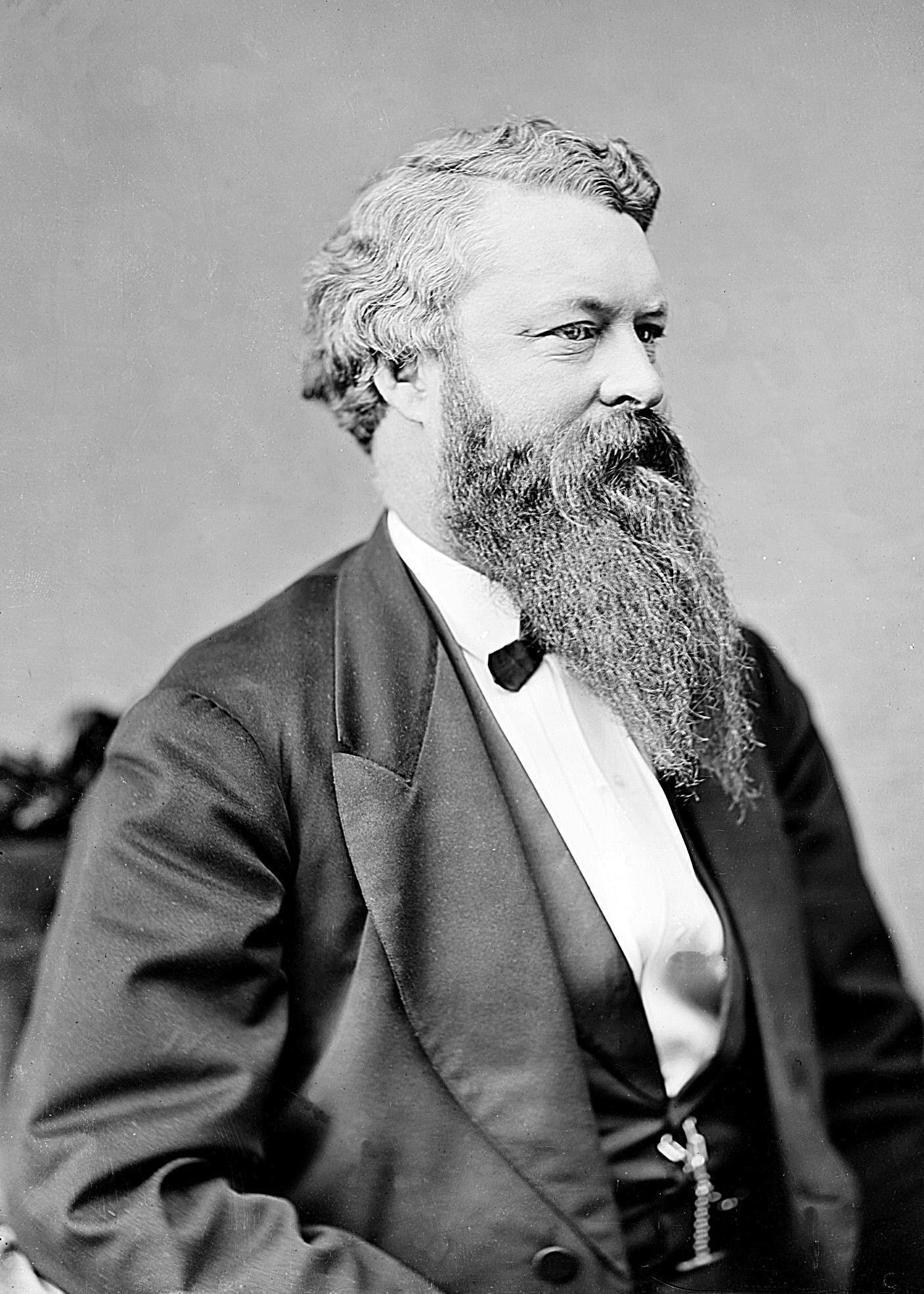
William W. Belknap

== See also ==
- List of mountains in Utah
