= Tushar Mountains =

Mountain range in Utah, United States

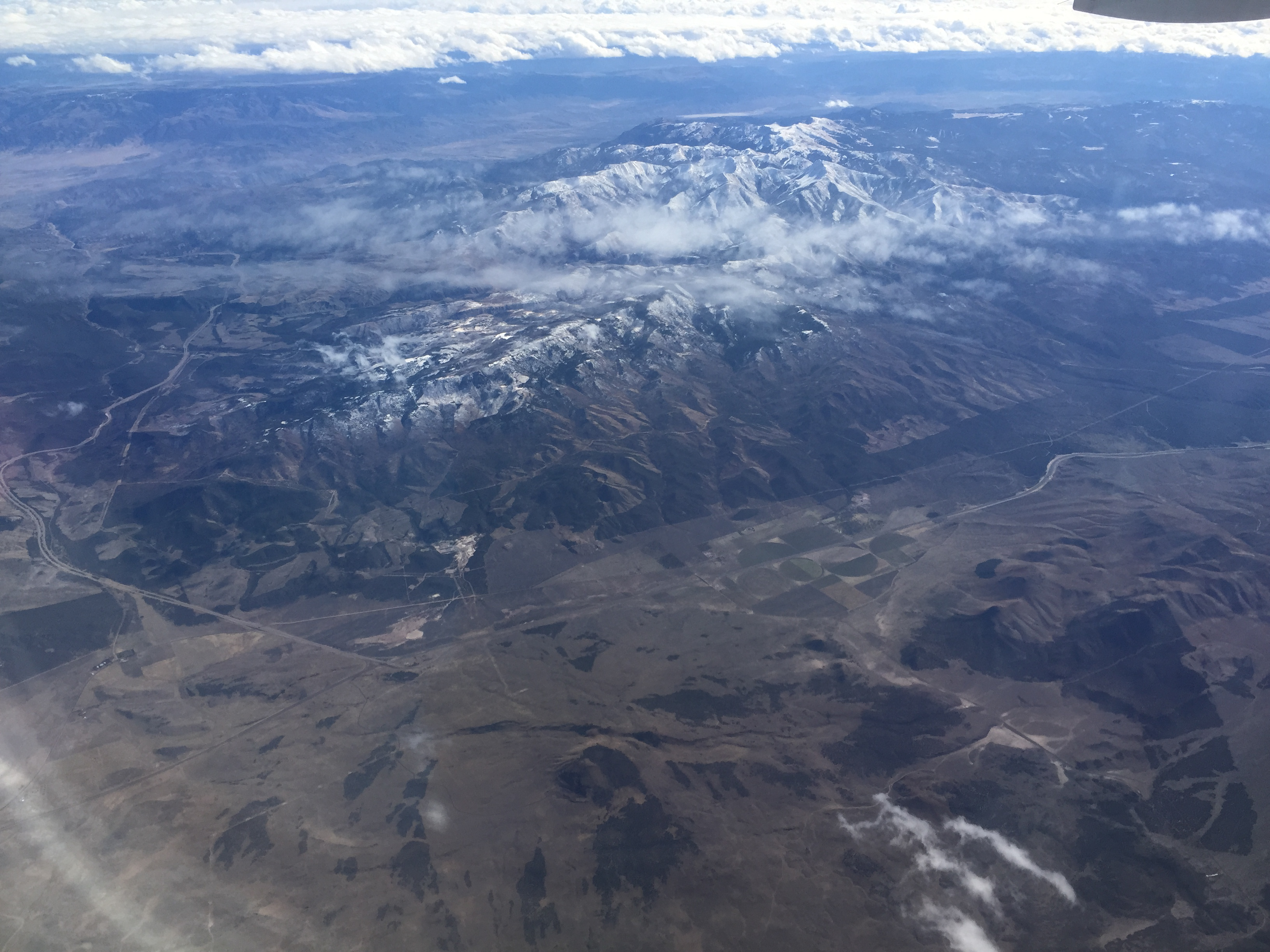
- View looking southeast from an airplane

Highest point
- Peak: Delano Peak
- Elevation: 12,174 ft (3,711 m)
- Coordinates: 38°22′09″N 112°22′17″W

Geography
- Location within Utah
- Country: United States
- State: Utah
- Counties: Beaver, Piute and Sevier
- Borders on: Mineral Mountains, Pavant Range, Sevier Plateau, Piute Reservoir, Parowan Valley and Hurricane Cliffs

The Tushar Mountains are the third-highest mountain range in Utah after the Uinta Mountains and the La Sal Range. Located in the Fishlake National Forest, Delano Peak, 12,174 ft (3,711 m) NAVD 88, is the highest point in both Beaver and Piute counties and has a prominence of 4,689 ft (1,429 m). Delano Peak is named for Columbus Delano (1809–1896), Secretary of the Interior, during the Grant administration. The Tushars receive an ample amount of snow annually even though they are situated within the rainshadow of the Sierra Nevada range in California and the Snake Range located in Nevada.

The main part of the range is in Beaver, Piute and Sevier counties. The northwestern corner extends into the southeastern corner of Millard County, and the southern end extends into the corners of Garfield and Iron counties.

The Tushars are bounded roughly by I-15 to the west, I-70 to the north, US–89 to the east and U–20 to the south. U–153 crosses the southern part of the range between Beaver and Junction.

== Prominent peaks ==
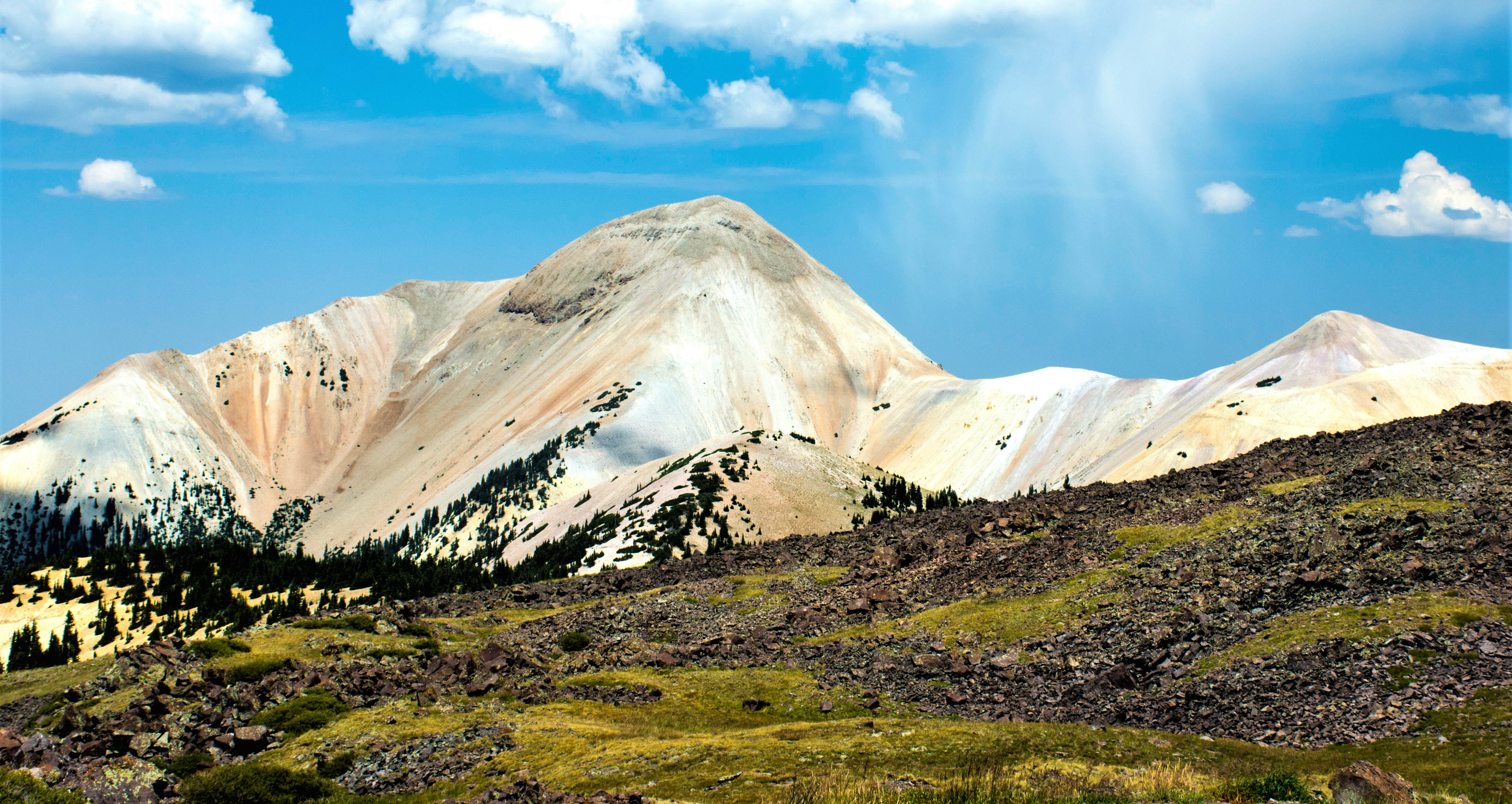
South aspect of Mount Belknap, second-highest in the Tushars

- Mount Belknap 12,143 feet (3,701 m)
- Mount Baldy 12,085 feet (3,684 m)
- Mount Brigham 11,770 feet (3,587 m)
- Edna Peak 11,654 feet (3,552 m)
- Copper Belt Peak 11,358 feet (3,462 m)
- Circleville Mountain 11,338 feet (3,456 m)

== Geology and landforms ==
The peaks of the Tushars were formed between 22 and 32 million years ago by volcanic activity that included a calamitous explosion that blew off the top of a massive peak. At the cusp of the Great Basin, the range also shares characteristics of the Colorado Plateau Province to the east.

Geologically complex, this area dominated by past volcanism, is composed of lava flows, ash flow tuffs from calderas, volcanic domes, cinder cones, rhyolite, basalt-like rocks, conglomerate, and metals such as gold, molybdenum and uranium. The area contains developed and undeveloped geothermal activity, fluorite, and the hydrothermally-altered rocks of Big Rock Candy Mountain.

The Tushars have at least seven high alpine glaciated canyons, Cottonwood Canyon, North Fork of Cottonwood Canyon, South Fork Basin, The Pocket Basin, Bullion Basin, Beaver Basin and City Creek Basin. All were heavily glaciated during the last ice age.

== Climate ==
The SNOTEL weather station, Big Flat, is at an elevation of 10349 feet (3154 m), near the summit of the Beaver Canyon Scenic Byway. Big Flat has a subarctic climate (Köppen Dfc).

Climate data for Big Flat, Utah, 1991–2020 normals, 1989-2020 extremes: 10349ft (3154m)
Month	Jan	Feb	Mar	Apr	May	Jun	Jul	Aug	Sep	Oct	Nov	Dec	Year
Record high °F (°C)	50 (10)	54 (12)	82 (28)	76 (24)	84 (29)	90 (32)	83 (28)	80 (27)	79 (26)	66 (19)	58 (14)	50 (10)	90 (32)
Mean maximum °F (°C)	42 (6)	44 (7)	53 (12)	60 (16)	67 (19)	73 (23)	76 (24)	73 (23)	69 (21)	59 (15)	49 (9)	42 (6)	78 (26)
Mean daily maximum °F (°C)	29.1 (−1.6)	30.8 (−0.7)	38.4 (3.6)	44.2 (6.8)	52.6 (11.4)	62.5 (16.9)	67.8 (19.9)	65.4 (18.6)	58.2 (14.6)	46.0 (7.8)	35.3 (1.8)	28.3 (−2.1)	46.6 (8.1)
Daily mean °F (°C)	20.7 (−6.3)	21.5 (−5.8)	27.3 (−2.6)	32.5 (0.3)	41.1 (5.1)	50.4 (10.2)	56.5 (13.6)	54.7 (12.6)	47.9 (8.8)	37.1 (2.8)	27.0 (−2.8)	20.3 (−6.5)	36.4 (2.5)
Mean daily minimum °F (°C)	12.2 (−11.0)	12.2 (−11.0)	16.2 (−8.8)	20.9 (−6.2)	29.6 (−1.3)	38.3 (3.5)	45.2 (7.3)	44.0 (6.7)	37.5 (3.1)	28.2 (−2.1)	18.7 (−7.4)	12.2 (−11.0)	26.3 (−3.2)
Mean minimum °F (°C)	−6 (−21)	−5 (−21)	1 (−17)	8 (−13)	17 (−8)	28 (−2)	39 (4)	38 (3)	26 (−3)	13 (−11)	0 (−18)	−6 (−21)	−11 (−24)
Record low °F (°C)	−22 (−30)	−16 (−27)	−11 (−24)	−4 (−20)	7 (−14)	17 (−8)	27 (−3)	31 (−1)	15 (−9)	−2 (−19)	−11 (−24)	−24 (−31)	−24 (−31)
Average precipitation inches (mm)	3.67 (93)	3.64 (92)	3.63 (92)	3.41 (87)	2.48 (63)	1.01 (26)	2.01 (51)	2.31 (59)	1.90 (48)	2.63 (67)	2.59 (66)	3.43 (87)	32.71 (831)
Source 1: XMACIS2
Source 2: NOAA (Precipitation)

== Watershed ==
The Tushars contain a variety of intermittent and perennial streams that receive their flow from the annual snowpack. The entire watershed region is divided into two main watershed locations: Beaver River originates in the Tushar Mountains east of Beaver at the confluence of the South Fork and several other creeks and springs. It drains west past Beaver and Milford and the southern end of the Mineral Range then turns north and disappears into the ground at the Beaver Bottoms near Red Rock Knoll and Black Rock in Millard County. In earlier days it was known for its large number of beaver colonies. Jedediah Smith called it "The Lost River" and Dominguez and Escalante called it "El Rio de Tejedor" (The Beaver River).

The Sevier River, extending 383 miles (616 km), is the longest Utah river entirely in the state and drains an extended chain of mountain farming valleys to the intermittent Sevier Lake. The Upper Sevier is used extensively for irrigation; consequently, Sevier Lake is now essentially dry. Sevier Lake is a remnant of Lake Bonneville, a freshwater lake covering much of Utah's western and northwestern portions.

Some of the more prominent creeks and streams are: Clear Creek, Pine Creek, Beaver Creek, Cottonwood Creek, Cullen Creek and other small streams drain into the Sevier River. All the watershed from the Tushars has a final terminus in Sevier Lake, located in western Utah, and is part of the Great Basin. No water reaches any ocean from the Tushars.

The Tushar Mountain range is part of a temperate coniferous forest ecoregion. Common trees include ponderosa pine, Rocky Mountain Douglas-fir, subalpine fir, Engelmann spruce, trembling aspen, and Gambel oak. The Tushars contains several old growth stands of pine, some of which are the oldest in the state of Utah.

== Plant communities ==
Diverse due to elevation change, the Tushars support alpine and sub-alpine vegetation, mountain meadows, dense aspen, sub-alpine fir, Engelmann spruce, five-needle pine, and some Douglas fir, mountain brush, sagebrush steppe, pinion-juniper woodlands, oak, mountain mahogany, and upland mountain grasslands. The area contains endemic species such as the Tushar paintbrush (Castilleja parvula), Tushar bluemat penstemon (Penstemon xylus), and rare and sensitive plants. Recent fires in the area, both natural and prescribed, have greatly benefited vegetation, causing the regeneration of Aspen and other species.

== Recreation ==
Eagle Point ski resort is located on the western slopes and accessed from Beaver. The Tushar range is home to a host of other outdoor pursuits as well. Hundreds of miles of mountain biking and hiking trails wind through the canyons and alpine valleys of the Tushar Range, offering back-country access. The Tushars are also hosting a vast portion of the Paiute ATV Trail system, one of the longest ATV trails of its type in the United States.

== Naturalness and other unique features ==
The area possesses a degree of naturalness, palpable solitude, and infinite opportunities for primitive and unconfined recreation. The area contains several unique features. The Big Rock Candy Mountain Altered Zone is a site that is of national significance and is either unique to or distinctive of the Colorado Plateau. The Altered Zone is unexcelled in the Colorado Plateau for showing the effects of hot water or hydrothermal alteration of igneous rocks and the development of clays in the weathering process associated with the late phases of igneous activity. The highly altered, brightly colored rocks associated with various igneous intrusions and extrusions make the area distinct and virtually unique in the Colorado Plateau. Also found are outcrops of strongly jointed volcanic glass in Clear Creek Canyon along the I-70 corridor called the Skinner Canyon Ignimbrites, a spectacular development and exposures of columnar joints in the rewelded ash flow tuffs here are almost unique in the Colorado Plateau because of the limited exposures of these types of volcanic rocks.

The Tushars can be easily accessed from several locations: U.S. 89 through Marysvale, Junction and Circleville; I-15 through Beaver, Utah, and from I-70 in Clear Creek Canyon.

== See also ==
- List of mountain ranges of Utah
- Deer Trail Mountain
