= Paiute ATV Trail =

Public trail system in central Utah, US

The Paiute ATV Trail is a public all-terrain vehicle trail system that is located in central Utah. It is managed by the Fishlake National Forest and the Richfield District of the Bureau of Land Management.

The Paiute Trail has over 2000 miles of primary and designated side trails. The main loop of the trail is approximately 240 miles long and covers four counties, Piute County, Beaver County, Sevier County, and Millard County in Utah.

The Paiute Trail has trail heads in Marysvale, Circleville, Junction, Koosharem, Antimony, Angle, Monroe, Richfield, Joseph, Aurora, Salina, Annabella, Elsinore, Fillmore, and Kanosh. Most of these communities allow riding on the streets; the State of Utah now allows street-legal vehicles to run on the highway. The Paiute Trail also has trail heads at the Fremont Indian State Park and Museum.

The Paiute ATV Trail Committee, a non-profit organization consisting of government, city, Sheriff, business owners and local citizens, aids in fund raising and management of the trail system.

== Exploring the Paiute ATV Trail ==
The Paiute Trail system was formed by connecting old roads and trails crossing the Fishlake National Forest with intervening BLM-administered land. Sections of trail were constructed to complete the interconnecting #01 loop. The main #01 trail is 238 miles long, with over 2000 miles of marked side trails and forest roads that are open to ATVs and other recreational vehicles. Much of the Paiute Trail is open to SidexSide Vehicles greater than 50", but there are several two-track trails that are restricted to 50".

Riders may see mule deer, elk, bear, mountain goats, cougars, coyotes, sage grouse, pine hen, pheasants, rabbits, rattlesnakes, wild turkeys, badgers, beavers, hawks, eagles, owls, porcupines, and bobcats.

The main loop of the #01 trail is estimated to take approximately 25 riding hours to complete. However, riders could spend weeks traversing the side forest roads and trails.

== Riding season ==
Many parts of the Paiute Trail are closed seasonally. Riding typically starts in April in the lowlands with some the highest riding closed until mid-July. While spring riding is possible on the lower portions of the trail, snowdrifts usually close the trail over the Tushar Mountains, the Pavant Range and the Sevier Plateau until early July. This part of the trail remains closed until mid-to-late July.

September and October provide some of the best riding weather on the Paiute Trail. At this time of year the days are brisk, the nights cool, the trees colorful, and the chance of precipitation is low. August is also a good time for the high country, although the lower portions of the trail can be hot. After October, storms may close the upper portions of the trail.

== Weather ==
Because of the size of the trail system and the varied geography and altitude, weather can be very extreme, and fluctuate greatly even over the course of hours. Temperatures in excess of 100F in the valley floors can be encountered, while snow covers the trails at higher elevations. Rain storms can come in quickly, and because the mountain ranges can present limited visibility, without much notice. Riders should bring clothing for all types of weather that they may encounter.

== Fuel availability ==
Gasoline is available in most of the populated areas along the trail system. Some of the smaller localities may have limited selection. Notably, Koosharem has only 83 octane gasoline available. While gasoline is generally available, some sections of the trail may exceed the fuel capacity of a vehicle, so spare fuel should be carried as a standard measure. As many portions of the trail climbing out of valley floors rapidly gain 6,000 feet or more of elevation, fuel consumption can be higher than expected.

== Events ==
The Paiute ATV Trail is home to three ATV and SideXSide Jamborees.

The Fillmore National ATV Jamboree, held each June with 14 choices of trail rides for 500 rider The National ATV Jamboree Rocky Mountain ATV Jamboree, held each September with over 70 guided trail rides and 650 riders. The Rocky Mountain ATV Jamboree The Paiute Trail UTV Jamboree held the second week of August has approximately 20 guided rides and approximately 600 riders.

== Map sources ==
There are multiple sources for maps of the Paiute Trail:

- The Marysvale.org web site has a rough map of the trail system on its web page.
- National Geographic Map 708.
- The Paiute Trail committee publishes a 60+ page map book.
- Avenza maps has a digital map.
- Official National Forest Service maps are available free of charge.

== Altitude considerations ==
While the valley floors can be as low as 4,000 feet, much of the trail system is at 10,000 feet or above. This has the potential to cause altitude sickness in persons not accustomed to the conditions. Motor vehicles lose power output at higher altitudes, and vehicles prone to vapor lock will be much more affected at higher altitudes.
