= Delano Peak =

Mountain in Utah, United States

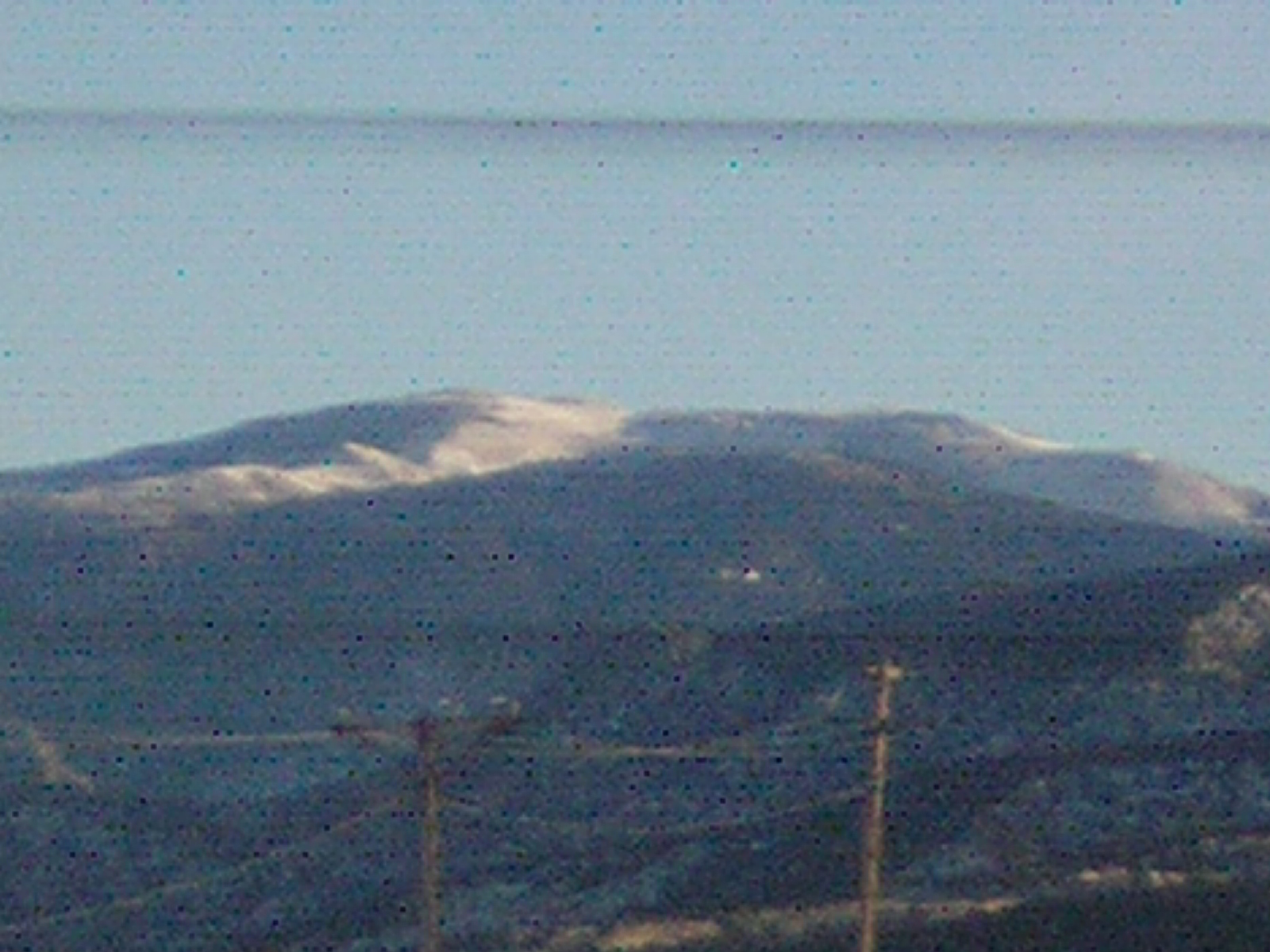
- Delano Peak on January 1, 2006

Highest point
- Elevation: 12,174 ft (3,711 m) NAVD 88
- Prominence: 4,689 ft (1,429 m)
- Listing: North America isolated peaks 111th; Utah County High Points 7th
- Coordinates: 38°22′09″N 112°22′17″W

Geography
- Location: Beaver / Piute counties, Utah, U.S.
- Parent range: Tushar Mountains
- Topo map: USGS Delano Peak

Delano Peak is a mountain in the Tushar Mountains in the Fishlake National Forest in Beaver and Piute counties in Utah, United States.

== Description ==
The peak (pronounced deh-lah-no), is the highest point in the Tushar Mountains and in both Beaver and Piute counties. The Tushar Mountains are the third-highest range in the state, after the Uinta Mountains and the La Sal Range, though Delano Peak itself is surpassed in height by at least thirty-one other Utah peaks. The mountain is named for Columbus Delano (1809–1896), Secretary of the Interior during the Grant administration. Delano Peak is located just east of Beaver, and can be seen clearly from Interstate 70 and Interstate 15.

== Climate ==
Climate data for Delano Peak 38.3652 N, 112.3766 W, Elevation: 11,821 ft (3,603 m) (1991–2020 normals)
Month	Jan	Feb	Mar	Apr	May	Jun	Jul	Aug	Sep	Oct	Nov	Dec	Year
Mean daily maximum °F (°C)	27.4 (−2.6)	27.4 (−2.6)	32.3 (0.2)	37.7 (3.2)	46.4 (8.0)	57.9 (14.4)	64.6 (18.1)	62.7 (17.1)	55.8 (13.2)	45.0 (7.2)	33.8 (1.0)	27.1 (−2.7)	43.2 (6.2)
Daily mean °F (°C)	17.6 (−8.0)	16.9 (−8.4)	21.1 (−6.1)	25.7 (−3.5)	34.2 (1.2)	44.8 (7.1)	51.9 (11.1)	50.3 (10.2)	43.4 (6.3)	33.5 (0.8)	23.9 (−4.5)	17.5 (−8.1)	31.7 (−0.2)
Mean daily minimum °F (°C)	7.8 (−13.4)	6.4 (−14.2)	9.9 (−12.3)	13.7 (−10.2)	22.0 (−5.6)	31.6 (−0.2)	39.1 (3.9)	37.9 (3.3)	31.0 (−0.6)	22.0 (−5.6)	14.0 (−10.0)	7.9 (−13.4)	20.3 (−6.5)
Average precipitation inches (mm)	4.32 (110)	4.20 (107)	4.38 (111)	4.57 (116)	2.85 (72)	1.12 (28)	2.25 (57)	2.79 (71)	2.31 (59)	3.35 (85)	3.45 (88)	4.18 (106)	39.77 (1,010)
Source: PRISM Climate Group

== See also ==
- List of mountains in Utah
