= List of mountain ranges of Utah =

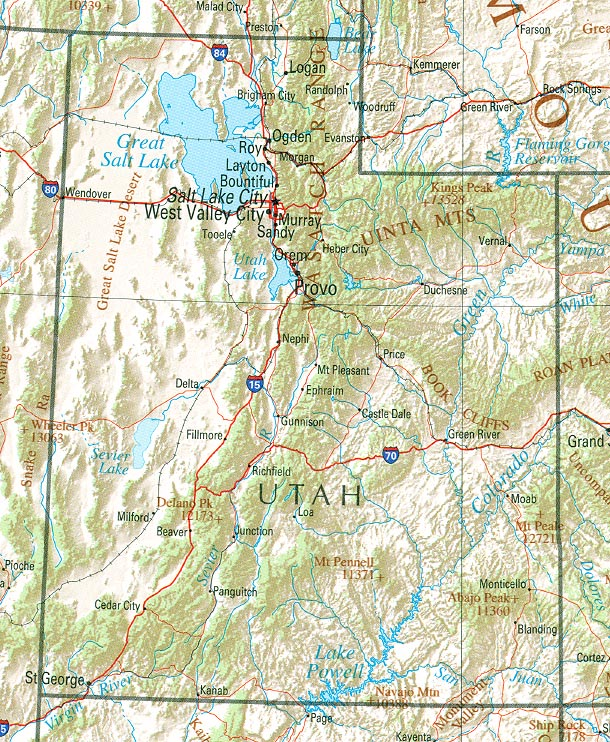
Utah, with landforms

The named mountain ranges of Utah.

== Alphabetical ==
- Abajo Mountains
- Antelope Range (Iron County, Utah)
- Antelope Range (Juab County, Utah)
- Antelope Range (Sevier County, Utah)
- Aquarius Plateau, (* Boulder Mountain)
- Bear River Mountains, (Bear River Range)
- Beaver Dam Mountains
- Beaver Lake Mountains
- Black Mountains (Utah)
- Blue Spring Hills
- Buckskin Mountains (Arizona-Utah)
- Bull Valley Mountains
- Burbank Hills
- Canyon Mountains
- Cedar Mountains (Iron County, Utah)
- Cedar Mountains (Tooele County, Utah)
- Confusion Range
- Conger Range
- Crawford Mountains
- Cricket Mountains
- Deep Creek Mountains
- Drum Mountains
- Dugway Range
- East Tintic Mountains
- Escalante Mountains
- Fish Lake Plateau
- Fish Springs Range
- Gilson Mountains
- Goose Creek Mountains
- Grassy Mountains
- Grouse Creek Mountains
- Hansel Mountains
- Harmony Mountains
- Henry Mountains
- Hogup Mountains
- House Range
- Indian Peak Range
- La Sal Mountains
- Lake Mountains
- Lakeside Mountains
- Mahogany Mountains, (Nevada Border)
- Markagunt Plateau
- Mineral Mountains (Utah)
- Moccasin Mountains
- Monte Cristo Range (Utah)
- Mountain Home Range
- Needle Mountains (Nevada-Utah)
- Newfoundland Mountains
- Onaqui Mountains
- Oquirrh Mountains
- Pavant Range
- Pilot Range
- Pine Valley Mountains
- Promontory Mountains
- Raft River Mountains
- Red Mountains (Utah), (also a Red Mountains (Wyoming))
- Rubber Mountains
- San Francisco Mountains (Utah)
- San Pitch Mountains
- Sheeprock Mountains
- Silver Island Range, Utah
- Simpson Mountains
- Stansbury Mountains
- Star Range
- Swasey Mountain, (the north section of the House Range)
- Tavaputs Plateau, (* Roan Cliffs)
- Traverse Ridge
- Thomas Range
- Tunnel Springs Mountains
- Tushar Mountains
- Uinta Mountains
- Valley Mountains
- Wah Wah Mountains
- Wasatch Plateau
- Wasatch Range
- Wellsville Mountains
- West Hills (Box Elder County, Utah)
- West Hills (Juab County, Utah)

== By county ==
The listing, with county designations.

=== Beaver County ===
- Black Mountains (Utah), Iron-Beaver
- Indian Peak Range, Beaver-Iron
- Mineral Mountains (Utah), Beaver
- Mountain Home Range, Beaver-Millard
- San Francisco Mountains (Utah), Beaver-Millard
- Star Range (Utah), Beaver
- Tushar Mountains, Beaver-Piute-Sevier
- Wah Wah Mountains, Beaver-Millard-Iron

=== Box Elder County ===
- Blue Spring Hills, Box Elder
- Goose Creek Mountains, Box Elder
- Grouse Creek Mountains, Box Elder
- Hansel Mountains, Box Elder
- Hogup Mountains, Box Elder
- Lakeside Mountains, Tooele-Box Elder
- Newfoundland Mountains, Box Elder
- Pilot Range, Box Elder-(Elko County, NV)
- Promontory Mountains, Box Elder
- Raft River Mountains, Box Elder
- Silver Island Range, Utah, Box Elder
- Wasatch Range: (north to south), Cache-Box Elder-Weber-Morgan-Davis-Salt Lake-Summit-Wasatch-Utah-Juab-Sanpete
- Wellsville Mountains, Box Elder-Cache
- West Hills (Box Elder County, Utah), Box Elder-(Samaria Mountains, Idaho-(north))

=== Cache County ===
- Bear River Mountains, Cache-Weber-(Franklin, Co., ID)
- Monte Cristo Range (Utah), Cache-Rich
- Wasatch Range: (north to south), Cache-Box Elder-Weber-Morgan-Davis-Salt Lake-Summit-Wasatch-Utah-Juab-Sanpete
- Wellsville Mountains, Box Elder-Cache

=== Carbon County ===
- Tavaputs Plateau, (west to east), Wasatch-Utah-Duschesne-Carbon-Emery-Uintah-(Rio Blanco Co., CO)-(Garfield Co., CO)-(Mesa Co., CO)
- Wasatch Plateau, Utah-Sanpete-Carbon-Emery-Sevier

=== Daggett County ===
- Uinta Mountains, (west to east), Wasatch-Summit-Duchesne-(Uinta Co., WY)-Daggett-Uintah-(Moffat Co., CO)

=== Davis County ===
- Wasatch Range: (north to south), Cache-Box Elder-Weber-Morgan-Davis-Salt Lake-Summit-Wasatch-Utah-Juab-Sanpete

=== Duchesne County ===
- Uinta Mountains, (west to east), Wasatch-Summit-Duchesne-(Uinta Co., WY)-Daggett-Uintah-(Moffat Co., CO)

=== Emery County ===
- (San Rafael Swell), Emery
- Tavaputs Plateau, (west to east), Wasatch-Utah-Duschesne-Carbon-Emery-Uintah-(Rio Blanco Co., CO)-(Garfield Co., CO)-(Mesa Co., CO)
- Wasatch Plateau, Utah-Sanpete-Carbon-Emery-Sevier

=== Garfield County ===
- Aquarius Plateau, Paiute-Wayne-Garfield
- Escalante Mountains, Garfield
- Henry Mountains, Garfield-Wayne
- Markagunt Plateau, Iron-Garfield-Washington-Kane
- Tavaputs Plateau, (west to east), Wasatch-Utah-Duschesne-Carbon-Emery-Uintah-(Rio Blanco Co., CO)-(Garfield Co., CO)-(Mesa Co., CO)

=== Grand County ===
- La Sal Mountains, Grand-San Juan

=== Iron County ===
- Antelope Range (Iron County, Utah), Iron
- Black Mountains (Utah), Iron-Beaver
- Cedar Mountains (Iron County, Utah), Iron
- Harmony Mountains, Iron-Washington
- Indian Peak Range, Beaver-Iron
- Mahogany Mountains, Iron-(Lincoln County, NV)
- Markagunt Plateau, Iron-Garfield-Washington-Kane
- Needle Mountains (Nevada-Utah), Iron-(Lincoln County, NV)

=== Juab County ===
- Antelope Range (Juab County, Utah), Juab
- Canyon Mountains, Millard-Juab
- Confusion Range, Millard-(Juab)
- Deep Creek Mountains, Juab-Tooele
- Disappointment Hills, Juab-Millard
- Drum Mountains, Millard-Juab
- Dugway Range, Tooele-Juab
- Fish Springs Range, Juab
- Gilson Mountains, Juab
- House Range, Millard-Juab
- San Pitch Mountains, Juab-Sanpete
- Sheeprock Mountains, Tooele-Juab
- Simpson Mountains, Tooele-Juab
- Thomas Range, Juab
- Valley Mountains, Sanpete-Sevier-Millard-Juab
- West Hills (Juab County, Utah), Juab
- West Tintic Mountains, Juab-Tooele

=== Kane County ===
- Buckskin Mountains (Arizona-Utah), Kane & Coconino County, AZ
- Markagunt Plateau, Iron-Garfield-Washington-Kane
- Moccasin Mountains, Mohave County, AZ and Kane County

=== Millard County ===
- Burbank Hills, Millard
- Canyon Mountains, Millard-Juab
- Confusion Range, Millard-(Juab)
- Conger Range, Millard
- Cricket Mountains, Millard
- Disappointment Hills, Juab-Millard
- Drum Mountains, Millard-Juab
- House Range, Millard-Juab
- Mountain Home Range, Beaver-Millard
- Pavant Range, Millard-Sevier
- San Francisco Mountains (Utah), Beaver-Millard
- Swasey Mountain, (the north section of the House Range), Millard
- Tunnel Springs Mountains, Millard
- Valley Mountains, Sanpete-Sevier-Millard-Juab
- Wah Wah Mountains, Beaver-Millard-Iron

=== Morgan County ===
- Wasatch Range: (north to south), Cache-Box Elder-Weber-Morgan-Davis-Salt Lake-Summit-Wasatch-Utah-Juab-Sanpete

=== Piute County ===
- Tushar Mountains, Beaver-Piute-Sevier

=== Rich County ===
- Crawford Mountains, Rich-(Lincoln Co., WY)
- Monte Cristo Range (Utah), Cache-Rich

=== Salt Lake County ===
- Oquirrh Mountains, Utah-Salt Lake
- Wasatch Range: (north to south), Cache-Box Elder-Weber-Morgan-Davis-Salt Lake-Summit-Wasatch-Utah-Juab-Sanpete

=== San Juan County ===
- Abajo Mountains, San Juan
- La Sal Mountains, Grand-San Juan

=== Sanpete County ===
- San Pitch Mountains, Juab-Sanpete
- Valley Mountains, Sanpete-Sevier-Millard-Juab
- Wasatch Plateau, Utah-Sanpete-Carbon-Emery-Sevier
- Wasatch Range: (north to south), Cache-Box Elder-Weber-Morgan-Davis-Salt Lake-Summit-Wasatch-Utah-Juab-Sanpete

=== Sevier County ===
- Antelope Range (Sevier County, Utah), Sevier
- Fish Lake Plateau, Sevier-Paiute-Wayne
- Pavant Range, Millard-Sevier
- Tushar Mountains, Beaver-Piute-Sevier
- Valley Mountains, Sanpete-Sevier-Millard-Juab
- Wasatch Plateau, Utah-Sanpete-Carbon-Emery-Sevier

=== Summit County ===
- Uinta Mountains, (west to east), Wasatch-Summit-Duchesne-(Uinta Co., WY)-Daggett-Uintah-(Moffat Co., CO)
- Wasatch Range: (north to south), Cache-Box Elder-Weber-Morgan-Davis-Salt Lake-Summit-Wasatch-Utah-Juab-Sanpete

=== Tooele County ===
- Cedar Mountains (Tooele County, Utah), Tooele
- Deep Creek Mountains, Juab-Tooele
- Dugway Range, Tooele-Juab
- East Tintic Mountains, Utah-Tooele
- Grassy Mountains, Tooele
- Lakeside Mountains, Tooele-Box Elder
- Onaqui Mountains, Tooele
- Sheeprock Mountains, Tooele-Juab
- Simpson Mountains, Tooele-Juab
- Silver Island Mountains, Juab-Tooele
- Stansbury Mountains, Tooele
- West Tintic Mountains, Juab-Tooele

=== Uintah County ===
- Tavaputs Plateau, (west to east), Wasatch-Utah-Duschesne-Carbon-Emery-Uintah-(Rio Blanco Co., CO)-(Garfield Co., CO)-(Mesa Co., CO)
- Uinta Mountains, (west to east), Wasatch-Summit-Duchesne-(Uinta Co., WY)-Daggett-Uintah-(Moffat Co., CO)

=== Utah County ===
- East Tintic Mountains, Utah-Tooele
- Lake Mountains, Utah
- Oquirrh Mountains, Utah-Salt Lake
- Tavaputs Plateau, (west to east), Wasatch-Utah-Duschesne-Carbon-Emery-Uintah-(Rio Blanco Co., CO)-(Garfield Co., CO)-(Mesa Co., CO)
- Wasatch Plateau, Utah-Sanpete-Carbon-Emery-Sevier
- Wasatch Range: (north to south), Cache-Box Elder-Weber-Morgan-Davis-Salt Lake-Summit-Wasatch-Utah-Juab-Sanpete

=== Wasatch County ===
- Tavaputs Plateau, (west to east), Wasatch-Utah-Duschesne-Carbon-Emery-Uintah-(Rio Blanco Co., CO)-(Garfield Co., CO)-(Mesa Co., CO)
- Uinta Mountains, (west to east), Wasatch-Summit-Duchesne-(Uinta Co., WY)-Daggett-Uintah-(Moffat Co., CO)
- Wasatch Range: (north to south), Cache-Box Elder-Weber-Morgan-Davis-Salt Lake-Summit-Wasatch-Utah-Juab-Sanpete

=== Washington County ===
- Beaver Dam Mountains, Washington
- Bull Valley Mountains, Washington
- Harmony Mountains, Iron-Washington
- Markagunt Plateau, Iron-Garfield-Washington-Kane
- Pine Valley Mountains, Washington
- Red Mountains (Utah), Washington

=== Wayne County ===
- Aquarius Plateau, Paiute-Wayne-Garfield
- Fish Lake Plateau, Sevier-Paiute-Wayne
- Henry Mountains, Garfield-Wayne

=== Weber County ===
- Bear River Mountains, Cache-Weber-(Franklin, Co., ID)
- Wasatch Range: (north to south), Cache-Box Elder-Weber-Morgan-Davis-Salt Lake-Summit-Wasatch-Utah-Juab-Sanpete

== Ranges and related landforms ==
- Abajo Mountains
  - Abajo Peak
- Aquarius Plateau
  - Boulder Mountain (Utah)
  - Thousand Lake Mountain
- Bear River Mountains
  - Logan Peak
  - Naomi Peak
- Cedar Mountains (Tooele County, Utah)
  - Cedar Mountain Wilderness
- Confusion Range
  - Conger Mountain
- Conger Range, Millard
- Henry Mountains
  - Mount Ellen (Utah)
- House Range
  - Sawtooth Mountain
    - Notch Peak Wilderness Study Area
      - Notch Peak
  - Swasey Mountain
- La Sal Mountains
  - Mount Peale
- Lake Mountains
- Oquirrh Mountains
  - Farnsworth Peak
- Pine Valley Mountains
  - Signal Peak
- Red Mountains (Utah)
  - Snow Canyon State Park
- Stansbury Mountains
  - Deseret Peak Wilderness
    - Deseret Peak
- Tushar Mountains
  - Delano Peak
- Uinta Mountains
  - Bald Mountain (Utah)
    - Bald Mountain Pass
  - Hayden Peak (Utah)
  - Humpy Peak
  - High Uintas Wilderness
    - Kings Peak
  - Mount Agassiz (Utah)
- Wasatch Range
  - Ben Lomond Mountain (Utah)
  - Ensign Peak
  - Francis Peak
  - Granite Mountain (Utah)
  - Lone Peak Wilderness
    - Lone Peak
  - Mount Nebo (Utah)
  - Mount Ogden
  - Mount Olympus (Utah)
  - Mount Timpanogos Wilderness
    - Mount Timpanogos
  - Mount Van Cott
  - Mount Wire
  - Pfeifferhorn
  - Twin Peaks (Salt Lake County, Utah)
    - American Fork Twin Peaks
    - Broads Fork Twin Peaks
    - Avenues Twin Peaks
  - West Mountain (Utah County, Utah)
  - Y Mountain

== See also ==
- List of plateaus and mesas of Utah
- List of rivers of Utah
- List of valleys of Utah
