= Red Mountains (Utah) =

Mountain ranges in Utah, U.S.

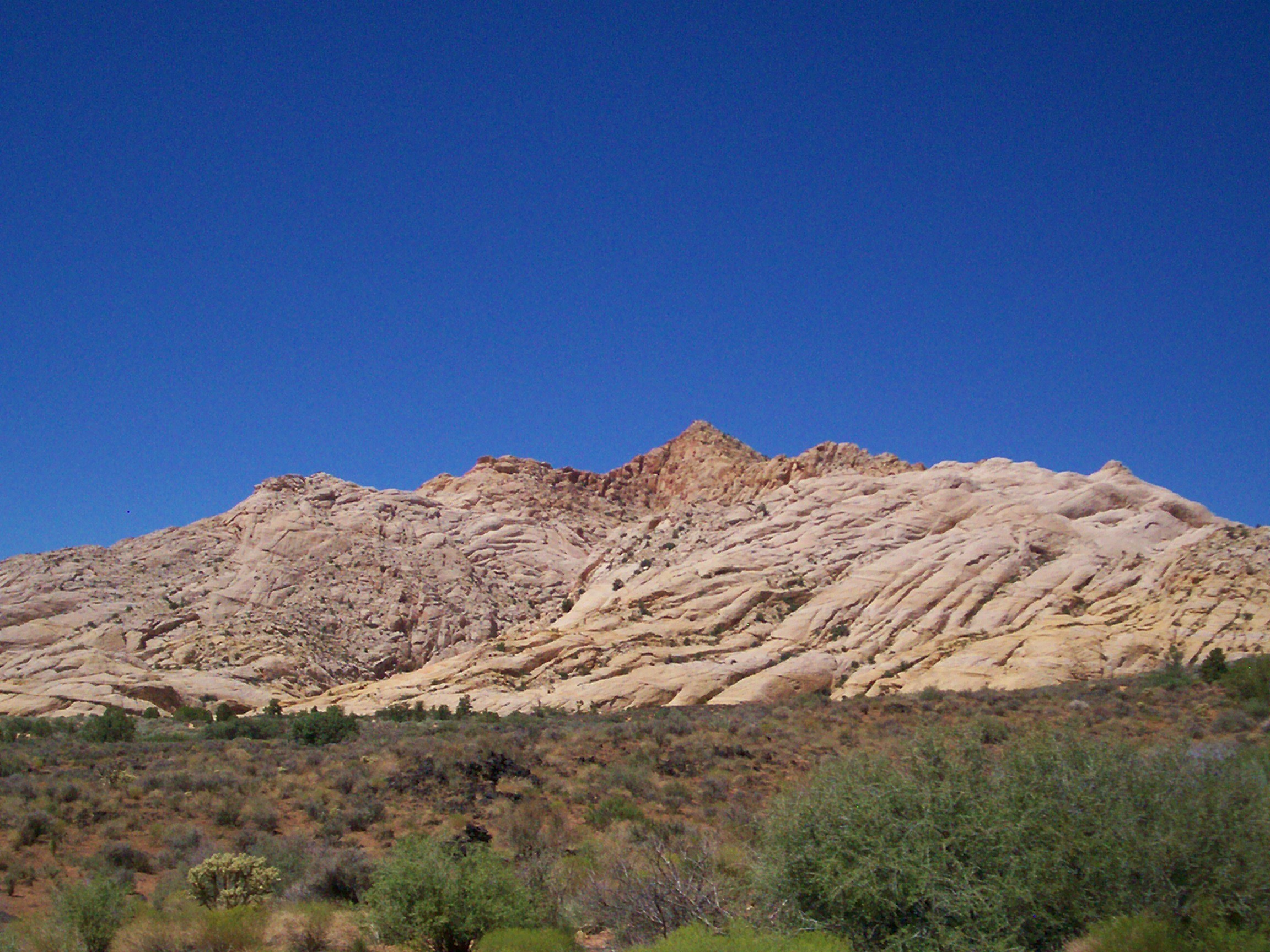

Highest point
- Peak: unnamed?
- Elevation: 4,915 ft (1,498 m)

Dimensions
- Length: 7 mi (11 km) (circular)
- Width: 7 mi (11 km)

Geography
- Location within Utah Location within the United States
- Country: United States
- State: Utah
- County: Washington
- Communities: Veyo, Gunlock, Shivwits, Ivins, Santa Clara and Saint George
- Range coordinates: 37°13′15″N 113°41′16″W
- Borders on: Pine Valley Mountains, Diamond Valley, Snow Canyon State Park, Beaver Dam Mountains and Bull Valley Mountains
- Topo map(s): USGS Veyo and St George NW

The Red Mountains of Washington County, Utah, United States, is a mostly circular 7 miles (11 km) long mountain range.

== Description ==
The small massif of the mountains is surrounded by two large ranges, northwest and northeast, the Bull Valley and Pine Valley Mountains. Bordering southwest is the smaller Beaver Dam Mountains. Between the Beaver Dam and Bull Valley Mountains, are river courses, streams, or washes, and encircling the west and northwest foothills is the Santa Clara River. It has multiple source streams, but the river arises off the southeast, escarpment-type flank of the Bull Valley Mountains, that lies northwest and north of the Red Mountains.

The southeast portion of the Red Mountains contains Snow Canyon State Park, which extends south and southeast beyond the mountains. The park is also about 7-mi in length.

The small Red Mountains are nearly circular except on its southeast where Snow Canyon and West Canyon merge into Snow Canyon.

The highpoint of the range is unnamed, but is about 4,915 feet (1,498 m).

== Access ==
The Red Mountains are surrounded by communities and roadways.

The west and northwest of the range is bordered by the Santa Clara River. Gunlock Road follows the river and the mountain foothills from Veyo at the north, through Gunlock on the northwest flank, and south to the west of Shivwits. From Shivwits at the south foothills of the Red Mountains, Highway 91, (former U.S. 91), leaves Ivins at the mountain's south foothills and connects to Utah State Route 18 at St. George, Utah, about 5-mi from Ivins.

Utah Route 18 follows the entire east side of the mountains. At the range's southeast, a route exits to Snow Canyon State Park; east and northeast, Utah 18 traverses Diamond Valley, with unimproved access routes to the northeast and north of the Red Mountains; also unimproved routes exit northeasterly to the southwest flank region of the Pine Valley Mountains.

== See also ==
- List of mountain ranges of Utah
