= Wheeler Shale =

Geologic formation in Utah notable for trilobite fossils

- Stratigraphic range: Middle Cambrian; ~507 Ma
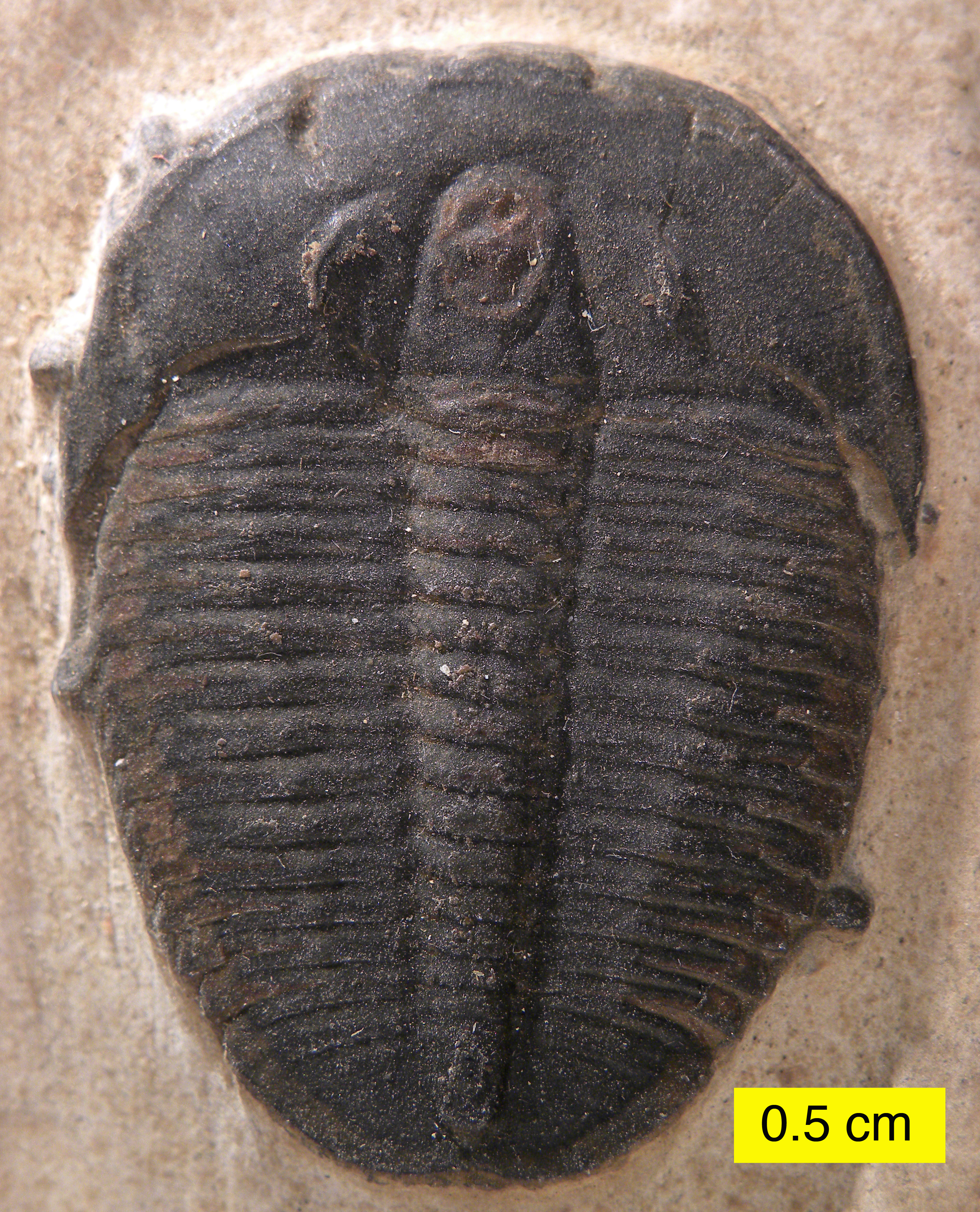
- Elrathia kingii, famed trilobite of the Wheeler Shale.
- Type: Geological formation
- Thickness: 100–200 m (330–660 ft)

Lithology
- Primary: Calcareous shale
- Other: Mudstone, shaley limestone and limestone

Location
- Coordinates: 39.25°N 113.33°W
- Region: House Range and Drum Mountains, Millard Co., west Utah
- Country: United States

Type section
- Named for: House Amphitheater (Geographic feature and type locality)
- Named by: Charles Doolittle Walcott

The Wheeler Shale (named by Charles Walcott) is a Cambrian (c. 507 Ma) fossil locality world-famous for prolific agnostid and Elrathia kingii trilobite remains (even though many areas are barren of fossils) and represents a Konzentrat-Lagerstätte. Varied soft bodied organisms are locally preserved, a fauna (including Naraoia, Wiwaxia and Hallucigenia) and preservation style (carbonaceous film) normally associated with the more famous Burgess Shale. As such, the Wheeler Shale also represents a Konservat-Lagerstätten.

Together with the Marjum Formation and lower Weeks Formation, the Wheeler Shale forms 490 to 610 m (1,610 to 2,000 ft) of limestone and shale exposed in one of the thickest, most fossiliferous and best exposed sequences of Middle Cambrian rocks in North America.

At the type locality of Wheeler Amphitheater, House Range, Millard County, western Utah, the Wheeler Shale consists of a heterogeneous succession of highly calcareous shale, shaley limestone, mudstone and thin, flaggy limestone. The Wheeler Formation (although the Marjum & Weeks Formations are missing) extends into the Drum Mountains, northwest of the House Range where similar fossils and preservation are found.

== Taphonomy and sedimentology ==
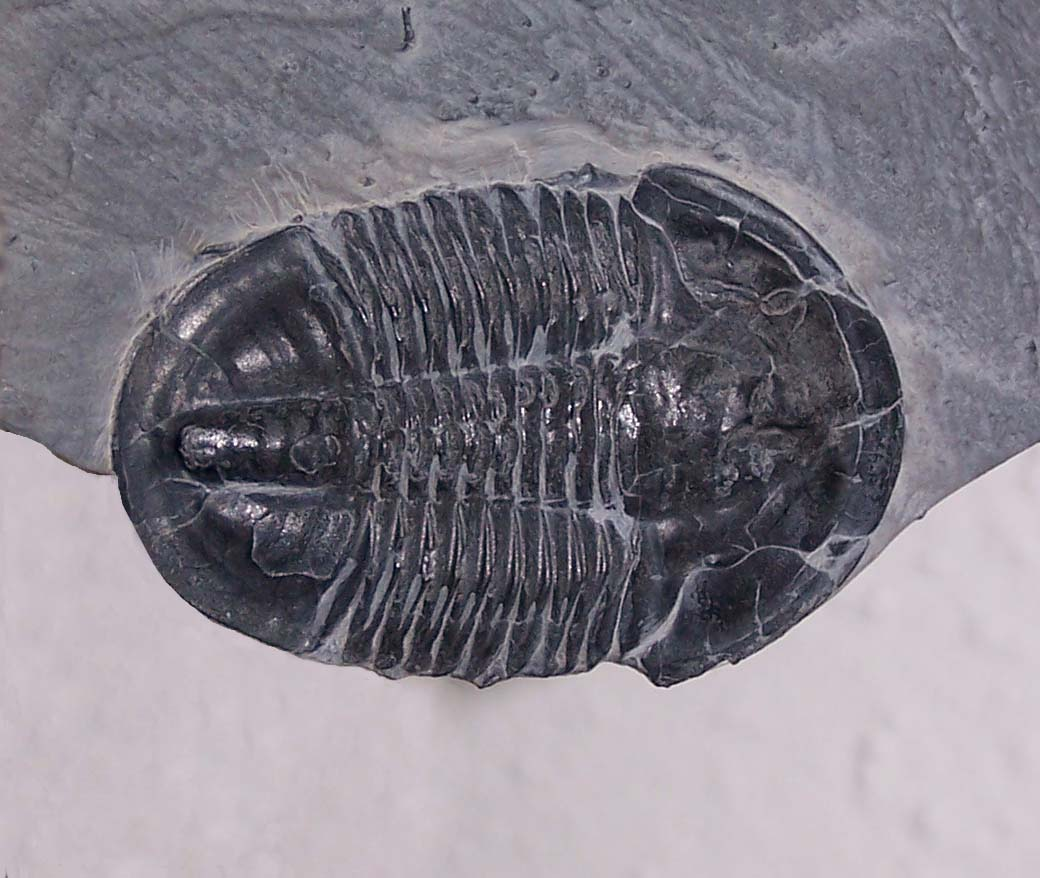
Asaphiscus wheeleri, Cambrian, Wheeler shale, Utah

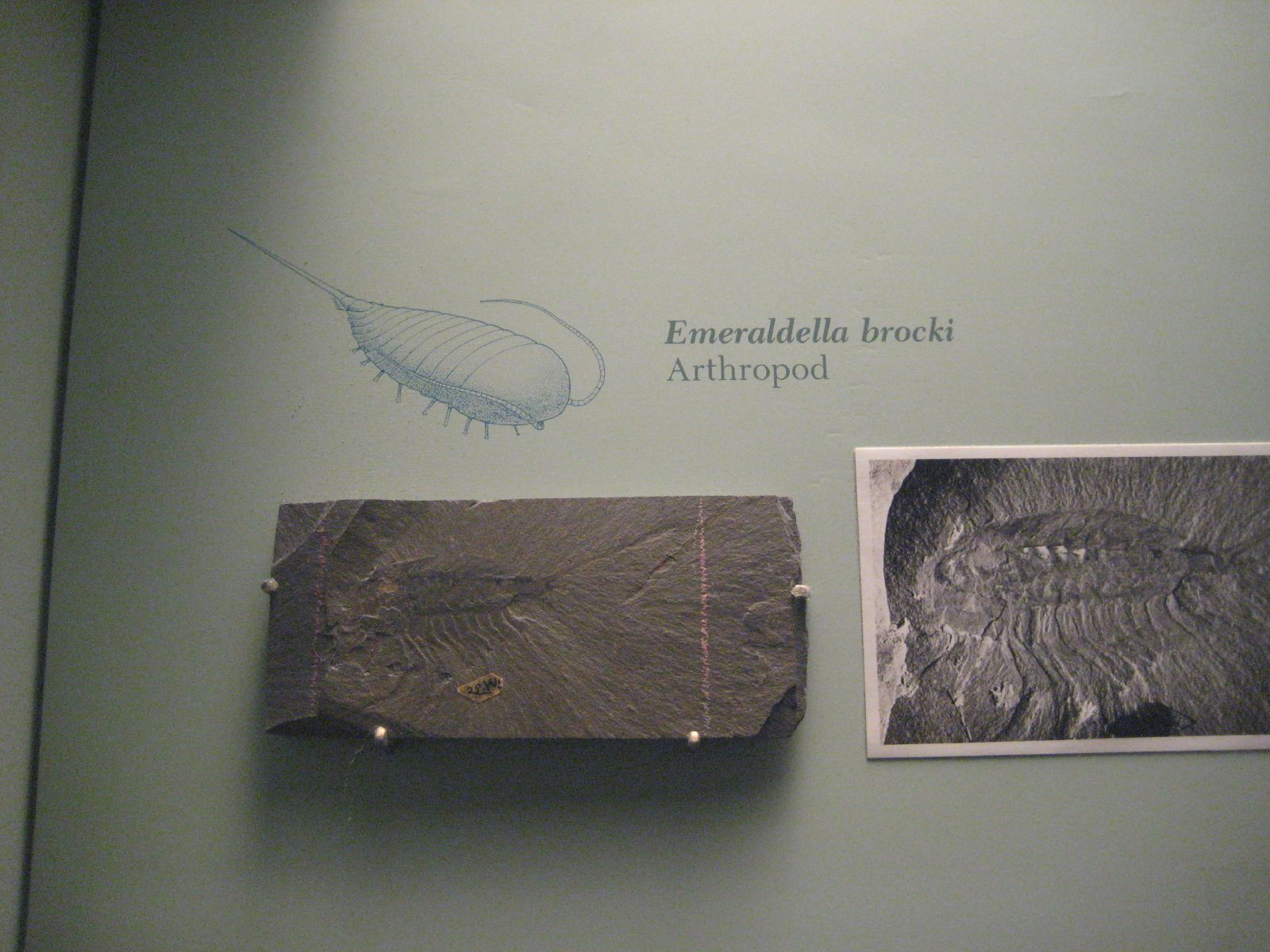
Emeraldella brocki an arthropod From the Burgess Shale

Detailed work recognises a number of ~10 m thick lagerstätten sequences in the formation, each of which formed at a sea-level highstand in deep water. The lagerstätte were deposited by turbidities and mudslides onto an oxygenated sea floor. The productive layers comprise mud and clay particles, with a tiny fraction of wind-blown quartz.

== Stratigraphy ==
The Wheeler Shale spans the Ptychagnostus atavus and uppermost-Middle Cambrian Bolaspidella trilobite zones (See House Range for full stratigraphy).

== Fauna ==
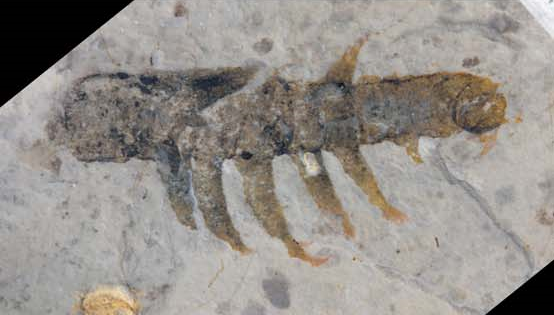
Stanleycaris sp. from Wheeler shale, originally described as Aysheaia prolata

Incomplete list of the fauna of the Wheeler Shale: (Note: the preservation of hard bodied trilobite remains and soft bodied animals seems to be mutually exclusive within particular horizons.)

=== Protista ===
- Marpolia spissa - cyanobacteria or green algae
- Morania fragmenta - cyanobacteria

=== Arthropoda ===
- Alalcomenaeus cambricus - megacheiran
- Branchiocaris pretiosa - hymenocarine
- Branchiocaris sp.
- Cambropodus gracilis - possible myriapod
- Canadaspis perfecta - hymenocarine
- Dicerocaris opisthoeces
- Dicranocaris guntherorum - possible habeliid?
- Emeraldella brocki - vicissicaudatan
- Isoxys
- Leanchoilia superlata - megacheiran
- Megachelicerax - chelicerate
- Mollisonia symmetrica - mollisoniid chelicerate
- Perspicaris dilatus hymenocarine
- Pseudoarctolepis sharpi - possible hymenocarine
- Sidneyia inexpectans - vicissicaudatan
- Tuzoia? peterseni - hymenocarine
- Waptia fieldensis - hymenocarine

==== Dinocaridida ====
- Acanthopahvantia boardmani - radiodont
- Amplectobelua cf. A. stephenensis – radiodont
- Anomalocarididae gen. et sp. nov. - radiodont
- Buccaspinea cooperi? - radiodont
- Caryosyntrips durus - radiodont
- Caryosyntrips serratus - radiodont
- Peytoia nathorsti - radiodont
- Pahvantia hastata - radiodont
- Stanleycaris sp. - radiodont
- Utahnax vannieri - kerygmachelid lobopodian, possibly from Marjum Formation
- Utaurora comosa - opabiniid

==== Trilobita ====
- Naraoia compacta - naraoiid nectaspid
- Hypagnostus parvifrons - agnostid
- Peronopsis amplaxis - peronopsid agnostid
- Peronopsis bidens
- Peronopsis fallax
- Peronopsis gaspensis
- Peronopsis intermedius
- Peronopsis interstrictus
- Peronopsis montis
- Peronopsis segmentis
- Ptychagnostus atavus (= Acidusus atavus) - ptychagnostid agnostid
- Ptychagnostus germanus
- Ptychagnostus gibbus
- Ptychagnostus intermedius
- Ptychagnostus michaeli
- Ptychagnostus occultatus
- Ptychagnostus seminula
- Glyphaspis concavus - asaphid
- Bathyuriscus fimbriatus - dolichometopid corynexochid
- Bathyuriscus sp.
- Kootenia sp. - dorypygid corynexochid, perhaps a synonym of Olenoides
- Olenoides expansus - dorypygid corynexochid
- Olenoides nevadensis
- Olenoides serratus
- Tonkinella breviceps
- Zacanthoides divergens - zacanthoidid corynexochid
- Zacanthoides sp.
- Altiocculus harrisi - ptychopariid (specific name may be confused with Alokistocare)
- Alokistocare harrisi - alokistocarid ptychopariid
- Asaphiscus wheeleri - ptychopariid; second-most common species in the formation
- Bathyocos housensis - ptychopariid
- Bolaspidella drumensis
- Bolaspidella housensis
- Bolaspidella sp.
- Bolaspidella wellsvillensis
- Brachyaspidion microps
- Brachyaspidion sulcatum
- Cedaria minor - known from the Warrior Formation
- Elrathia kingii - alokistocarid ptychopariid
- Elrathia sp.
- Elrathina wheeleri = Ptychoparella wheeleri? - ptychopariid
- Jenkinsonia varga
- Modocia brevispina
- Modocia laevinucha
- Modocia typicalis
- Ptychoparella sp. - ptychopariid
- Ptychoparella wheeleri
- Spencella sp. - ptychopariid

=== Brachiopoda ===
- Acrothele subsidua

=== Chordata ===
- Hertzina sp. - conodont

=== Cnidaria ===
- Cambromedusa sp. - jellyfish

=== Mollusca ===
- Pelagiella sp. - pelagiellid helcionelloid

=== Echinodermata ===
- Castericystis sprinklei - solute
- Castericystis sp.
- Cothurnocystis sp. - stylophoran
- Ctenocystis sp. - ctenocystoid
- Gogia spiralis - eocrinoid
- Eocrinoid holdfasts believed to belong to Gogia spiralis; may belong to other species

=== Porifera ===
- Choia carteri - choiid protomonaxonid demosponge
- Choia utahensis
- Crumillospongia sp. - hazeliid protomonaxonid demosponge
- Diagonella sp.

=== Priapulida ===
- Ottoia prolifica - archaeopriapulid
- Selkirkia sp. - archaeopriapulid
- Selkirkia willoughbyi- archaeopriapulid

=== Unclassified ===
- Hallucigenia sparsa - hallucigeniid lobopod
- Allonnia cf. tintinopsis - a chancelloriid
- Chancelloria pentacta - chancelloriid
- Eldonia sp. - eldoniid cambroernid
- Skeemella clavula - Possible vetulicolian
- Hylolithellus sp. - annelid?
- Wiwaxia corrugata - halwaxiid? lophotrochozoan
- Yuknessia simplex - pterobranch
- Margaretia dorus - tube associated with the hemichordate Oesia
