= Bull Valley Mountains =

Mountain range in the American state of Utah

- Location within Utah

Highest point
- Peak: Lost Peak, Bull Valley Mountains
- Elevation: 7,516 ft (2,291 m)
- Coordinates: 37°28′31″N 113°54′42″W

Dimensions
- Length: 30 mi (48 km) WSW-ENE

Geography
- Country: United States
- State: Utah
- Region: Great Basin Divide
- District: Washington County
- Settlements: Enterprise, Central, Veyo and Gunlock
- Range coordinates: 37°28′31″N 113°54′42″W
- Borders on: Escalante Valley, Escalante Desert, Harmony Mountains, Beaver Dam Mountains and Clover Mountains

The Bull Valley Mountains are a 30-mi (48 km) long mountain range in southwest Utah, located in northwest Washington County. The range is adjacent the Utah border and attached to the Clover Mountains of southeast Nevada. The Great Basin Divide transects the summits of both ranges, with the Escalante Desert north and northeast of the Bull Valley Mountains, and south of the mountains the Colorado River watershed, and specifically the Santa Clara River which drains southeasterly from an escarpment along the mountain range's southeast flank.

== Description and region ==
The Bull Valley Mountains are on the water divide between the Escalante Valley north, the location of Enterprise in the southern Escalante Desert of the Great Basin, and the watershed of the Colorado to the south. Saint George, Utah is 25 mi SSE of the range.

=== State Route 18 ===
Utah Route 18 traverses the base of the southeast escarpment and upper Santa Clara River; Route 18 then goes due north through the east end of the Bull Valley Mountains to Enterprise. The route also travels due south from the escarpment through Snow Canyon State Park, then to Saint George.

A separate route skirts the center of the escarpment's foothills, going from Veyo, then along the Santa Clara to Gunlock; the southwest third of the Bull Valley Mountains is drained southwest into the Beaver Dam Wash, west of the Beaver Dam Mountains. A feeder wash, Jackson Wash is located at the southwest escarpment area; the southwest of the mountain range is in the watershed of the East Fork Beaver Dam Wash, while the main Beaver Dam Wash watershed is between the Clover and Bull Valley mountain ranges.

=== Lower Enterprise Reservoir ===
Lower Enterprise Reservoir, is in the north of the range on Little Pine Creek. The reservoir is just southwest of Enterprise, and about 5 mi due south of Hebron. The reservoir has a historic pioneer dam which was built in the early 1900s. Grassy Creek is the only creek that runs into the reservoir all year long.

=== Pine Park ===
Pine Park is southwest of Enterprise and east of Beaver Dam State Park (Nevada). This area features white hoodoos and a small creek with a campground and picnic area. The creek eventually leads to Beaver Dam State Park just a few miles west of Pine Park.

== Peaks and highpoint ==
Numerous peaks dot the Bull Valley Mountains, most around 5000 ft. The highpoint Lost Peak, 7,516 feet (2,291 m) is in the center-west; Gutz Peak, 7,447 feet (2,270 m) is 2 mi northwest.
