= Maple Canyon =

Maple Canyon may refer to:

- Maple Canyon (San Pitch Mountains), a canyon in Utah
- Maple Canyon (Spanish Fork Peak), another canyon in Utah
