= Square Top Mountain (Utah) =

Mountain in Utah that was the site of a B-52 crash

- Location within Utah

Highest point
- Elevation: 7,053.5 ft (2,149.9 m) NAVD 88
- Prominence: 1,356 ft (413 m)
- Listing: Utah Peaks with 1000 feet of Prominence
- Coordinates: 37°20′35″N 113°53′07″W

Geography
- Location: Washington County, Utah, U.S.
- Topo map: USGS Square Top Mountain

Square Top Mountain is a mountain located in western Washington County in southwestern Utah, United States. Square Top Mountain is located northwest of the city of St. George and west of the smaller community of Gunlock. It is recognizable by its distinctive square shape and flat ridge line. Square Top Mountain is best known for being the crash site of a B-52 Stratofortress on April 11, 1983.

== Geology ==
Square Top Mountain sits within the Motoqua and Gunlock quadrangles of southwestern Utah, in a region that marks the transition zone between the Basin and Range province to the west and the Colorado Plateaus province to the east. The surrounding area is characterized by rugged terrain shaped by millions of years of faulting and erosion, exposing a diverse sequence of sedimentary and volcanic rocks ranging in age from Precambrian to late Cenozoic.

== B-52 crash ==
On April 11, 1983, Square Top Mountain was the crash site of a B-52 Stratofortress. The aircraft, callsign LURE 75, belonged to the 19th Bombardment Wing of the Strategic Air Command. LURE 75 was scheduled to fly from Robbins Air Force Base, Georgia, to Nellis Air Force Base in Las Vegas, Nevada.

During the flight, it was reported by the crew of LURE 75 that the aircraft was experiencing issues with its ground avoidance radar. At approximately 7:15 PM MST, the flight had dropped to an altitude of 3,100 feet while flying in the area of Square Top Mountain. Within a few minutes of descending to this altitude, LURE 75 then attempted to climb, reaching a reported altitude of 6,300 feet. The aircraft then crashed into the south face of Square Top mountain. It is estimated that at the time of impact, LURE 75 was traveling at nearly 370 mph. All 7 crew members were killed on impact.

Near the site of the crash, there is a small marker monument in honor of the crew members of LURE 75. Weighing about 300 pounds, the monument was airlifted into place by a Huey helicopter flown by Detachment 18 of the 40th Aerospace Rescue and Recovery Squadron.
