= Valley Mountains =

Mountain range in central Utah, United States

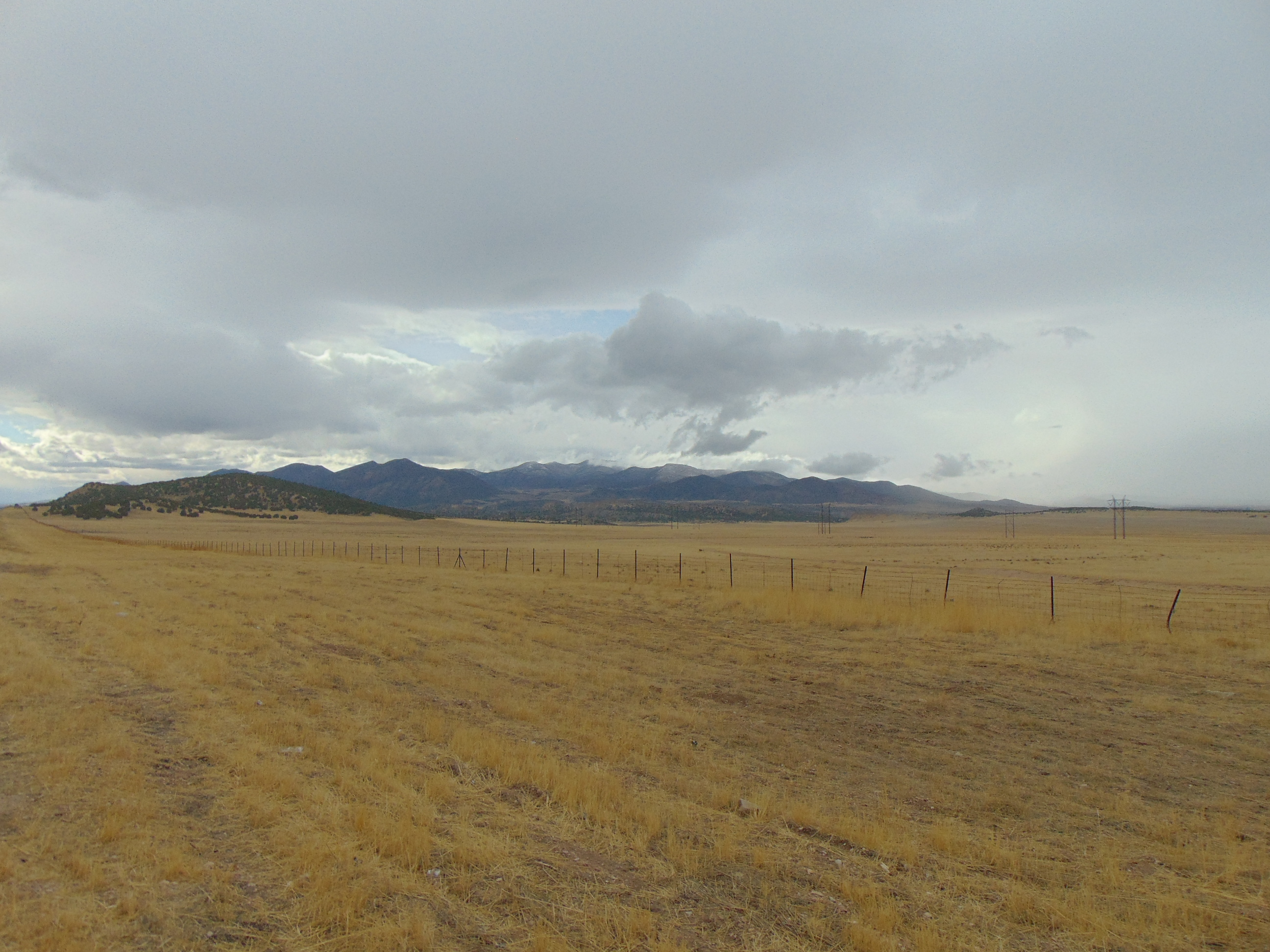
- North end of the Valley Mountains as viewed from Utah State Route 28, November 2020

Highest point
- Peak: Bald Knoll
- Elevation: 6,682 ft (2,037 m)

Dimensions
- Length: 28 mi (45 km) N-S

Geography
- Location within Utah
- Country: United States
- State: Utah
- Region: Sevier River watershed
- Counties: Sanpete, Millard, Juab and Sevier
- Communities: Scipio, Mills, Gunnison and Redmond
- Range coordinates: 39°12′57″N 112°00′05″W
- Borders on: Canyon Mountains, Little Valley, Juab Valley, San Pitch Mountains, Sevier Plateau, Sevier River and Pavant Range

The Valley Mountains are a 28-mile-long (45 km) mountain range located on the southwest border of Sanpete County, Utah, United States, with the northeast border of Millard County. The north of the range is in Juab County; the south in Sevier County.

== Description ==
The range is bordered by the Sevier River, and its corridor, and related valley landforms, three valleys border to the west, and Juab Valley lies to the north-northeast. Though it is a north–south trending range, the center of the range contains a small north-trending valley, Japanese Valley. Various knolls exist on the southwest and south.

The Sevier River borders the range on the north, northeast, east, and southeast. Various cities exist at the east, and southeast; Scipio lies at the northwest foothills. The Sevier Bridge Reservoir (also known as the Yuba Reservoir) is at the Valley Mountains north terminus on the Sevier River, and it is part of Yuba State Park, a 16-mile-long (26 km) park that extends from the north to the northeast on the range's foothills, and on the Sevier River.

The Valley Mountains is a north–south trending range, narrowing at its north and south ends. The range is about 9 miles (14 km) at its widest, with two ridgelines, from the center northwards, on the east and west; from the center to the south, the ridgelines merge into a small mountain region. The southwest contains Dairy Knoll, 6,000 feet (1,800 m), and Three Knolls, 6,149 feet (1,874 m), both on the east perimeter of Round Valley, south of Scipio Lake. Scipio Lake lies at the north of Round Valley as the Valley Mountains meet the northeast terminus and foothills of the Pavant Range. The north section of the Pavant Range is a massif, (as is the Tushar Mountains-Pavant complex), and the highpoint far exceeds elevations in the Valley Mountains. The Pavant terminus just northwest of Scipio Lake is Noon Rock Peak, 7,735 feet (2,358 m).

The Valley Mountains highpoint is at the southern range terminus region, Bald Knoll (Utah), at 6,682 feet (2,037 m), located in Sevier County; U.S. Route 50 (UT-50) passes adjacent to Bald Knoll.

== Access ==
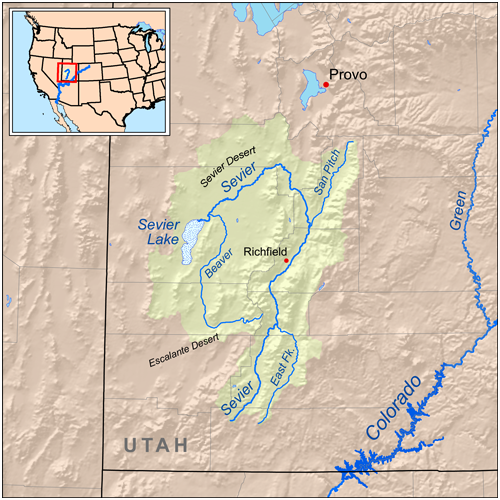
Sevier River watershed, and area landforms

The northwest region of the Valley Mountains can be accessed from Interstate 15, and Scipio; Old Yuba Dam Road transits to the very north of the range, to the Sevier Bridge Reservoir.

From Scipio, south, the entire west of the range can be accessed from UT-50; UT-50 transits south along the west foothills, the east side of Scipio Lake, through Round Valley, then transits southeastwards across the southern foothills to Salina on the Sevier River. Southwest of Salina is Aurora-(on Utah State Route 260, off the foothills).

The entire east side of the range can be accessed from communities along the Sevier River corridor. In the northeast is Utah State Route 28, (Fayette at the southeast of Yuba State Park); in the southeast, U.S. Route 89 passes through Axtell, Redmond, and Salina.

== See also ==
- List of mountain ranges of Utah
