= Swasey Mountain =

Mountain in the American state of Utah

Swasey Peak
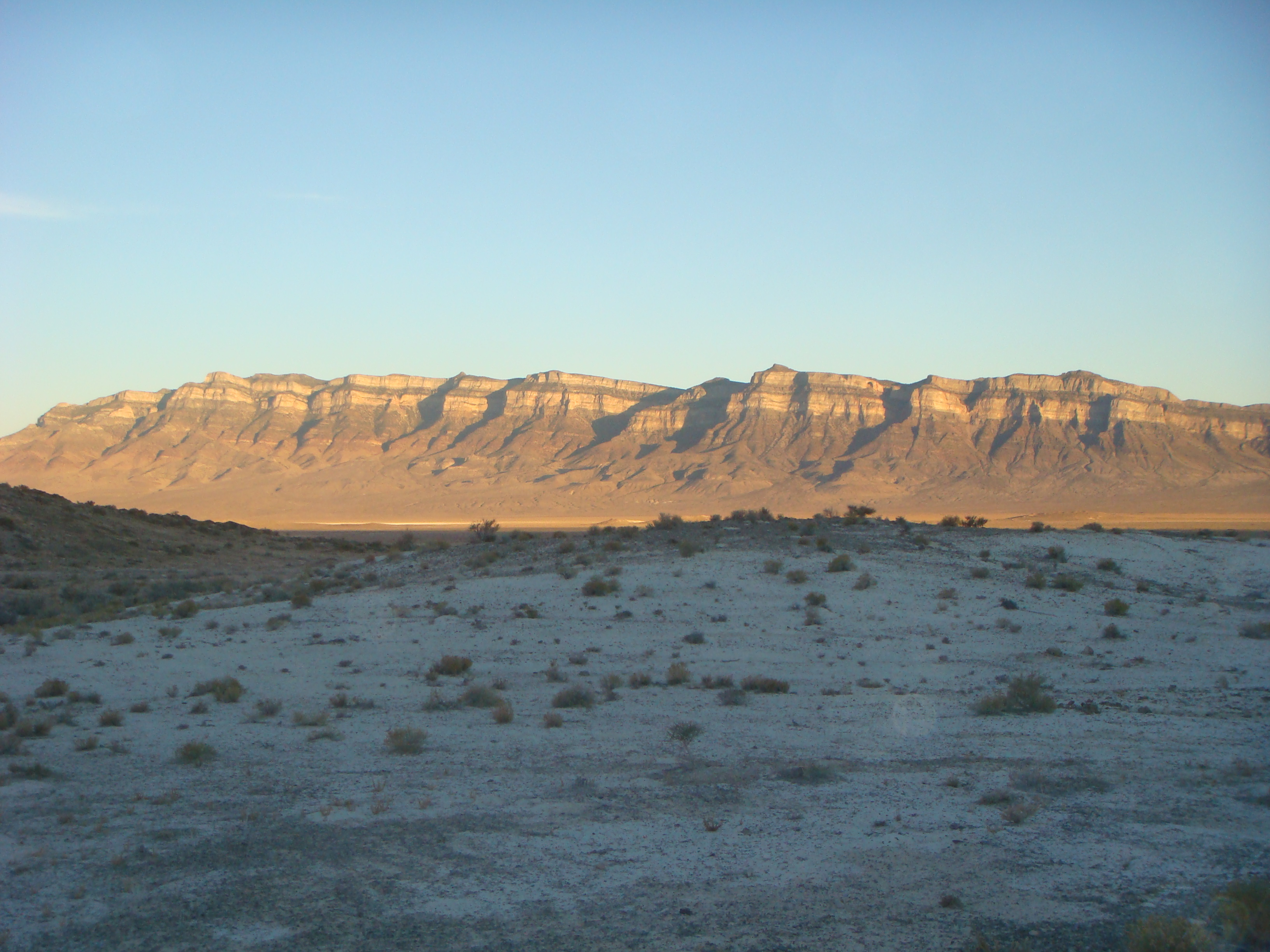
- View of west flank, from Tule Valley

Highest point
- Elevation: 9,673 ft (2,948 m) NAVD 88
- Prominence: 4,509 ft (1,374 m)
- Coordinates: 39°23′17″N 113°18′59″W

Geography
- Location within Utah
- Parent range: Swasey Mountain, House Range
- Topo map: USGS Swasey Peak

Geology
- Mountain type(s): limestone, upper elevations

Climbing
- Easiest route: Swasey Peak from north & northeast, Sawmill Basin Canyon, (west Sevier Desert); Robbers Roost (at Tatow Knob); Robbers Roost Canyon, west Sevier Desert

Swasey Mountain is the north section of the House Range of northwest Millard County, Utah, United States; the extreme north of Swasey Mountain extends into south Juab County.

The Swasey Mountain section contains a north-trending ridge at the west, about 14-mi long; the south of the section is east–west, the mountain shaped like an "L". The south, an east–west section is a massif, with a circular section attached to the southeast.

The highpoint of Swasey Mountain is at the southwest corner of the massif (the L-shape), and is Swasey Peak, 9,673 feet (2,948 m). Another highpoint north, near the center of the ridge line, is Tatow Knob, 8,416 feet (2,565 m).

Swasey Mountain is named for rancher Charles Swasey.

The section of the House Range attached to the south is a shorter, north-trending ridgeline section, Middle Ridge, with mountain passes on both ends; the north has Antelope Springs Road, through Dome Canyon, and Dome Canyon Pass. The south has Old Highway 6 & 50 Road through Marjum Canyon and Marjum Pass.

The south House Range contains Orr Ridge, with three major peaks anchoring the west region, and geographically, shaped much like a circular massif.

Tule Valley lies at the west flank of the mountain. East of the mountain is the Sevier Desert, and to the northeast are the Drum Mountains. The north terminus of the Swasey Mountain section is adjacent to the south terminus of the Fish Springs Range, also on a north–south trendline.
