= Fountain Green Hydroelectric Plant Historic District =

- U.S. National Register of Historic Places
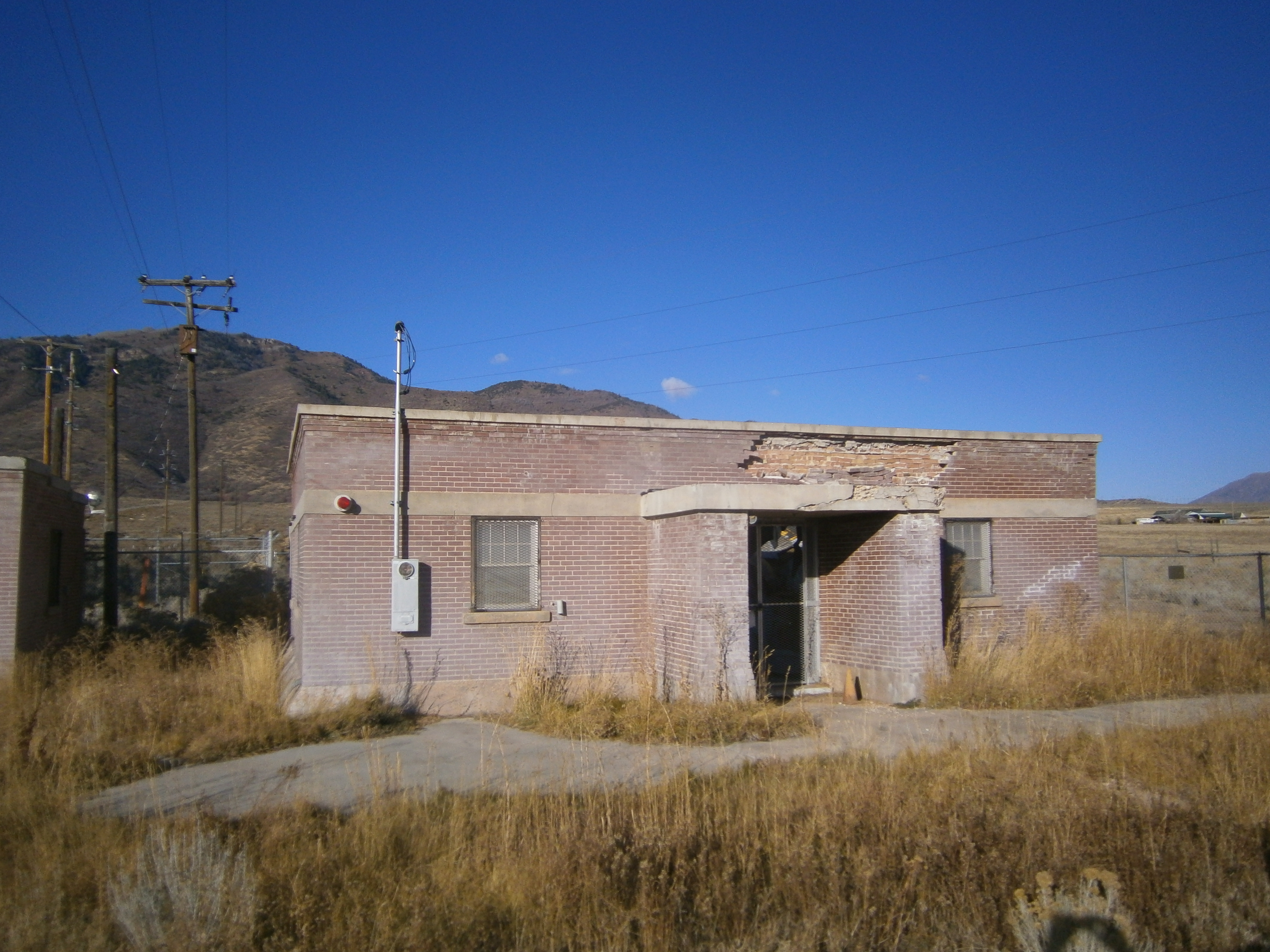
- Powerhouse in 2019

- Location within Utah Location within the United States
- Nearest city: Fountain Green, Utah
- Coordinates: 39°38′13″N 111°39′03″W
- Area: 1.6 acres (0.65 ha)
- Built: 1922
- Architectural style: Modern Movement
- MPS: Electric Power Plants of Utah MPS
- NRHP reference No.: 89000277
- Added to NRHP: April 20, 1989

Fountain Green Hydroelectric Plant Historic District, located northwest of Fountain Green, Utah, was listed on the National Register of Historic Places in 1989. The listing included three contributing buildings and a contributing structure.

== Description ==
The Fountain Green Power Plant was built 1922-23 out on flat land below the foothills of the San Pitch Mountains. Unlike hydroelectric plants powered by water from mountain streams, it used water from Big Springs, which collected behind an earthen dam and was transported by a conduit pipe to the Fountain Green powerhouse. The powerhouse is a relatively small structure holding only two turbine units. It has a simple architectural style containing elements of Art Moderne. Two ancillary smaller brick buildings are close by; in 1988 one was in use as a garage and battery house, the other as storage. The plant is located by the intersection of Big Spring Road (or N. 500 West Street) with the driveway to the Fountain Green Fish Hatchery, on the northwest side of Fountain Green. The power plant was decommissioned in 2014.

The 1.6 acres (0.65 ha) listed area of the historic district was split between two discontiguous pieces. The western piece, the earthen dam at Big Springs reservoir, at 39.636224°N 111.672859°W, was destroyed in 2017 to improve the fish hatchery. The Fountain Green Power Plant buildings are the eastern piece, at 39°38′13″N 111°39′03″W. The conduit pipe from the dam down to the power plant was deemed non-contributing, and not included in the listing.

Big Springs Electric Company; Fountain Green Hydro

"Utah Division of Wildlife Resources Fountain Green Fish Hatchery. Water leaving the powerhouse is diverted into the fish ponds. A county road from Fountain Green provides access to both the power plant site and fish hatchery. Unlike hydroelectric plants powered by water from mountain streams, the Fountain Green unit operates on water from Big Springs, a major water source about one and a half miles west of Fountain Green. There, water pours from a canyon wall, is captured by a small, earthen dam and diverted into a steel conduit which carries the water to the powerhouse. The plant site is not located at the mouth of a canyon, but lies in an open pasture some miles distant from the mountains. Although the plant site has a small front yard, there are few shade trees and landscaping details. About one quarter mile northwest of the plant is the foundation of the original Big Springs Electric Company hydroelectric plant. Built in 1902, this facility also used water from Big Springs. The dam at Big Springs may have also served this original hydroelectric plant, although the dam was probably rebuilt in 1922 at the time the Fountain Green facility was constructed."

Architecture: Modern Movement Historic function: Industry/processing/extraction Historic subfunction: Energy Facility Criteria: event, architecture/engineering

== See also ==
- National Register of Historic Places listings in Sanpete County, Utah
