= Mahogany Mountains =

Mountain range on Nevada–Utah border in the United States

- Location within Nevada

Highest point
- Peak: Mahogany Peak (Lincoln County)
- Elevation: 8,665 ft (2,641 m)

Geography
- Country: United States
- State(s): Nevada & Utah
- District(s): Lincoln County & Iron County
- Range coordinates: 37°57′43.864″N 114°4′30.917″W
- Topo map: USGS Deer Lodge Canyon

The Mahogany Mountains are a mountain range located on the Nevada–Utah border, located in Lincoln County, Nevada, and Iron County, Utah.

== Description ==
The range highpoint is Mahogany Peak (Lincoln County) located center-northwest, and about 8,665 ft (2,641 m) in height. The Needle Mountains (Nevada–Utah) are attached north, and both ranges lie attached to the south terminus of the White Rock Mountains of Nevada.

== See also ==
- List of mountain ranges of Nevada
- List of mountain ranges of Utah
