= Bear River Range =

Part of the greater Wasatch Range of Utah and Idaho

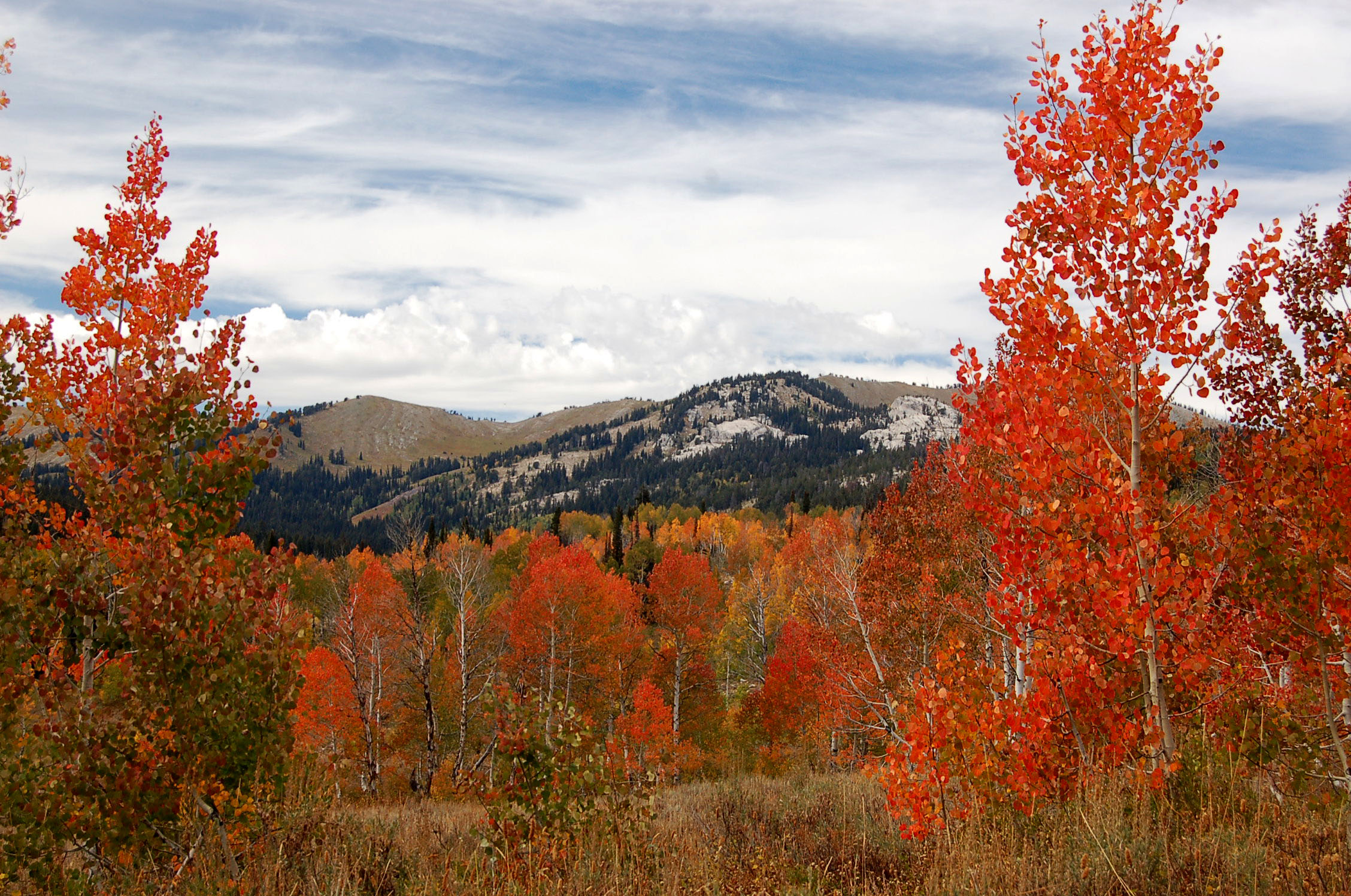
- Autumn aspens in the Bear River Range

Highest point
- Peak: Naomi Peak, Cache County, Utah & Mount Naomi Wilderness
- Elevation: 9,979 ft (3,042 m)
- Coordinates: 41°54′41.04″N 111°40′28.92″W

Dimensions
- Area: 1,615 mi^{2} (4,180 km^{2})

Naming
- Etymology: Bear River

Geography
- Country: United States
- States: Utah; Idaho
- Range coordinates: 42°8′N 111°37′W
- Parent range: Wasatch Range
- Borders on: Cache Valley; Bear Lake; Monte Cristo Range

The Bear River Range (also known as the Bear River Mountains) is a mountain range located in northeastern Utah and southeastern Idaho in the western United States.

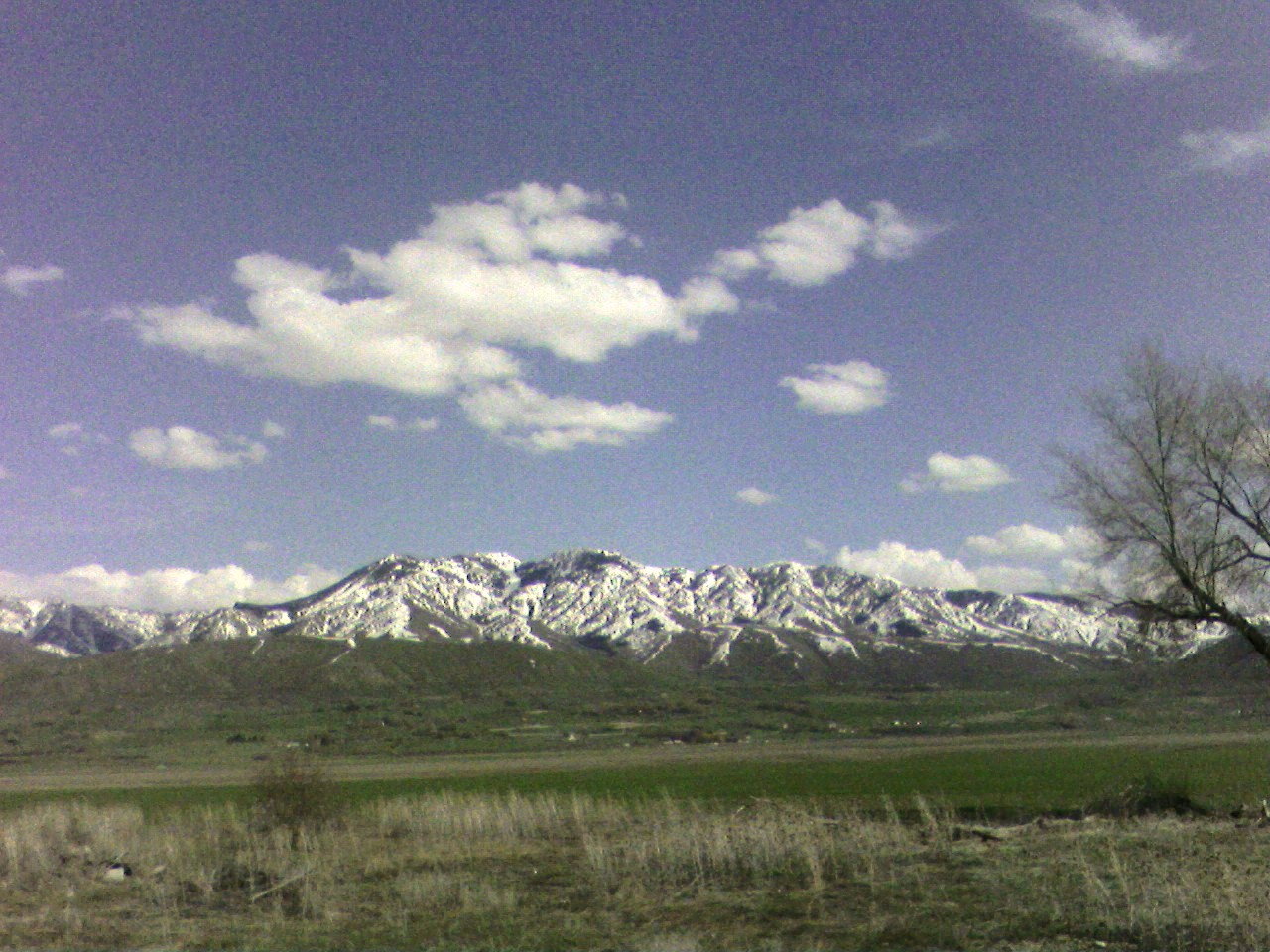
Bear River Range, Utah, May 2008

== Description ==
The range forms the eastern boundary of the Cache Valley. One of the mountains' sinks (Peter Sinks) recorded the lowest temperature in Utah on February 1, 1985, at −69 °F (−56 °C) which is also the second-lowest temperature ever recorded in the contiguous United States. U.S. Highway 89 via Logan Canyon provides the only major route through the mountains, and the canyon is the location of Logan River, the Beaver Mountain ski resort, and Tony Grove Lake.

== See also ==
- List of mountain ranges of Utah
- List of mountains in Utah
- List of mountains of Idaho
- List of mountain peaks of Idaho
- List of mountain ranges in Idaho
