= Monte Cristo Range (Utah) =

Mountain range in Cache, Rich, and Weber counties in Utah, United States

- Location within Utah

Highest point
- Peak: Mount McKinnon, (south terminus)-Monte Cristo Range
- Elevation: 9,081 ft (2,768 m)
- Listing: Mountains of Utah
- Coordinates: 41°27′07″N 111°30′18″W

Dimensions
- Length: 30 mi (48 km) SSW x NNE

Geography
- Country: United States
- State: Utah
- Counties: Cache, Rich and Weber
- Settlements: Randolph and Laketown
- Range coordinates: 41°35.11′N 111°30.05′W
- Borders on: Bear River Range, Ant Valley, Bear Lake, Bear River and Crawford Mountains

Monte Cristo Range is a mountain range in Cache, Rich, and Weber counties in Utah, United States, that is a subrange of the Wasatch Range and is a 30 miles (48 km) long mountain range in the extreme northeast of the state. It parallels the Bear River Mountains to the west, but is only about half its length.

The range trends north-northeast and also parallels a north-flowing stretch of the Bear River, with Woodruff, Randolph, and Sage Creek Junction on the river's west bank and bordering the eastern Monte Cristo Range foothills.

At the range's center-northwest foothills, in the north of Ant Valley, is the Hardware Ranch Wildlife Management Area. The main, north-northeasterly ridgeline, forms the county boundaries between Cache County (west) and Rich County (east).

== Range description ==
The Monte Cristo Range is only about 30 miles (48 km) long, but its ridge line is west of center, and there are extensive foothills eastward toward the Bear River valley river course. Ant Valley is at its western foothills bordering the Bear River Range, west, and covers about half of the western foothills, from north of the foothills center, and south, to about half of the southwest foothills.

Some of the larger peaks of the range are Red Spur Mountain at 8,872 feet (2,704 m), north of range center. Gold Hill, at 8,106 feet (2,471 m), is west of the range center. Eccles Peak at 9,062 feet (2,762 m) is in the extreme southeast; southwest of Eccles Peak, is the range high point, at the southern terminus of the range, Mt McKinnon at 9,081 feet (2,768 m).

== Access ==
Utah State Route 101 traverses the Bear River Range from Hyrum and accesses the center-west region of the range in Ant Valley, at the Hardware Ranche WMA. Ant Flat Road meets Utah 101, and traverses the southwest of the range, intersecting with Utah State Route 39 (SR-39), which traverses a south region of the range. SR-39 turns northeasterly at the southeast foothills and heads to Woodruff, about 18 miles (29 km) from the range.

== See also ==
- List of mountain ranges of Utah
