= Shivwits, Utah =

Unincorporated community in Utah, United States

- Unincorporated community
- Location of Shivwits within the State of Utah Shivwits (the United States)
- Coordinates: 37°10′52″N 113°45′27″W
- Country: United States
- State: Utah
- County: Washington
- Elevation: 3,202 ft (976 m)
- Time zone: UTC-7 (Mountain (MST))
  - Summer (DST): UTC-6 (MDT)
- GNIS feature ID: 1437683

Shivwits is an unincorporated community in west-central Washington County, Utah, United States. It is occupied by the Shivwits Band of Paiutes.

== Description ==
The community is located along the Santa Clara River and the former routing of U.S. Route 91 within the Shivwits Reservation, northeast of the Beaver Dam Mountains and southwest of the Red Mountains.
