= Wellsville Mountains =

Mountain range in Box Elder and Cache counties in Utah, United States

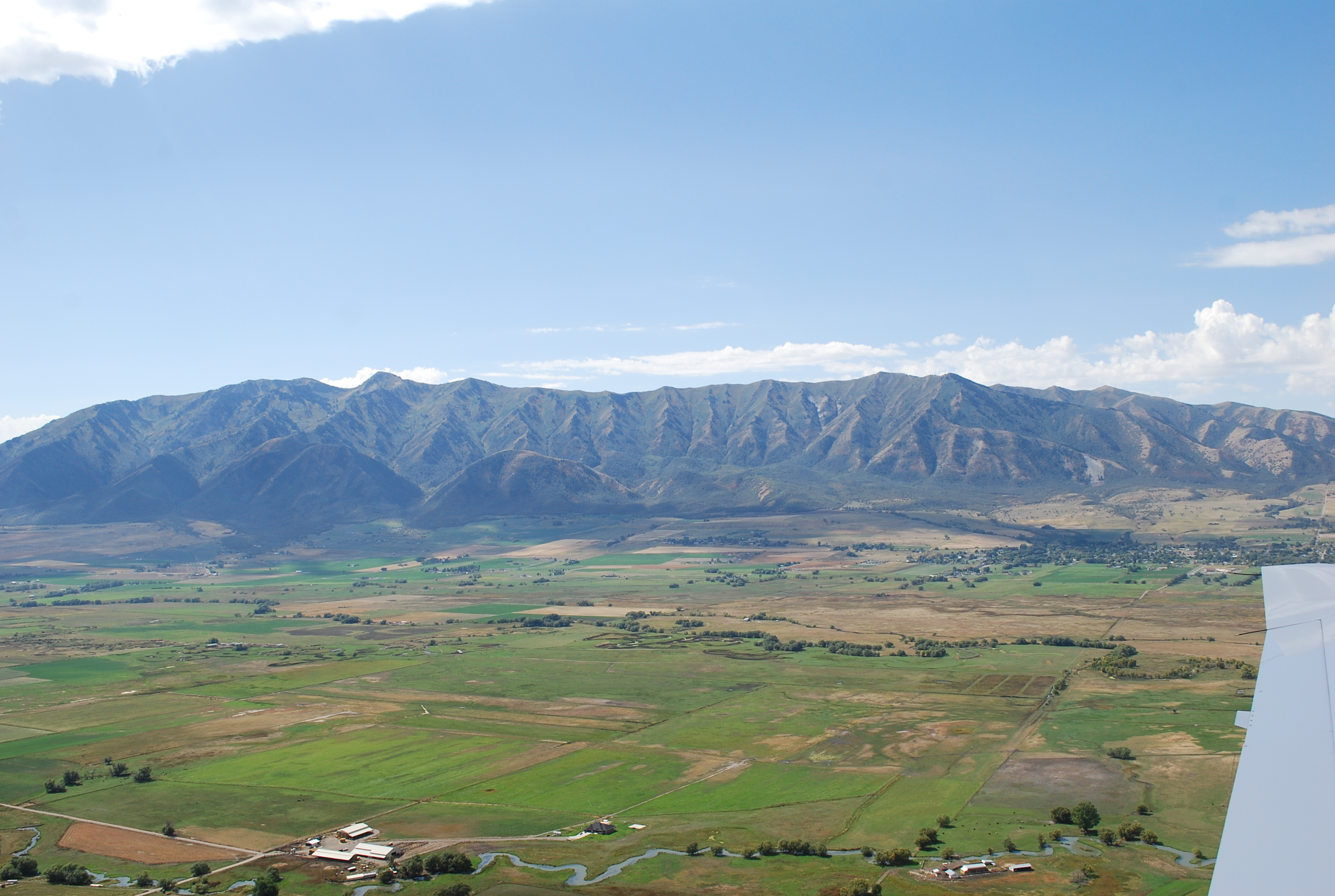
- The Wellsville Mountains as seen from the air in mid-September. Box Elder peak and the Wellsville cone are both visible, September 2009.

Highest point
- Peak: Box Elder Peak
- Elevation: 9,372 ft (2,857 m)
- Coordinates: 41°38′08″N 112°00′52″W

Dimensions
- Length: 28 mi (45 km) N/S
- Width: 17 mi (27 km) E/W
- Area: 307 mi^{2} (800 km^{2})

Naming
- Etymology: Nearby City of Wellsville

Geography
- Location within Utah Location within the United States
- Country: United States
- State: Utah
- Parent range: Wasatch Range

The Wellsville Mountains are a mountain range in Box Elder and Cache counties in Utah, United States, that is part of the Wasatch Range.

== Description ==
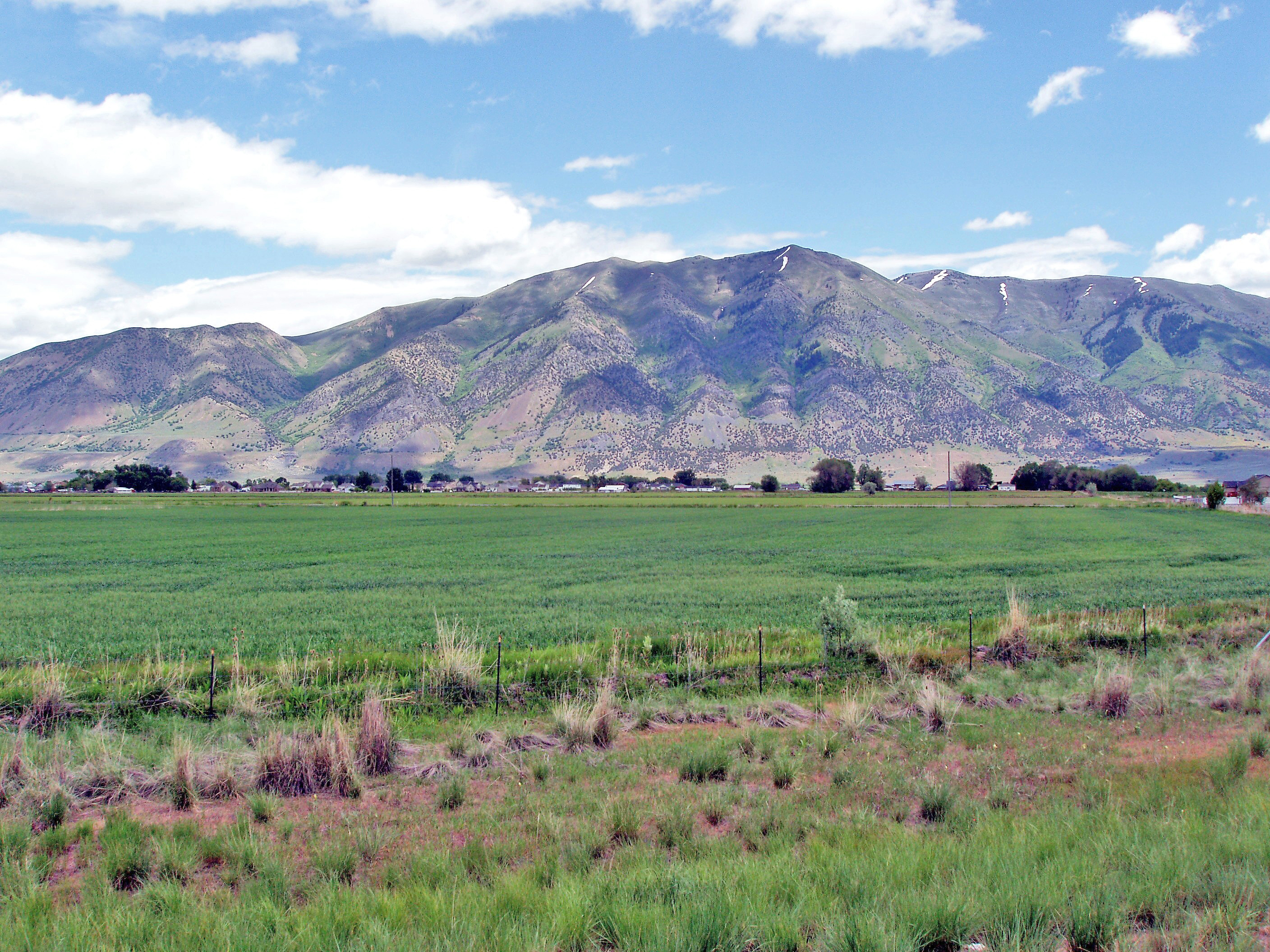
North Wellsville Mountains from west, at Elwood, Utah with Mendon Peak, June 2008

The range separates the Cache Valley from the Wasatch Front (Bear River Valley), as well as form a portion of the border between Box Elder and Cache counties. Nearly all of the water collected by the Wellsville Mountains drains into the Bear River.

While only moderately tall, they are particularly narrow. For this reason, it is often claimed they are one of the steepest mountain ranges in North America. Box Elder (9,372 feet [2,857 m]) and the Wellsville Cone (9,356 feet [2,852 m]) are its two highest peaks. US-89/US-91 traverses Box Elder Canyon, Dry Canyon, and Wellsville Canyon, beginning east of Brigham City as a four-lane highway, curving north then northeast and entering Cache Valley at Wellsville.

The mountains were named for the nearby City of Wellsville.

== See also ==
- List of mountain ranges of Utah
- Wasatch-Cache National Forest
