= San Pitch Mountains =

Mountain range in Utah, United States

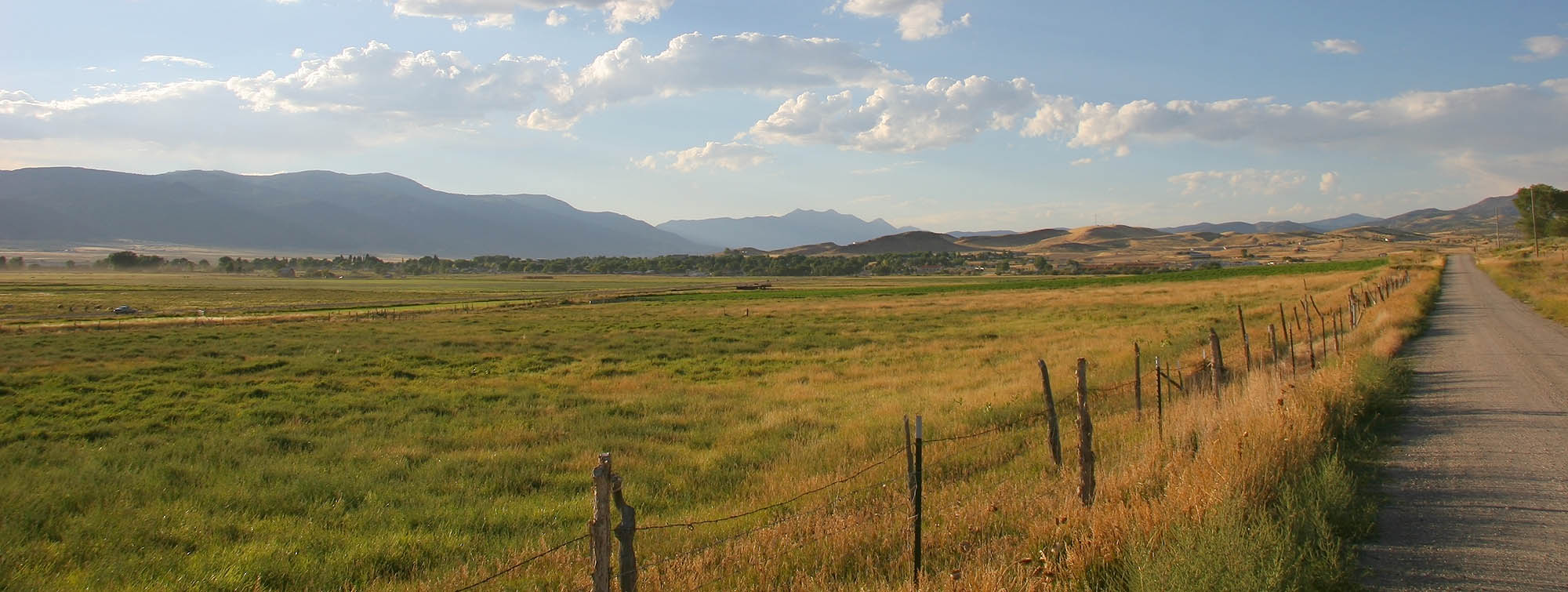
- View NW toward Moroni, Utah. North section of San Pitch Mountains on left of photo.

Highest point
- Peak: Salt Creek Peak, (north terminus)-San Pitch Mountains
- Elevation: 9,997 ft (3,047 m)

Dimensions
- Length: 40 mi (64 km) N-S

Geography
- Location within Utah Location within the United States
- Country: United States
- State: Utah
- Counties: Juab and Sanpete
- Range coordinates: 39°23′28″N 111°45′06″W
- Borders on: Juab Valley, East Tintic Mountains, Wasatch Range, Sanpete Valley, Wasatch Plateau, Sevier River and Valley Mountains

The San Pitch Mountains are a 40-mile (64 km) long mountain range located in Juab and Sanpete counties in central Utah, United States.

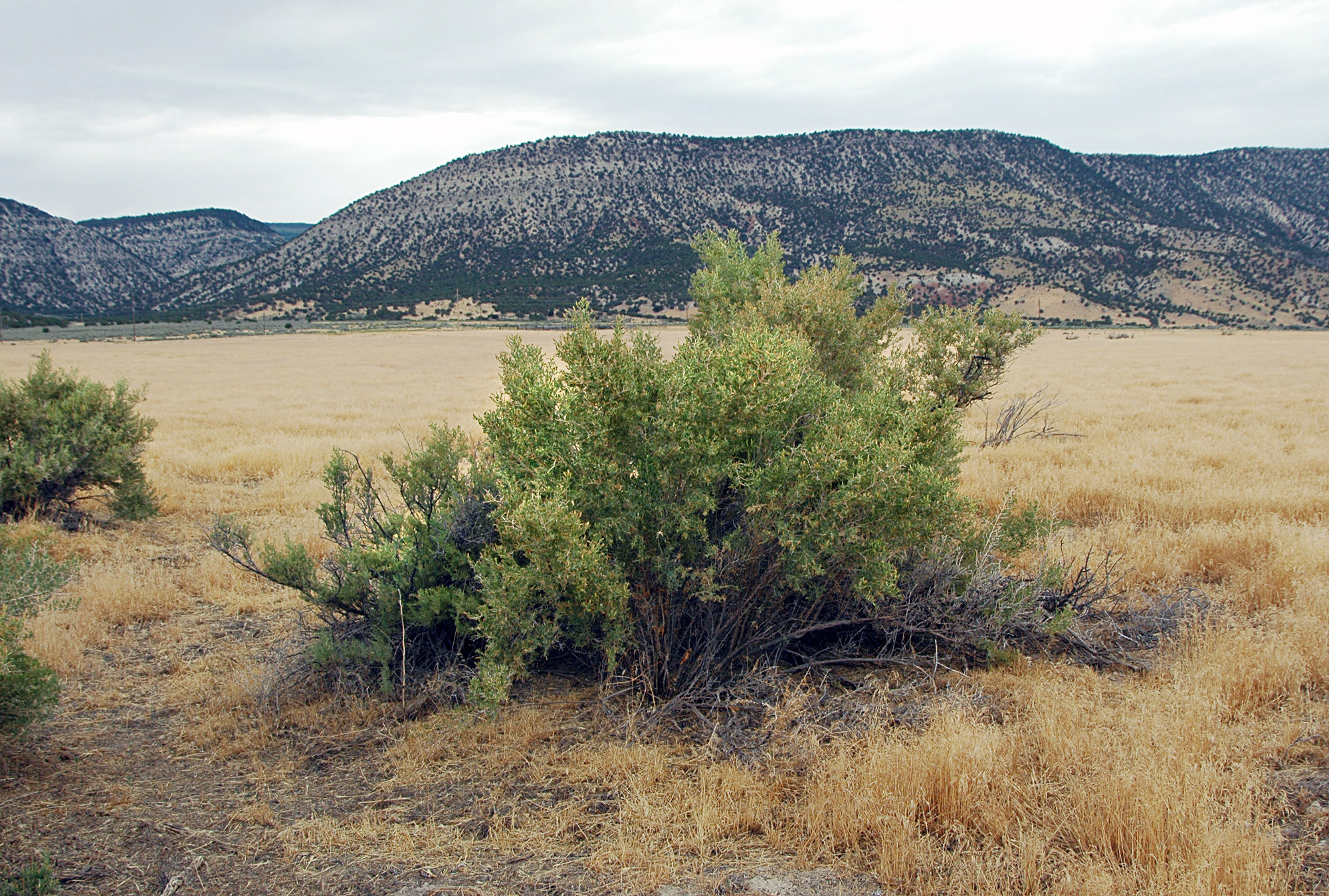
View of the Sanpitch Mountains from the west side of the Sanpete Valley.

== Description ==
The range's southwest lies adjacent a north-flowing stretch of the Sevier River, as it transitions north, northwest, west, and then southwest into the Sevier Desert. The river traverses around the adjacent mountain ranges of the Valley and Canyon Mountains.

The range is north-south trending and located between the Juab Valley west and the Sanpete Valley east. Yuba State Park is in the south of Juab Valley and borders the range's southwest, on the Sevier River.

The San Pitch Mountains are the location of Maple Canyon, which along with adjoining Box Canyon is an internationally famous rock climbing area, due to the composition of the rock walls being a conglomerate, with hundreds of routes of widely varying difficulty.

== Mountain peaks ==
The highpoint of the range is Salt Creek Peak, 9,997 feet (3,047 m), located at the north terminus of the range, and close to the Wasatch Range. The center of the range lies between Big Baldy, 8,775 feet (2,675 m) southeasterly, and Little Red Hill, 6,836 feet (2,084 m), at center-northwest.

== Access ==
The west mountain perimeter is traversed by Utah Route 28 through Levan. The east side of the range through Sanpete Valley is traversed by Utah Route 132 and U.S. 89.

== See also ==
- List of mountain ranges of Utah
