= Central, Utah =

- Census-designated place
- Location of Central within Washington County and the State of Utah
- Coordinates: 37°24′54″N 113°37′27″W
- Country: United States
- State: Utah
- County: Washington
- Incorporated: 1935 (as a town)
- Disincorporated: 1960s
- Elevation: 5,216 ft (1,590 m)

Population (2020)
  - Total: 656
- Time zone: UTC-7 (Mountain (MST))
  - Summer (DST): UTC-6 (MDT)
- ZIP code: 84722
- Area code: 435
- GNIS feature ID: 2629947

Central is a census-designated place in north-central Washington County, Utah, United States. The population was 656 at the 2020 census. Central lies along State Route 18, on the edge of the Dixie National Forest, north of the city of St. George (the county seat of Washington County).

== History ==
Central was settled before 1910. It became an incorporated town in 1935, but was disincorporated in the 1960s. The town was so named because of its central location between Enterprise, and Veyo.

== Demographics ==
Historical population
Census	Pop.	Note	%±
1910	110		—
1920	121		10.0%
1930	74		−38.8%
1940	70		−5.4%
1950	49		−30.0%
1960	21		−57.1%
1970	32		52.4%
2010	613		—
2020	656		7.0%
Source: U.S. Census Bureau

As of the census of 2010, there were 613 people living in the CDP. There were 344 housing units. The racial makeup of the town was 96.1% White, 0.5% American Indian and Alaska Native, 0.8% Asian, 1.8% from some other race, and 0.8% from two or more races. Hispanic or Latino of any race were 3.6% of the population.

== Government ==
Central has the ZIP code of 84722.

== Events ==
Central is the starting place of the annual St. George Marathon.

== See also ==
- List of census-designated places in Utah
- Mountain Meadows Massacre
