= House Range =

Mountain range in Millard County, Utah, USA

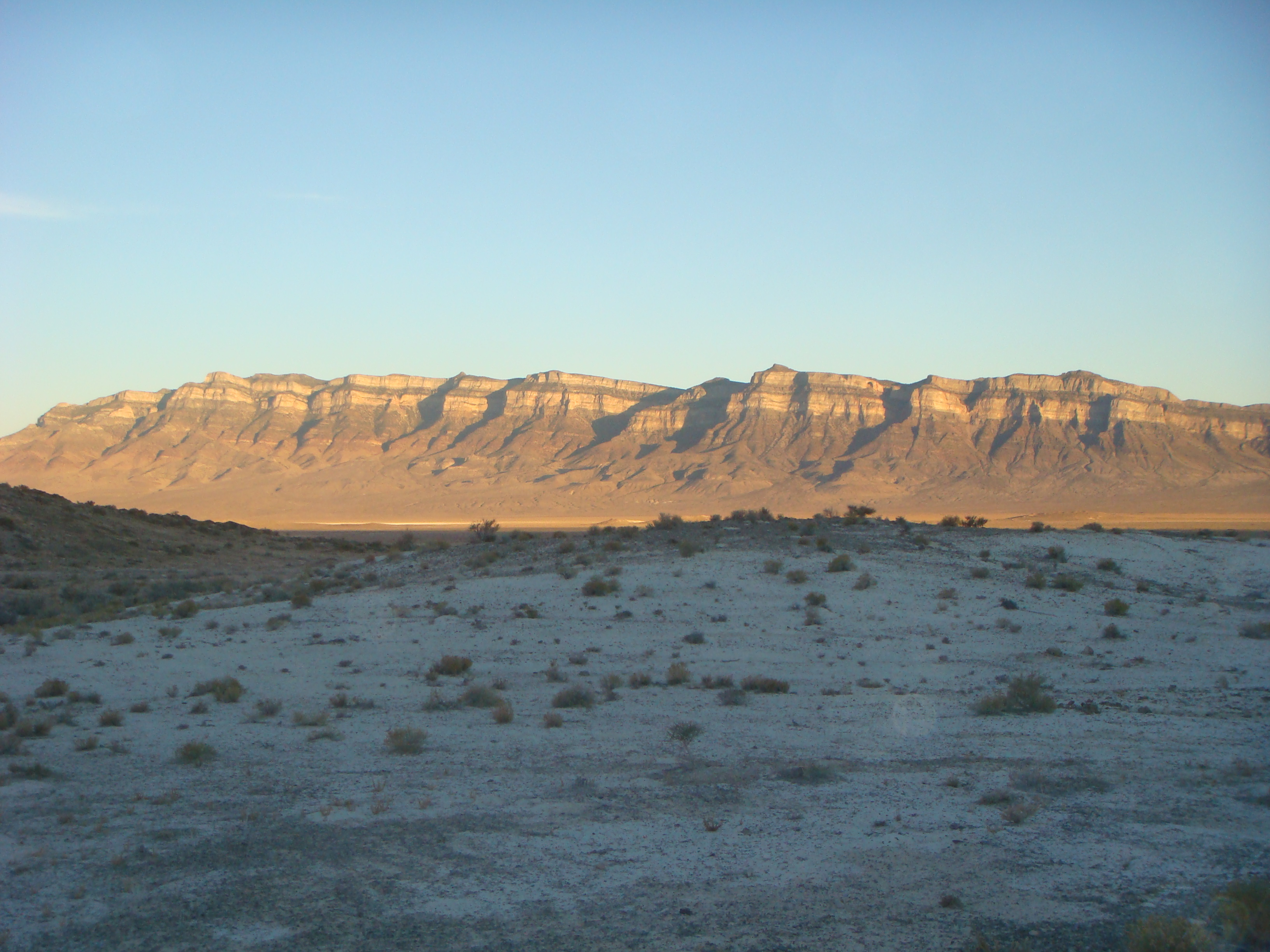
- Northern part of the House Range at sunset-(Swasey Mountain section), showing the stratigraphy

Highest point
- Peak: Swasey Peak
- Elevation: 9,669 ft (2,947 m)
- Coordinates: 39°23′17″N 113°18′59″W

Dimensions
- Length: 70 mi (110 km) N/S
- Width: 34 mi (55 km) E/W
- Area: 1,242 mi^{2} (3,220 km^{2})

Geography
- Location within Utah
- Country: United States
- State: Millard County, Utah

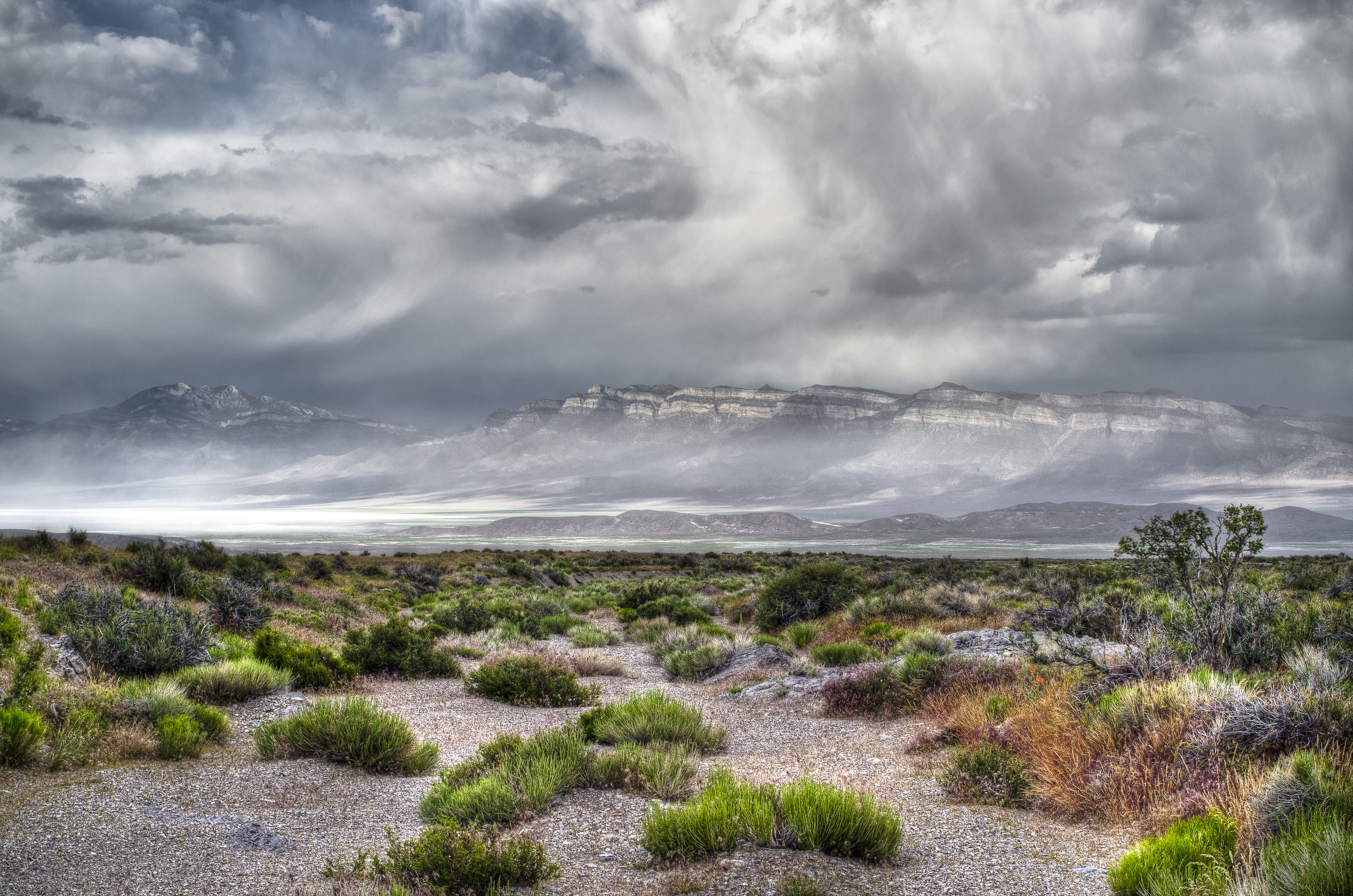
"Spring Storm in the Great Basin" — House Range and Tule Valley.

The House Range is a north-south trending mountain range in Millard County, of west-central Utah. The House Range was named in 1859 by James H. Simpson. It was named by Simpson because "...of its well-defined stratification and the resemblance of portions of its outline to domes, minarets, houses, and other structures."

== Geography ==
The House Range is bounded by Tule Valley to the west, Whirlwind Valley and Sevier Desert to the east, and trends with the Fish Springs Range to the north. The range has three notable passes: Skull Rock Pass (which US Highway 6/US Highway 50 travels through), Marjum Canyon (which the old US Highway 6 travels through), and Sand Pass (which the Weiss Highway passes through).

The highest point in the House Range is Swasey Peak, at 9,669 feet (2,947 m). Other notable peaks include Notch Peak, a frequent climbing and base-jumping hotspot, and the very square Tatow Knob.

It is also known for one of the tallest limestone cliffs in the world, Notch Peak.

== Geology ==
The geology of the House Range is dominated by gray Cambrian to Devonian carbonate rock which was intruded by a pink Jurassic granitoid in the central part of the range. In the Wheeler Amphitheater, away from the intrusion, the Lagerstätte that contains the well-preserved fauna is found in the Cambrian section of the range. Evidence of Lake Bonneville's presence is found both in shorelines and white marls at the base of the range. The main structural component to the range is a large basin-bounding fault on the west side.

== Fossils ==
The range is known for a fossil Lagerstätte (Wheeler Shale) of Cambrian age, which has an array of Burgess Shale type fauna, including Elrathia kingii, a trilobite that is one of Utah's most famous fossils.

=== Stratigraphy ===
The Swasey Limestone was deposited in the Bathyuriscus–Elrathina zone (contemporaneous with the Burgess Shale). This is overlain in turn by the Bolaspidella zone (uppermost Middle Cambrian) Wheeler Shale and Marjum Formation, then the Cedaria zone (lowermost Upper Cambrian) Weeks Formation.
