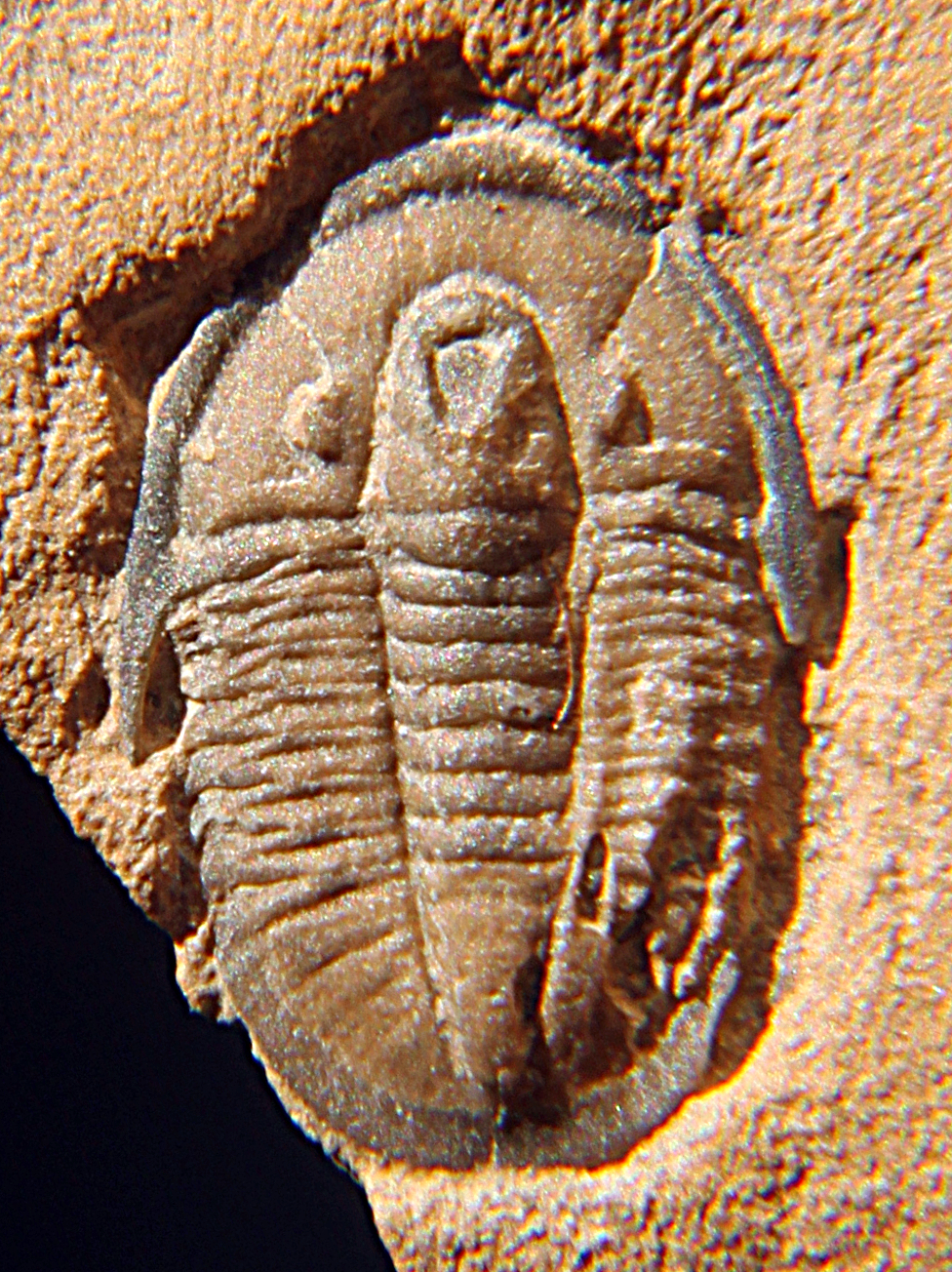
- Cedaria minor, 11 mm

Scientific classification
- Kingdom: Animalia
- Phylum: Arthropoda
- Clade: †Artiopoda
- Class: †Trilobita
- Order: †Ptychopariida
- Family: †Cedariidae
- Genus: †Cedaria; Walcott, 1924

Species
- C. prolifica Walcott, 1924 (type species); C. bella Lochman & Hu, 1962; C. brevifrons Palmer, 1960; C. cajonensis Rusconi, 1958; C. eurycheilos Palmer, 1954; C. gaspensis Rasetti, 1946; C. milleri Resser, 1937; C. minor (Walcott, 1916) = Asaphiscus minor; C. nixonia Lochman & Duncan, 1944; C. tennesseensis Walcott, 1925; C. tumicephala Robison, 1988

= Cedaria =

Cedaria Temporal range: Dresbachian

Extinct genus of trilobites

Cedaria is an extinct genus of trilobites from the late Cambrian.

It is a small, rather flat trilobite with an oval outline, a headshield and tailshield of approximately the same size, 7 articulating segments in the middle part of the body and spines at the back edges of the headshield that reach half the length of the body. Cedaria lived during the early part of the Upper Cambrian (Dresbachian), and is especially abundant in the Weeks Formation.

== Description ==
Cedaria has an ovate outline of 1 centimetre or 0.39 inches long on average (maximum size 2.5 cm) and ¾ as wide between the tips of the genal spines. The headshield (or cephalon) is parabolic in shape with a well defined wide, and typically darker colored border of about 10% of the glabellar length or equal to a thorax segment. The well-defined central raised area (or glabella) tapers slightly forward with a rounded front, but lateral furrows are weakly defined. The backward occipital ring is well defined. The distance from the glabella to the border (or preglabellar field) is approximately one-quarter the length of the glabella or twice the width of the border. The eyes are kidney-shaped, about one-quarter the length of the glabella and at its midlength, and they are positioned close to the glabella, at one-third of its width. The remaining parts of the cephalon, called fixed and free cheeks (or fixigenae and librigenae) are flat. The fracture lines (or sutures) that in moulting separate the librigenae from the fixigenae are divergent just in front of the eyes, becoming parallel near the border furrow and slightly convergent at margin. From the back of the eyes the sutures bends outward and slightly backward, curving backward at the lateral border furrow and cutting the posterior margin in the inner bend of the spine (or opisthoparian sutures). The articulating middle part of the body (or thorax) has 7 segments, the outer tips bending backwards, pointed and darker. The tailshield (or pygidium) is semicircular, straight or almost indented and has a long, low, tapering axis with 5 or 6 rings, and 4 or 5 pleural furrows. The border in the pygidium is as wide as in the cephalon and is also often darker, but the border furrow is very shallow or absent.

== Taxonomy ==
Bonneterrina, Carinamala, Cedaria, Cedarina, Paracedaria, Jimachongia and Vernaculina together comprise the family Cedariidae.

=== Reassigned species ===
- Cedaria buttsi = ?Crepicephalus
- Cedaria woosteri = ?

== Distribution ==
- Cedaria minor appears in the Upper Cambrian of the United States (between 200 m above the base of the Weeks Formation 15 m into the Big Horse Limestone Member, Orr Formation, House Range, Millard County, Utah), Canada (Rabbitkettle Formation, Mackenzie Mountains), and Greenland.
- Cedaria is also reported in the Warrior Formation in Pennsylvania.
