= Tule Valley =

Valley within the Great Basin in western Utah

- 1859: White Valley
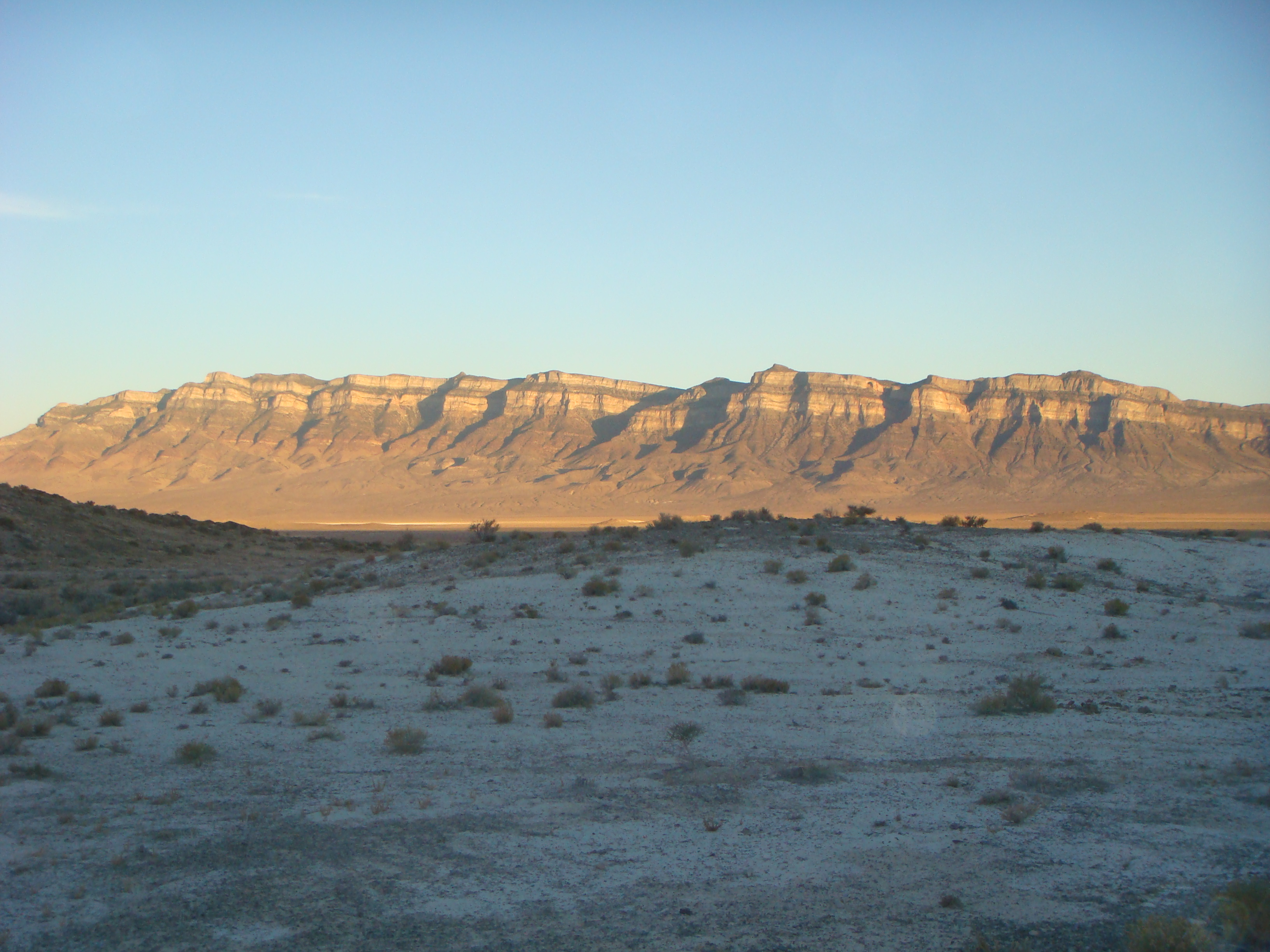
- Shadow on the eponymic white rocks of the Tule Valley, November 2009

- Location within Utah Location within the United States
- Floor elevation: 4,780 ft (1,460 m)
- Area: 248 sq mi (640 km^{2})

Geography
- Location: Millard County, Utah; United States
- Coordinates: 38°57′25″N 113°22′34″W
- Interactive map of Tule Valley

Tule Valley (also known as White Valley) is a valley in Millard County, Utah, United States.

== Description ==
The valley is a north-south trending endorheic valley within the Great Basin (geographically), Great Basin Desert (ecologically), and Basin and Range Province (tectonically) of west-central Utah. It is bounded on the west by the Confusion Range, on the east by the House Range, to the north by the Middle Range and the Great Salt Lake Desert, and the south by Wah Wah Valley and the Wah Wah Mountains. The central part of the valley has several knolls, the largest of which is Coyote Knolls. The White Valley name comes from the abundance of white rocks noted by James H. Simpson in 1859. These rocks are mostly Lake Bonneville marls in the valley floor.

== Geographic features ==
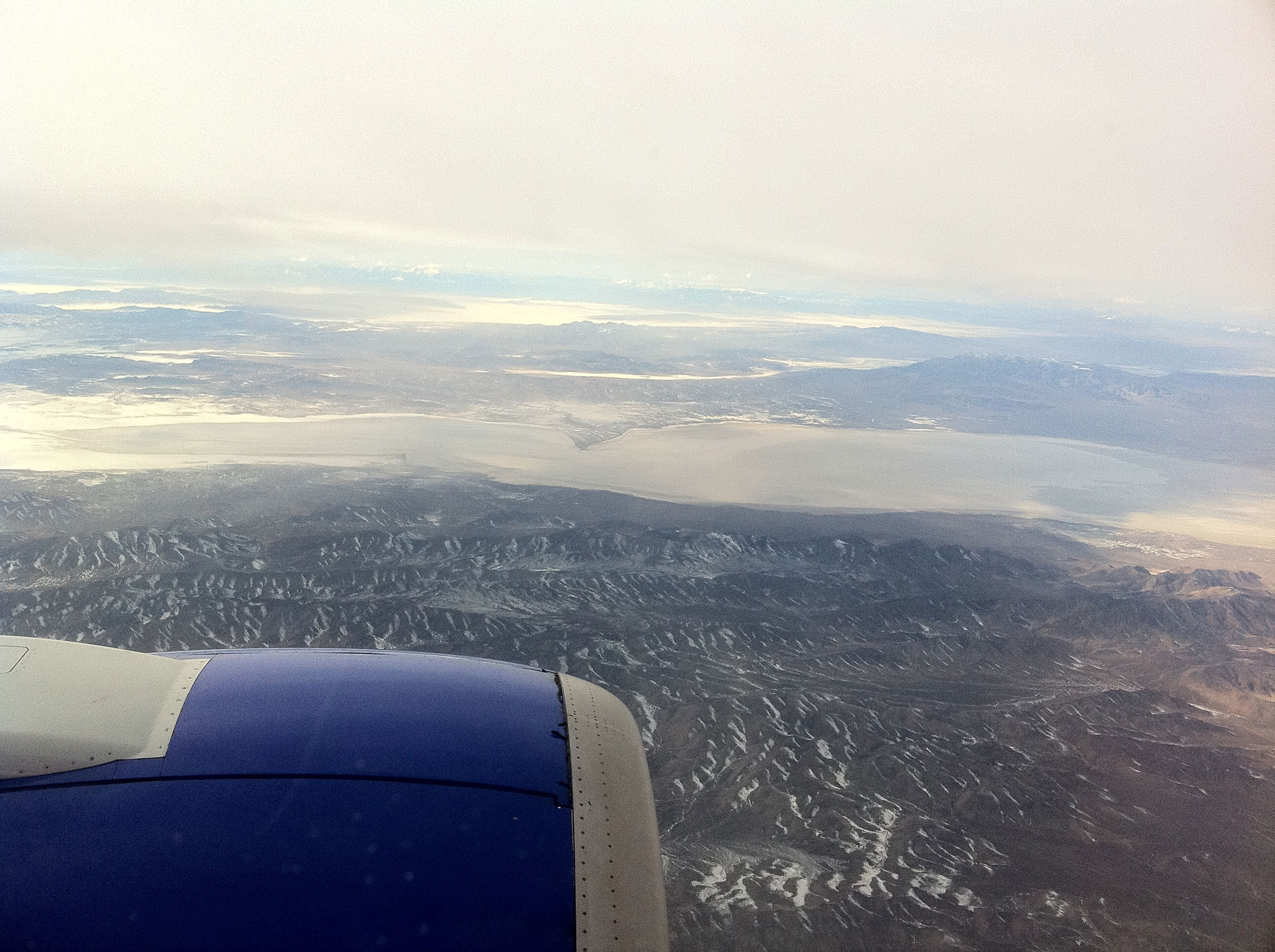
(view west, beyond Sevier Lake)-Arc-shaped south Tule Valley section, (Confusion Range to west, House Range to east); north Tule Valley, at horizon, photo right, February 2011

Tule Valley's most prominent feature may be Coyote Springs, an important spring system for local wildlife and feral horses, which populate the valley. It is also used as a gateway to viewing and traveling toward the base of Notch Peak, a 4,450-foot (1,360 m) carbonate rock cliff (2,200 feet [670 m] of which is pure vertical drop), the tallest carbonate cliff in North America. The name "Tule" is a reference to a swamp plant that probably was found at Coyote Springs during the early exploration of the valley.

The valley itself is very isolated and only has one paved road through its southern end, U.S. Route 6/U.S. Route 50. There are no permanent human residents of the valley, though shepherds are known to populate it in the spring. The center of the valley is a large playa, the place where all precipitation from the drainage basin collects, since it is an isolated basin and watershed. This is the location of the lowest point in Millard County, Utah.

The Ibex Crags offer "world class" bouldering to climbers. They are located on the eastern edge of the Great Basin.

== Geology ==
The geology of Tule Valley consists of Quaternary alluvial sediments punctuated by chalky white Pleistocene marls. The valley is a true graben in the sense that it is down-faulted by normal faults on both sides of the valley. The knolls in the valley are horsts of Silurian to Devonian carbonates.

== Tule Valley watershed ==
The Tule Valley hydrologic unit is an area of several Utah valleys and ridgelines of the Basin and Range Province. The endorheic watershed's volume of surface water averages 4,000 acre-feet (4,900,000 m^{3}).

== See also ==
- List of valleys of Utah
