= Beaver Dam Mountains =

Landform in southwest Utah and northwest Arizona

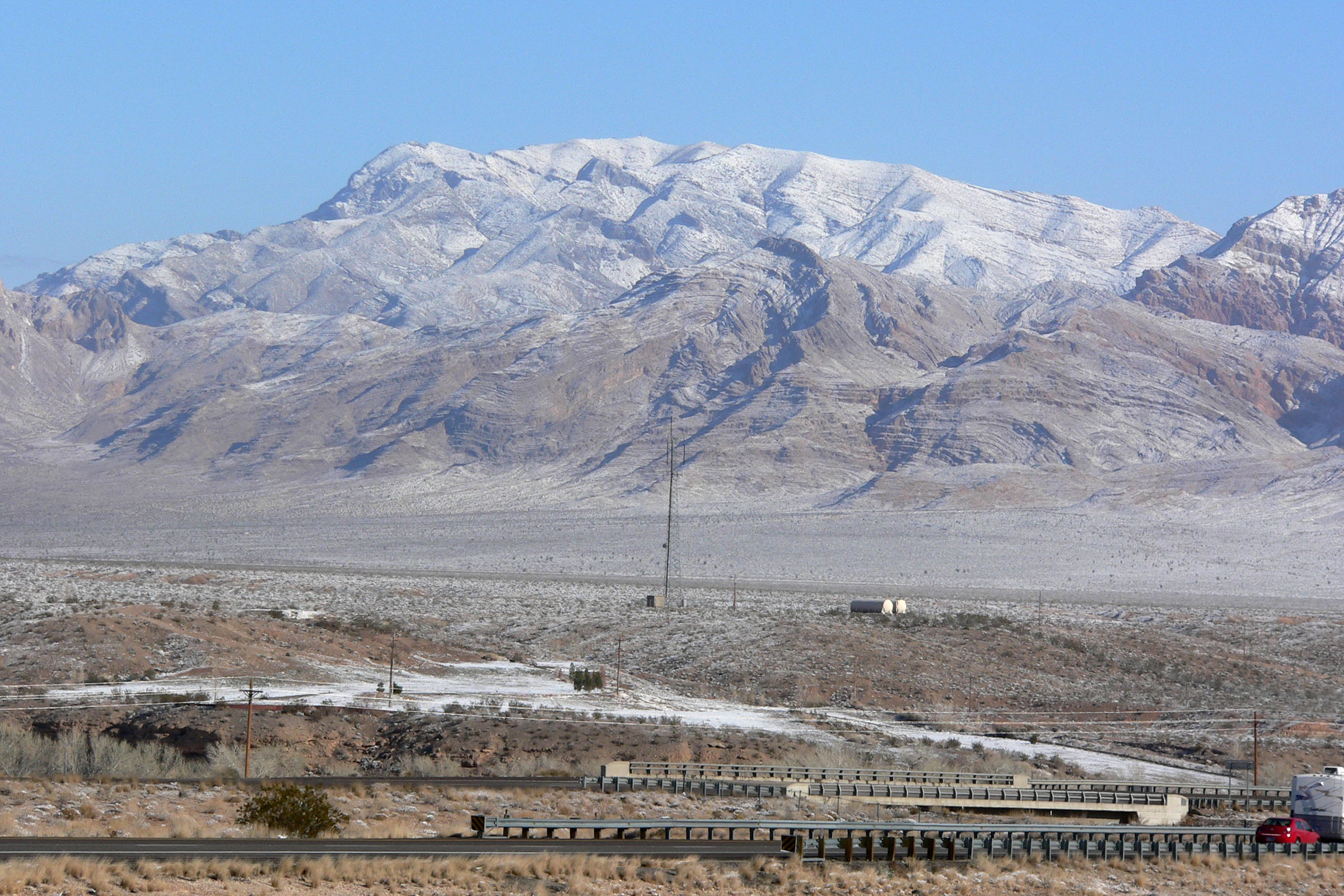
- north section massif West Mountain Peak (Washington County, UT)

Highest point
- Peak: West Mountain Peak (Washington County), (northwest)-Beaver Dam Mountains
- Elevation: 7,680 ft (2,340 m)
- Coordinates: 37°9′19″N 113°53′0″W

Dimensions
- Length: 23 mi (37 km) NNW-SSE
- Width: 13 mi (21 km)

Geography
- Location within Utah
- Country: United States
- States: Utah and Arizona
- Regions: Mojave Desert and Great Basin
- Counties: Washington and Mohave
- Rivers: Virgin River and Virgin River Gorge
- Communities: Saint George, Utah, Shivwits, Utah and Littlefield, Arizona
- Range coordinates: 37°05′09″N 113°48′19″W
- Borders on: Tule Springs Hills, Clover Mountains, Bull Valley Mountains, Red Mountains, Saint George, Virgin Mountains and Virgin Valley
- Topo map: Jarvis Peak quad

The Beaver Dam Mountains are a 23 miles (37 km) long mountain range located mostly in extreme southwest Washington County, Utah, west of St. George, with the south of the range extending into the Arizona Strip.

The range contains the Beaver Dam Mountains Wilderness which straddles the state's borders. The south of the range can be seen from Interstate 15, as it traverses the corridor into Utah through the Virgin River Gorge, as the Virgin River exits the west of the Colorado Plateau.

== Description ==
The range contains two sections. The northern massif is anchored by the highpoint (photo), of the West Mountain Peak (Washington County), 7,680 feet (2,341 m). The eastern flank of the north massif contains Shivwits, Utah in the center of a section of the Paiute Indian Tribe of Utah, the Shivwits Band of Utah. Utah highway 91 traverses the northwest–southeast sections through Utah Hill Summit.

The center of the range is adjacent to the Highway 91 mountain pass, and Tahoari (peak), 5,523 feet (1,683 m).

The mountains are the only place in Utah where Dudleya arizonica, a rare plant of the family Crassulaceae, can be found.

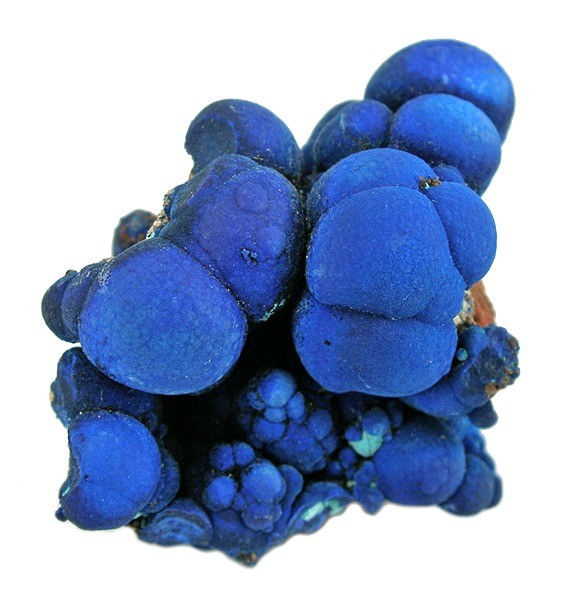
Azurite specimen from the old Apex mine near Jarvis Peak

== Access ==
The center of the range at about 4,731 ft (1,442 m), (Utah Hill Summit), can be easily accessed from the west-southwest by Highway 91, from Littlefield, Arizona. The east and southeast of the range can be accessed by routes from St. George and Interstate 15.
