= Maple Canyon (San Pitch Mountains) =

Canyon in Northeastern Utah, United States

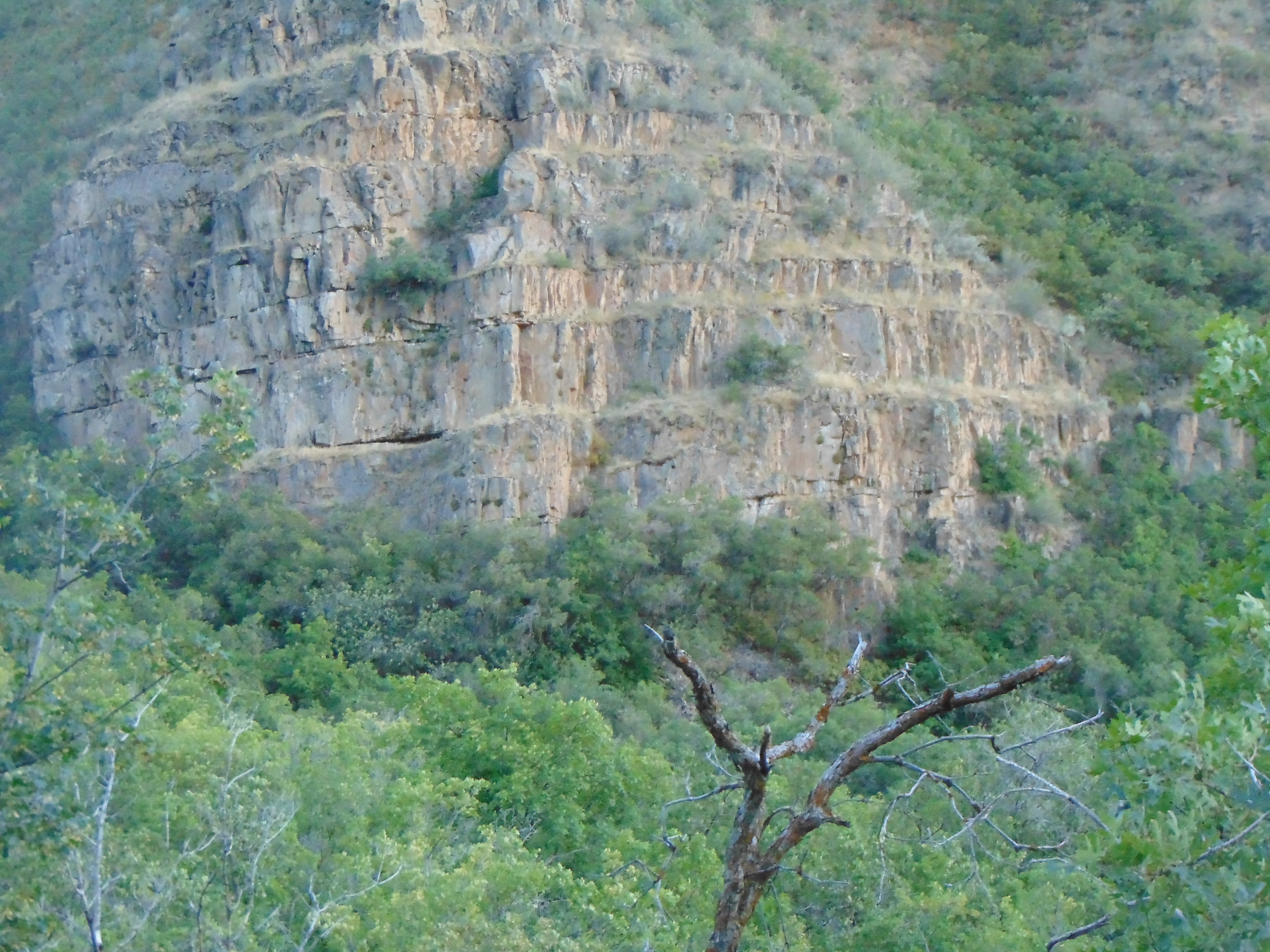
- South Canyon Wall, July 2016

- Location within Utah Location within the United States
- Elevation: 6,835 feet (2,083 m)

Third Approach
- Location: Sanpete County, Utah
- Range: San Pitch Mountains
- Coordinates: 39.5554°N 111.6777°W

Maple Canyon is a canyon in the northeastern San Pitch Mountains in northern Sanpete County, Utah, United States Nearly all of the canyon, except the western end, is located within the Uinta National Forest. The mouth of the canyon is in the northwestern Sanpete Valley, south of Fountain Green and just northwest of the unincorporated community of Freedom, at an elevation of 6,017 feet (1,834 m).

The canyon offers rock climbing, camping, hiking and general recreation. Many climbing enthusiasts visit this area and have found excellent sport climbing due to the nature of the cobblestone rock.

== See also ==
- List of canyons and gorges in Utah
