= Veyo, Utah =

- CDP
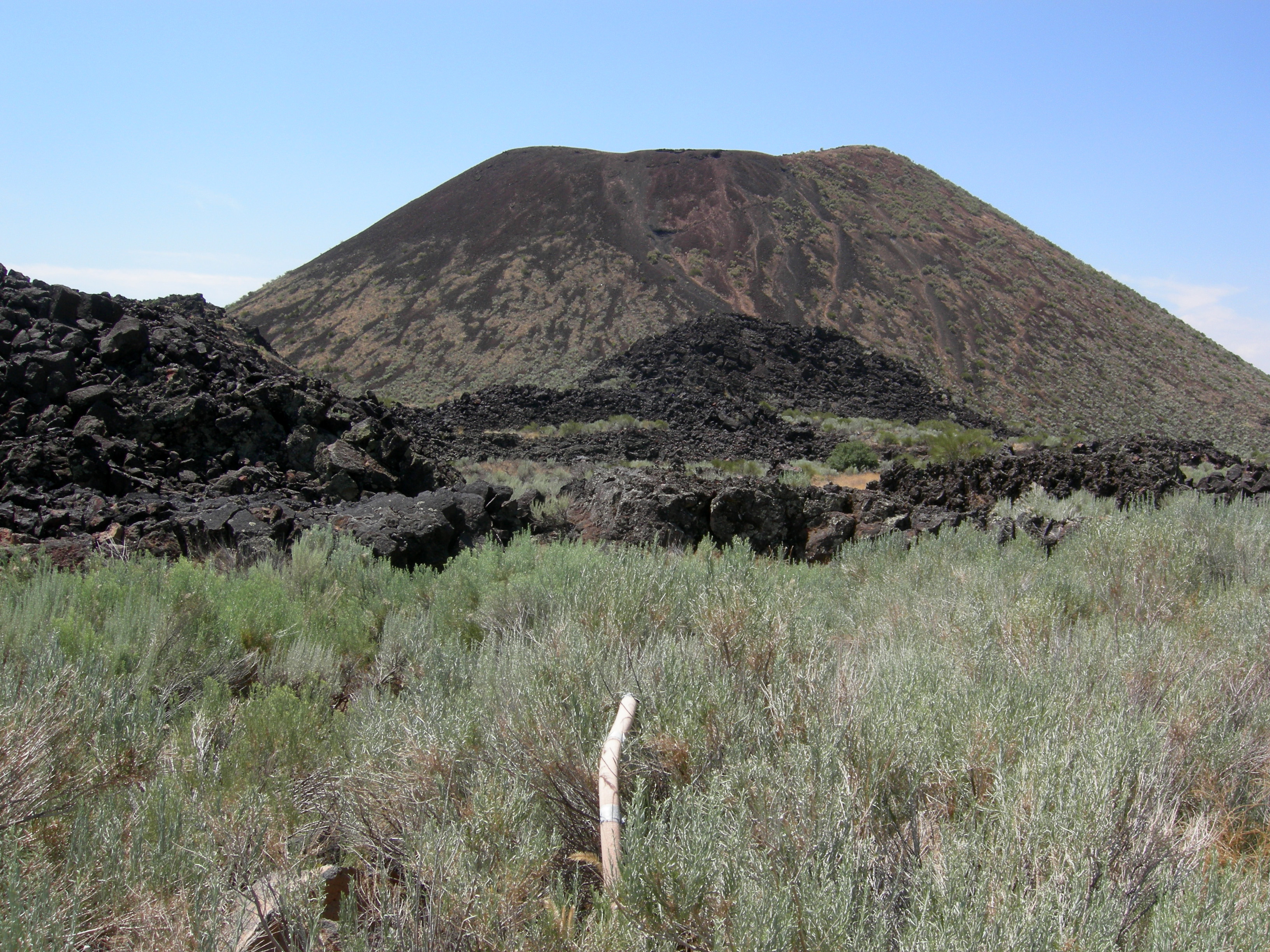
- Holocene volcano, near State Route 18 south of Veyo in 2008

- Location in Washington County and the State of Utah
- Coordinates: 37°20′34″N 113°42′12″W
- Country: United States
- State: Utah
- County: Washington
- Elevation: 4,472 ft (1,363 m)

Population (2020)
  - Total: 586
- Time zone: UTC-7 (Mountain (MST))
  - Summer (DST): UTC-6 (MDT)
- ZIP code: 84782
- Area code: 435
- GNIS feature ID: 2629956

Veyo is a census-designated place in western Washington County, Utah, United States, on the edge of the Dixie National Forest. The population was 586 at the 2020 census. The town lies along State Route 18 north of the city of St. George.

== History ==
Veyo became a distinct community from Gunlock in 1918. One tradition says the community name is an acronym of virtue, enterprise, youth, and order; another says it combines verdure and youth. There is a town of Veyo in Spain that is also referred to as La Peña, which means "rocky outcrop".

== Geography ==
The elevation of Veyo is 4,485 feet (1,367 m).

=== Climate ===
According to the Köppen Climate Classification system, Veyo has a semi-arid climate, abbreviated "BSk" on climate maps.

== Demographics ==
Historical population
Census	Pop.	Note	%±
1920	79		—
1930	167		111.4%
1940	114		−31.7%
1950	84		−26.3%
2010	483		—
2020	586		21.3%
Source: U.S. Census Bureau

As of the census of 2010, there were 483 people living in the CDP. There were 193 housing units. The racial makeup of the town was 94.6% White, 0.8% American Indian and Alaska Native, 0.4% Asian, 0.2% Native Hawaiian and Other Pacific Islander, 2.3% from some other race, and 1.7% from two or more races. Hispanic or Latino of any race were 5.2% of the population.

== Government ==
Although Veyo is unincorporated, it has a post office with the ZIP code of 84782.

== See also ==
- List of census-designated places in Utah
