= Yuba State Park =

State park in Utah, United States

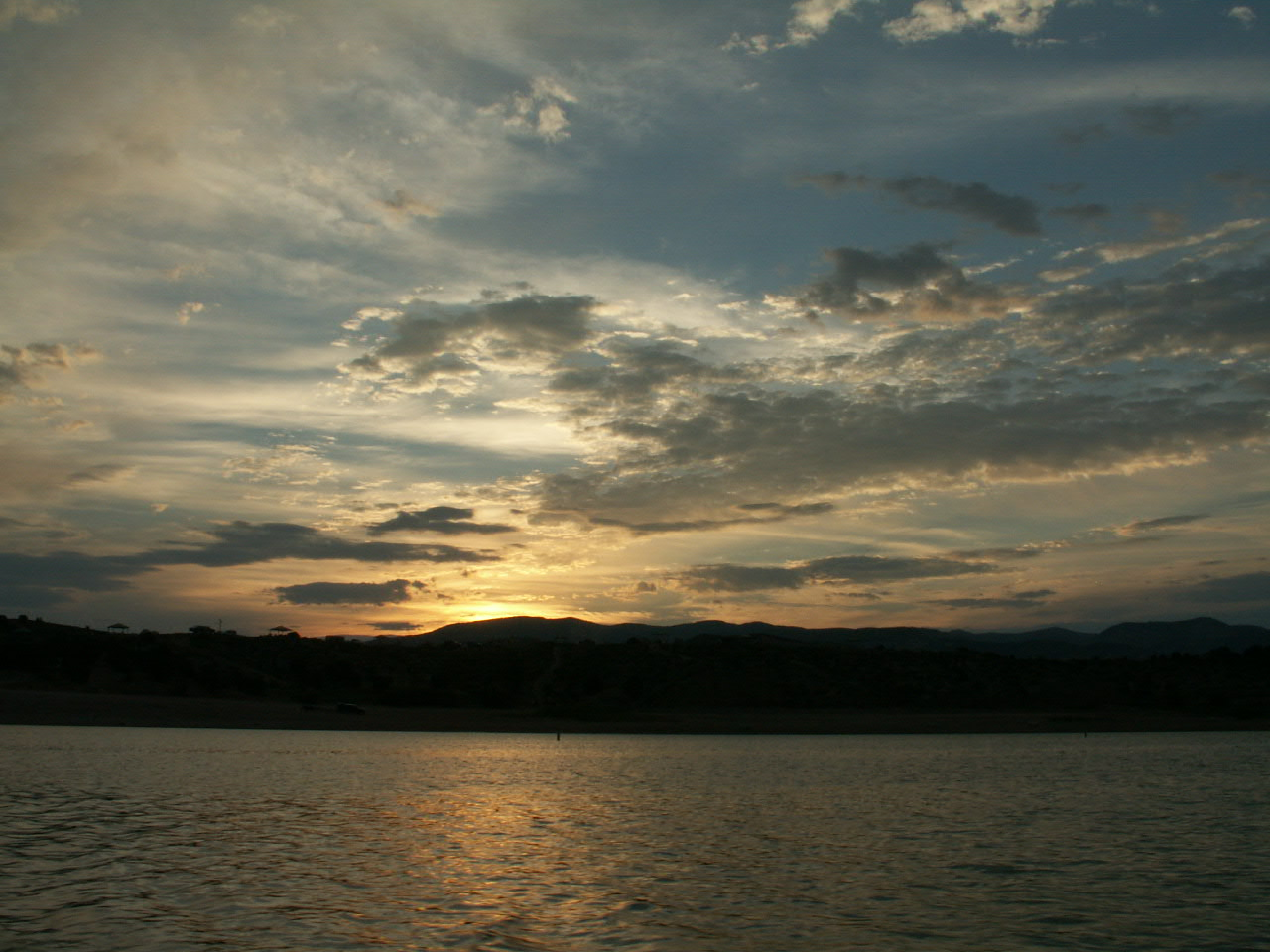
- Sunrise at Yuba State Park, July 2008

- Location within Utah
- Interactive map of Yuba State Park
- Location: Juab and Sanpete counties, Utah, United States
- Coordinates: 39°22′44″N 112°1′39″W
- Area: 15,940 acres (6,450 ha) [Yuba Special Recreation Management Area]
- Elevation: 5,100 ft (1,600 m)
- Established: February 15, 1964
- Opened: 1970
- Administrator: Utah State Parks
- Visitors: 182,499 (in 2025)
- Website: Official website
- Utah State Parks

Yuba State Park is a state park on the Sevier Bridge Reservoir (also known as Yuba Reservoir) in Juab and Sanpete counties in central Utah, United States. The park is located approximately 25 miles (40 km) south of Nephi. Recreational opportunities include camping, boating, swimming, fishing, and nearby off highway vehicle riding.

== History ==
Yuba State Park got its name from the individuals who built the dam. Local farmers and ranchers had to build the dam themselves or risk losing their water rights. The men working on the structure called it the U.B. Dam. As they worked they sang a song that stated they were damned if they worked and damned if they didn't. The phonetic sound of the reservoir's name was eventually spelled Yuba.

== See also ==
- List of Utah State Parks
