= Drum Mountains =

Mountain range in Utah, United States

- Location within Utah

Highest point
- Peak: Lady Laird Peak
- Elevation: 6,982 ft (2,128 m)
- Coordinates: 39°33′45″N 113°02′54″W

Geography
- Country: United States
- State(s): Juab and Millard counties, Utah

The Drum Mountains or Detroit Mountains are a desert range in Juab and Millard counties of western Utah. They lie within the Basin and Range Province, which is a series of generally north-south trending mountain ranges and valleys (or basins) extending from central Utah to eastern California, and from southern Idaho into Sonora, Mexico.

== Geology ==
During the Cambrian period, this area was underwater, which produced the marine sediments (limestones and shales) seen today in outcrop. The formations from this time are generally deeper water deposits (ramp-to-basin and outer-shelf). The Drum Mountains are complete (meaning there are no missing gaps in time) and are generally undisturbed. This is the reason why the beginning of the Drumian stage of the geologic time scale was defined here.
