= Gunlock, Utah =

Unincorporated community in the state of Utah, United States

- Unincorporated community
- Location of Gunlock within the State of Utah Gunlock (the United States)
- Coordinates: 37°17′10″N 113°45′48″W
- Country: United States
- State: Utah
- County: Washington
- Settled: 1857
- Named after: William "Gunlock" Hamblin
- Elevation: 3,648 ft (1,112 m)
- Time zone: UTC-7 (Mountain (MST))
  - Summer (DST): UTC-6 (MDT)
- ZIP codes: 84733
- GNIS feature ID: 1437576

Gunlock is an unincorporated community in western Washington County, Utah, United States, north of Gunlock State Park.

== Description ==
The community lies on the Santa Clara River, northwest of the Red Mountains along local roads, northwest of the city of St. George, the county seat of Washington County. Its elevation is 3,658 feet (1,115 m). Although Gunlock is unincorporated, it has a post office, with the ZIP code of 84733.

== History ==
Historical population
Census	Pop.	Note	%±
1880	156		—
1890	92		−41.0%
1900	100		8.7%
1910	112		12.0%
1920	115		2.7%
1930	139		20.9%
1940	105		−24.5%
1950	89		−15.2%
Source: U.S. Census Bureau

Gunlock was first settled in 1857 by William "Gunlock Will" Hamblin, a pioneer settler and brother of Jacob Hamblin. During a visit to the site later that year George Albert Smith (an LDS Church general authority) named the community in honor of its first settler. In 1862, following severe flooding on the Santa Clara River at the community's former site, the original settlement was moved north to its present location.

In 1881 an adobe church/schoolhouse was completed; although classes were held in the building prior to its completion. That building was replaced by another church/schoolhouse in 1912. After several renovations over more than a century since its completion, the second building now serves as the Gunlock town hall.

== Events ==
Gunlock is the site of the Annual Gunlock Rodeo. The Rodeo is held traditionally on or around the 4th of July. This event has been held in Gunlock annually since 1945 and revenue from the event helps support community facilities.
