= Canyon Mountains =

Mountain range in Utah, United States

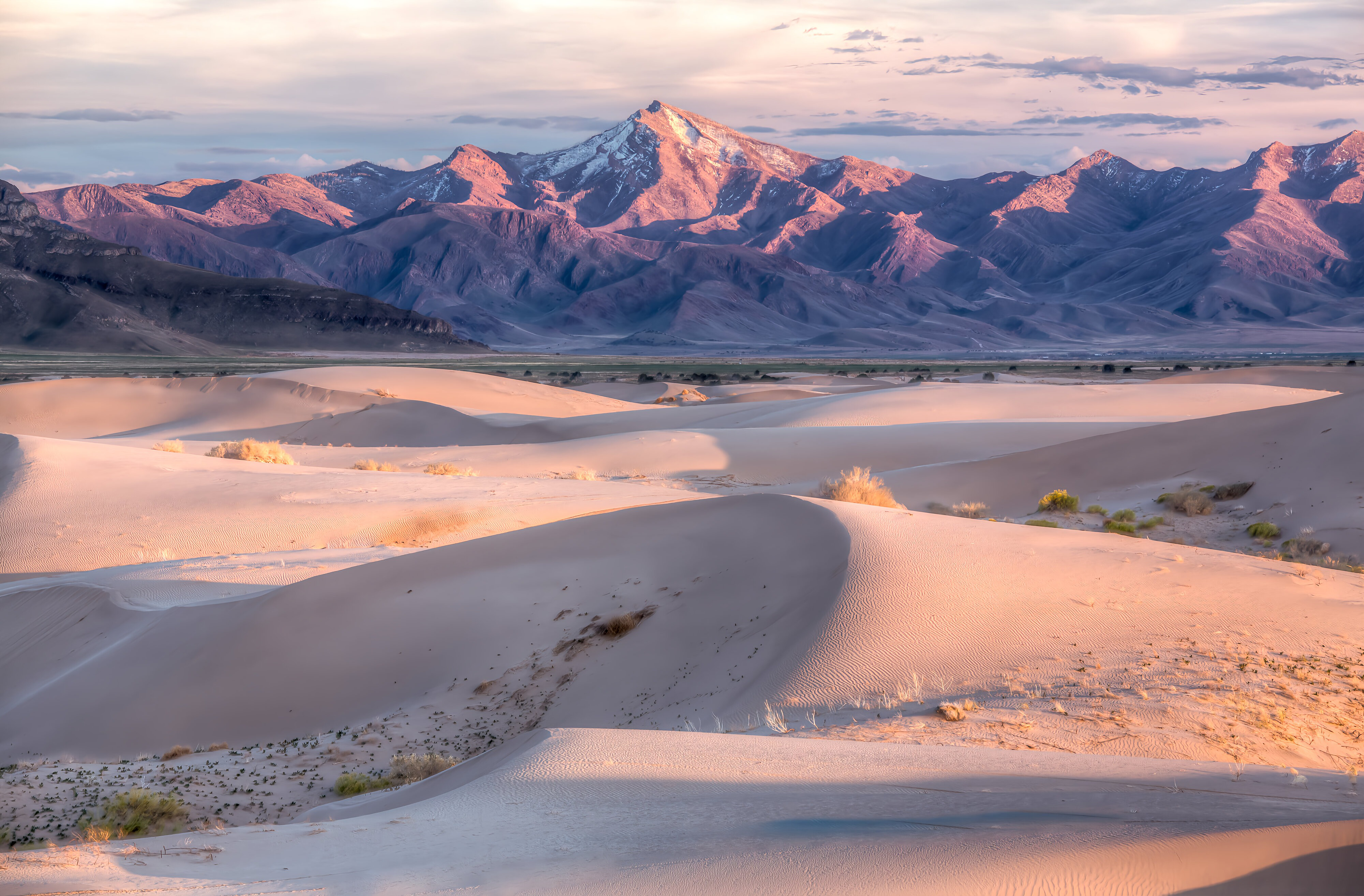
- Fool Creek Peak in the distance

Highest point
- Peak: Fool Creek Peak
- Elevation: 9,717 ft (2,962 m)
- Coordinates: 39°23′35″N 112°12′26″W

Dimensions
- Length: 25 mi (40 km) SSW x NNE
- Width: 12 mi (19 km)

Geography
- Location within Utah
- Country: United States
- State: Utah
- Region: Great Basin Desert
- Counties: Millard and Juab
- Communities: Oak City, Leamington, Mills, Scipio and McCornick
- Borders on: Sevier River, Oak Creek Sinks, Gilson Mountains, West Hills, Little Valley, Valley Mountains, Pavant Range and Pavant Valley

The Canyon Mountains are a 25-mile (40 km) long mountain range located in the northeast corner of Millard County, Utah; the range is bisected north-south with a southeast border section of Juab County.

The Canyon Mountains are part of the north section of the Fishlake National Forest, but the west of the range borders the northeast of the Sevier Desert, and the adjacent Sevier River.

== Geography ==
The range is a small Basin and Range Province section of mountains that merge into the smaller Gilson Mountains north traversed by Utah route 132. To the southeast the range merges into the Pavant Range also part of the Fishlake National Forest; between the two, Interstate 15 traverses northeast to Scipio and then further to Nephi, Utah.

The highpoint of the range is Fool Creek Peak, at 9,717 feet (2,962 m), lying on the two county borders, but slightly east of the range's center (1.5 mi).

=== North range terminus: Sevier River ===
The Sevier River enters the northeast Sevier Desert at the northeast, then north of the range, with the south border of the Gilson Mountains. The Sevier River makes its final exit from the mountains, and valleys associated with the western flank of the Wasatch Ranges, as well as the Wasatch and Sevier Plateaus. The massif of the Pavant-Tushar Mountains are south; the river flows north along the east flanks, then north-northeast along the east flank of the Valley Mountains, then northwest along the north of Little Valley, then northwest, then due-west past the Gilson and Canyon Mountains into the Sevier Desert. The river turns southwest to Leamington, then Delta, then due-west towards the west Sevier Desert.

== See also ==
- List of mountain ranges of Utah
