= Gilson Mountains =

Mountain in the American state of Utah

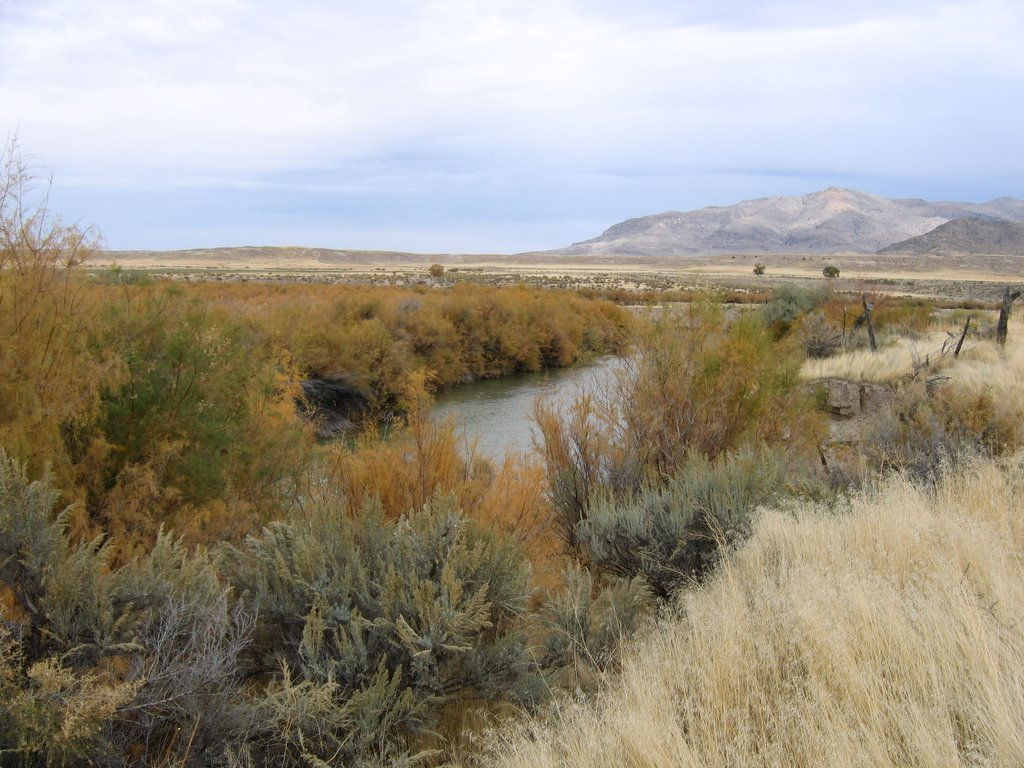
- Southwest flank of Gilson Mountains, October 2005

Highest point
- Peak: Champlin Peak
- Elevation: 7,504 ft (2,287 m)
- Coordinates: 39°37′00″N 112°13′14″W

Dimensions
- Length: 11 mi (18 km) SSW x NNE
- Width: 8 mi (13 km)

Geography
- Location within Utah
- Country: United States
- State: Utah
- Regions: (southeast)-Great Basin (northeast)-Sevier Desert
- County: Juab
- Communities: Jericho Junction, Champlin, Soma, Uisco, Leamington and Mack
- Borders on: Sevier Desert, Tintic Valley, East Tintic Mountains, Juab Valley, Sevier River and Canyon Mountains

The Gilson Mountains are an 11-mile (18 km) long almost circular, small mountain range adjacent the north terminus of the Canyon Mountains, (due-north trendline), located in far eastern Juab County, Utah, United States.

== Description ==
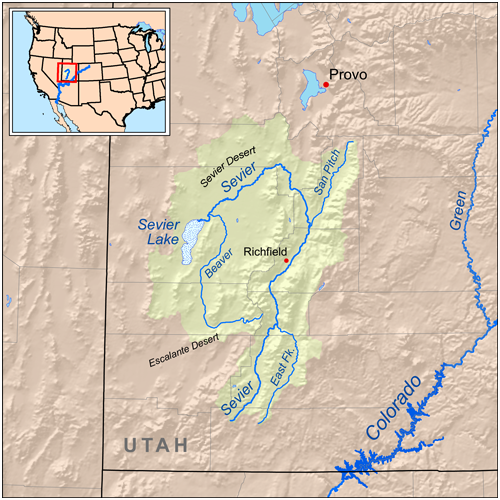
Sevier River Basin

The Gilson Mountains are an ovoid, or elliptical shaped range, about 11-mile (18 km) long, trending south-southwest by north-northeast. It contains a central massif with Champlin Peak; two ridgelines trend from the center to the southwest. From Champlin Peak in the range center, Broad Canyon lies between the two ridges. To the northwest another major canyon abuts the center ridgeline, Long Canyon.

Another ridgeline is formed off the center peak going northeast. Unimproved Gilson Road accesses the canyon on its north, and traverses to an area just northeast of Champlin Peak.

The highpoint of the range is Champlin Peak, at 7,504 feet (2,287 m).

The mountain range is separated from the Canyon Mountains by the Sevier River and its narrow rivercourse and canyonlands, where the river flows northeast, then southwest, then due-west past the southwest flank of the Gilson Mountains, to enter the extreme northeast of the Sevier Desert. It is at this exit point between the two ranges that the Sevier River enters the desert, of the Great Basin, after traversing mountains, valleys, plateaus, and extensive mountain ranges.

Abutting the northwest flank of the range is the Little Sahara Recreation Area, an area of desert and dunefields. The Little Sahara site is slightly larger in area than the Gilson Mountains.

== Access ==
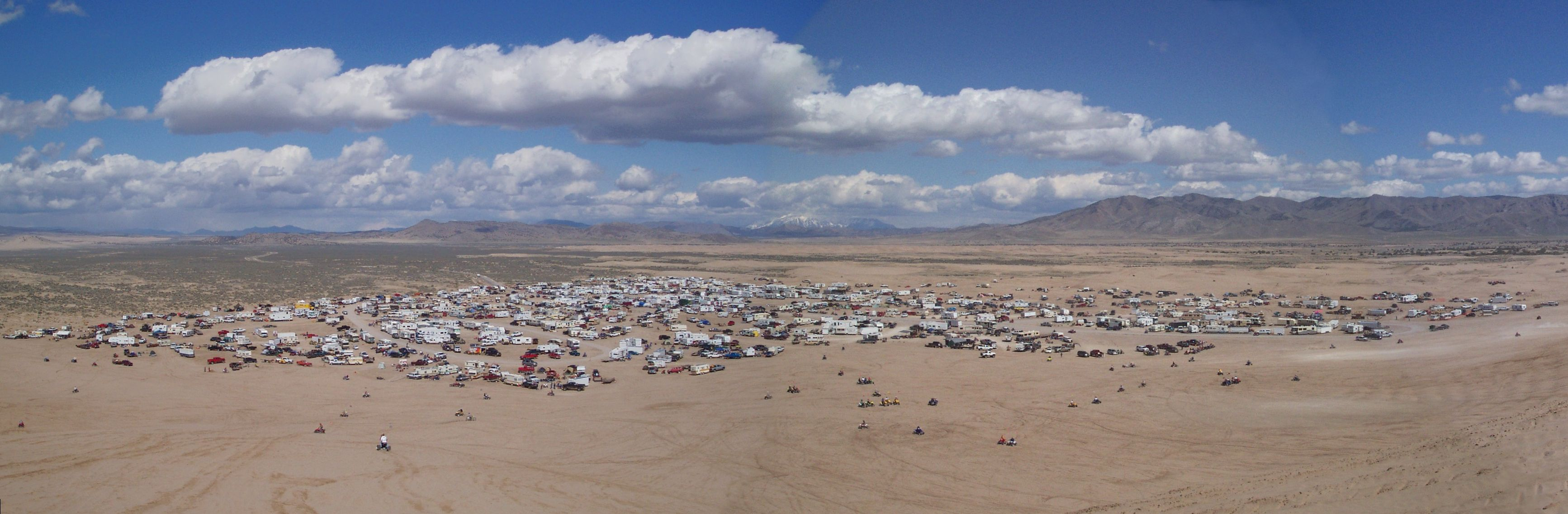
View Northeast and Southeast — northwest flank Gilson Mountains (photo right), Spring Break 2004

U.S. Route 6 (US-6) traverses the northeast perimeter of the Sevier Desert, at the west and northwest flanks of the Gilson Mountains. At Jericho Junction, Utah north of the range, an improved route goes west, then southwest into desert flatlands, hills, and dunefields of the Little Sahara Recreation Area to the Sand Mountain recreation site. Numerous unimproved roads from US-6 access the west and north of the mountain range.

Utah State Route 132 (SR-132) from Lynndyl and Leamington to the west, traverses the south and southeast flanks of the range following the Sevier River rivercourse, and canyonland. Near the southeast flank center at Soma, the Sevier turns due southeast, following the northeast flank of the Canyon Mountains. At the Gilson southeast flank, SR-132 continues northeastwards through a hill and mountain region, south of the East Tintic Mountains, and continues on to Nephi, about 25-mile (40 km) distant.
