= McCornick, Utah =

McCornick
- Unincorporated community
- Location within Utah Location within the United States
- Coordinates: 39°12′56″N 112°24′30″W
- Country: United States
- State: Utah
- County: Millard
- Established: 1919
- Abandoned: 1930
- Named for: William McCornick
- Elevation: 4,747 ft (1,447 m)
- GNIS feature ID: 1455891

McCornick is an unincorporated community and near-ghost town located in Millard County, Utah, United States. Lying in Whiskey Creek Flat 11 miles (18 km) northwest of Holden, McCornick was a failed land development project that lasted from 1919 until circa 1930. Today, McCornick is made up of a few scattered homes and farms.

== History ==
In 1918, the Sevier River Land and Water Company, after successfully promoting development in the Lynndyl area, expanded its water project southward. The company built an aqueduct from Leamington along the foothills of the Canyon Mountains to irrigate vast tracts of potentially fertile farmland. Boosters began to draw prospective settlers with sophisticated advertising and high-pressure sales pitches. Salesmen emphasized the conveniences of farming so close to Delta, with its large sugar refinery and the main line of the Union Pacific Railroad. They also spoke glowingly of the water supply, which was at the highest level the region had seen in years.

A number of families and bachelors arrived and began farming in early 1919. In May 1919, the canal broke, flooding the farms of about 15 families who had made their homes near the mouth of Whiskey Creek. Despite the damage, the plentiful water produced excellent harvests for most of the farmers that year, enabling them to build some 40 good, permanent homes.

The next year the canal broke a second time, and some families moved away completely, but reports of the settlement's success continued to bring new settlers. In 1920 it began to take shape as a real town. The Church of Jesus Christ of Latter-day Saints built a chapel and organized a ward with 83 member families. A small post office was established, and the town was named for William McCornick, a Salt Lake City banker and corporate promoter of the Sevier Land and Water Company. A schoolhouse and a general store were built. McCornick's population reached its peak of about 500 in 1921.

=== Decline ===
The turning point came in the winter of 1921–1922, the driest in many years. There followed a succession of dry years, grasshopper plagues, and dust storms. McCornick had been heavily over-promoted and supplied with sorely inadequate irrigation water. Developers had promised the ability to irrigate 200,000 acres (81,000 ha), but in 1922 found they couldn't provide enough water for even 1,000 acres (400 ha). In fact the wet years around 1917–1921 had been an anomaly; the region was reverting to its normal desert state. In 1923 there were only 50 families left in town. By 1926 the Sevier River Land and Water Company was bankrupt, sold off to a California company, and reorganized as the Central Utah Water Company. The reorganization did nothing to keep the settlers, who continued to move away. By 1929 there were only four or five families left.

McCornick recorded a total of 95 births and 10 deaths in its brief existence. Many of its buildings were moved to other towns; the schoolhouse was taken to Flowell in 1930. Two or three of the old houses still stand, and the land is used mostly for pasture and hay.

== See also ==
- List of ghost towns in Utah
