= Topaz Marsh =

Coordinates: 39.425939°N 112.760894°W

Topaz Slough Wildlife Management Area (Topaz Slough WMA) or Topaz Marsh is a marsh system that is part of the old Sevier River bed.

The water source stems from springs and irrigation runoff.

== Fauna ==
Topaz Slough WMA is a historical use area for waterfowl and marsh dwelling species. Many different species of birds such as ducks, coots, geese, kestrels, great blue herons, and various shoreline birds can be found during the year.

Occasionally, big animals like antelope use water on the west side of the slough. Furbearers include coyote, badger, red fox, and muskrat. Small game species that inhabit the WMA include cottontail rabbits, ring-necked pheasants, and mourning doves.
