= Oasis, Utah =

- CDP
- Location of Oasis within Millard County and the State of Utah.
- Coordinates: 39°17′31″N 112°37′46″W
- Country: United States
- State: Utah
- County: Millard
- Settled: 1880

Area
  - Total: 0.4 sq mi (1.0 km^{2})
  - Land: 0.4 sq mi (1.0 km^{2})
  - Water: 0.0 sq mi (0 km^{2})
- Elevation: 4,590 ft (1,400 m)

Population (2020)
  - Total: 58
  - Density: 140/sq mi (56/km^{2})
- Time zone: UTC-7 (Mountain (MST))
  - Summer (DST): UTC-6 (MDT)
- ZIP codes: 84624, 84650
- Area code: 435
- GNIS feature ID: 2584773

Oasis is a census-designated place in northeastern Millard County, Utah, United States. The population was 58 at the 2020 census. Once the main rail shipping point in Millard County, Oasis declined in importance after the establishment of Delta, now the county's largest city.

== Geography ==
Oasis is located in the eastern Sevier Desert of Millard County, approximately 140 miles (230 km) southwest of Salt Lake City. Oasis lies some 6 miles (9.7 km) southwest of Delta, and 2 miles (3.2 km) east of the village of Deseret, with which it has always been closely associated. About 4 miles (6.4 km) north is Gunnison Bend Reservoir, the last impoundment of the Sevier River. The area consists of irrigated farmland on the edge of harsh desert, an oasis east of Swasey Mountain.

=== Climate ===
According to the Köppen Climate Classification system, Oasis has a semi-arid climate, abbreviated "BSk" on climate maps.

== History ==
The Utah Southern Railroad Extension reached the Oasis area in October 1879, and by 1880 a settlement had begun to develop. Originally named Deseret Station, it became known as Oasis by 1885. In the early years, a small dam near Deseret provided all the irrigation water. Then in 1886, the Oasis and Riverside Canal Company and the Gunnison Bend Canal Company were organized, with ambitious plans to expand the cultivation of the surrounding land. The canal projects took years longer than expected, but supported steady population growth.

In the meantime, Oasis's main economic activity was as a railroad station. The precious metal mines of Frisco and Joy provided substantial freight traffic to the shipping point at Oasis. The station served communities as distant as Baker, Nevada, 100 miles (160 km) away. It also made an attractive location for shearing sheep, shipping livestock, and outfitting ranches. A small commercial center began to develop, with a general store, hotel, restaurant, saloon, bank, and other small businesses.

In 1891, the Deseret Ward of The Church of Jesus Christ of Latter-day Saints was divided into three congregations, for Hinckley, Deseret, and Oasis. It is from this time that Oasis is usually regarded as a separate community, an outgrowth of Deseret.

The location for the town that became Delta was chosen at a 1905 meeting of the Melville Irrigation Company held in Oasis. Originally named Burtner, the new town boomed. The Oasis Land and Water Company was organized in 1908 to develop water and land west of Burtner, but it failed due to flooding and financial problems in 1910. The Burtner project, on the other hand, was wildly successful, selling thousands of acres per month. In the 1910 census, Burtner's population was nearly double that of Oasis. Homesteaders streamed into the makeshift railroad depot, which by 1911 was the busiest in the county. That year Burtner was renamed Delta, and the railroad built a new Delta Station, the largest south of Salt Lake City. The centrally located Delta permanently supplanted Oasis in prominence.

Its railroad business gone, Oasis returned to agricultural industries. Alfalfa seed, lumber, and sugar beets were important products. A few businesses rounded up and trained Mustang horses for sale. A creamery was established in 1913.

A coal-fired power plant was built in Oasis in the 1920s. Small and inefficient, it served Deseret, Hinckley, and Delta until 1930.

The last years of the 1920s were hard on the entire region. Drought, insects, and frost damaged crop yields, and numerous farms closed down under financial difficulties. The Oasis State Bank went out of business in 1928. Continuing drought conditions in the 1930s severely reduced the available irrigation water, and large tracts of farmland in the Oasis area had to be abandoned.

In June 1983, about 400 people in the Deseret–Oasis area were evacuated when the Gunnison Bend dam and the DMAD dam above it failed due to that year's excessive spring runoff. Some 16,000 acre-feet (20,000,000 m^{3}) of water inundated a large area with Oasis approximately in the center, leaving about 70,000 acres (280 km^{2}) of farmland with no means of irrigation that year.

== Demographics ==
Historical population
Census	Pop.	Note	%±
1890	199		—
1900	248		24.6%
1910	245		−1.2%
1920	307		25.3%
1930	364		18.6%
1940	224		−38.5%
1950	190		−15.2%
2010	75		—
2020	58		−22.7%
Source: U.S. Census Bureau

As of the census of 2010, there were 75 people living in the CDP. There were 28 housing units. The racial makeup was 78.7% White, 4.0% American Indian and Alaska Native, 14.7% from some other race, and 2.7% from two or more races. Hispanic or Latino of any race were 17.3% of the population.

== See also ==
- List of census-designated places in Utah
