= Marysvale Canyon =

Canyon in Utah

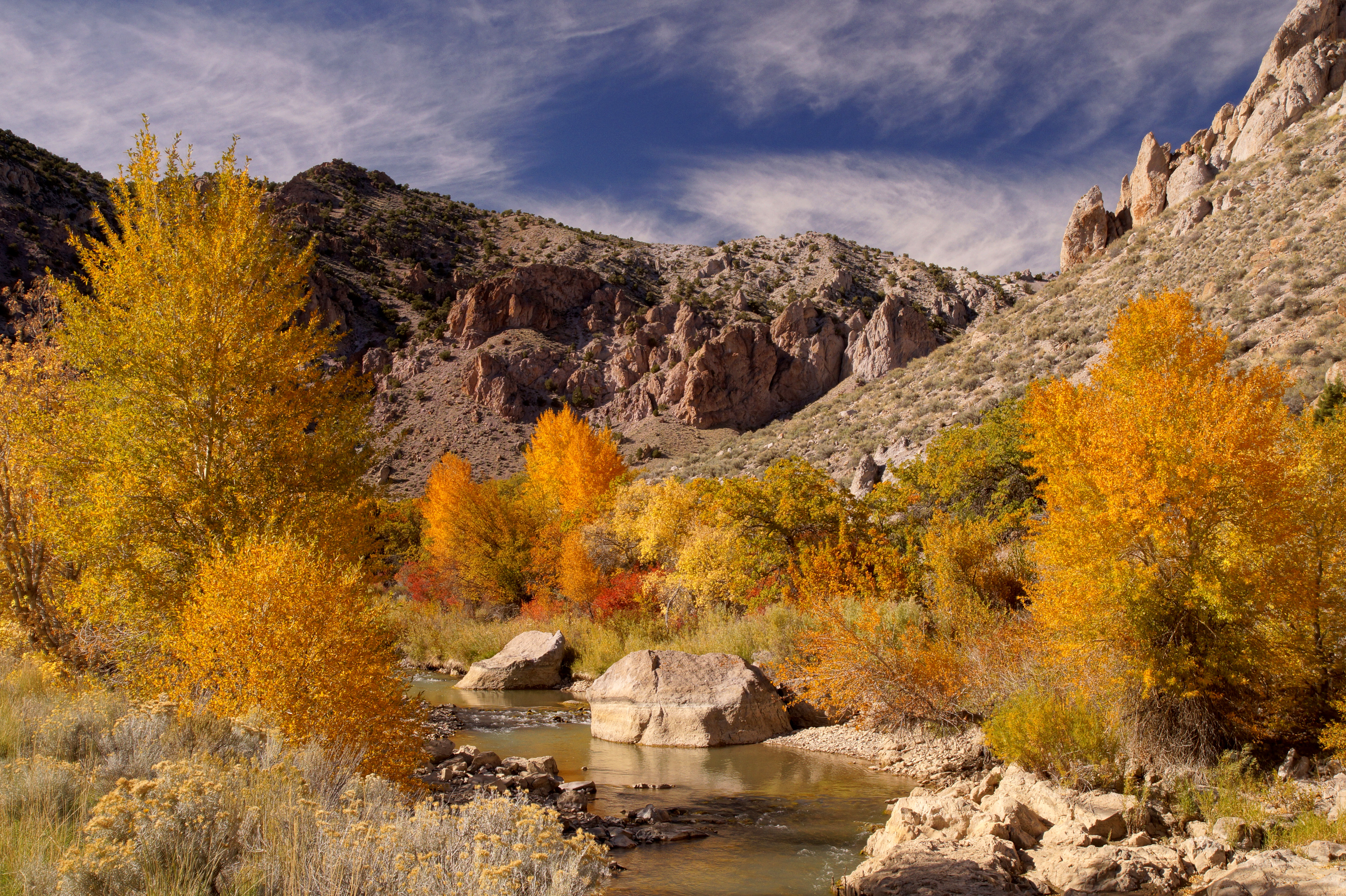
- Fall in Marysvale Canyon, October 2014

- Location within Utah Location within the United States
- Elevation: 4,939 feet (1,505 m)

Third Approach
- Location: Piute County, Utah, Sevier County, Utah
- Coordinates: 38.5172°N 112.2651°W

Marysvale Canyon (sometimes referred to as Sevier Canyon) /sɛˈvɪər/ is a canyon in Piute and Sevier counties in southwest Utah, United States, which runs eight miles (13 km) north from just north of Marysvale north to the town of Sevier.

== Description ==
The canyon is a steep walled canyon formed by the flow of the meandering Sevier River. The narrow canyon lies between Sargent Mountain on the northeast corner of the Tushar Mountains to the west and the margin of the small Antelope Range of Sevier County to the east. The canyon ends to the north at the intersection of the Sevier River with Clear Creek Canyon which forms the north margin of the Tushars. To the south the canyon starts about two miles (3.2 km) north of Marysvale where the broad Sevier Valley narrows abruptly from a broad 5–8-mile-wide (8.0–12.9 km) valley to a narrow gorge.

Points of interest in the canyon are Big Rock Candy Mountain, old mining sites, and the rail tunnels along the old Marysvale Branch of the Denver and Rio Grande Western Railroad that has been converted to a hiking/biking path.

== See also ==
- List of canyons and gorges in Utah
