= Pahvant Range =

Mountain range in Utah, United States

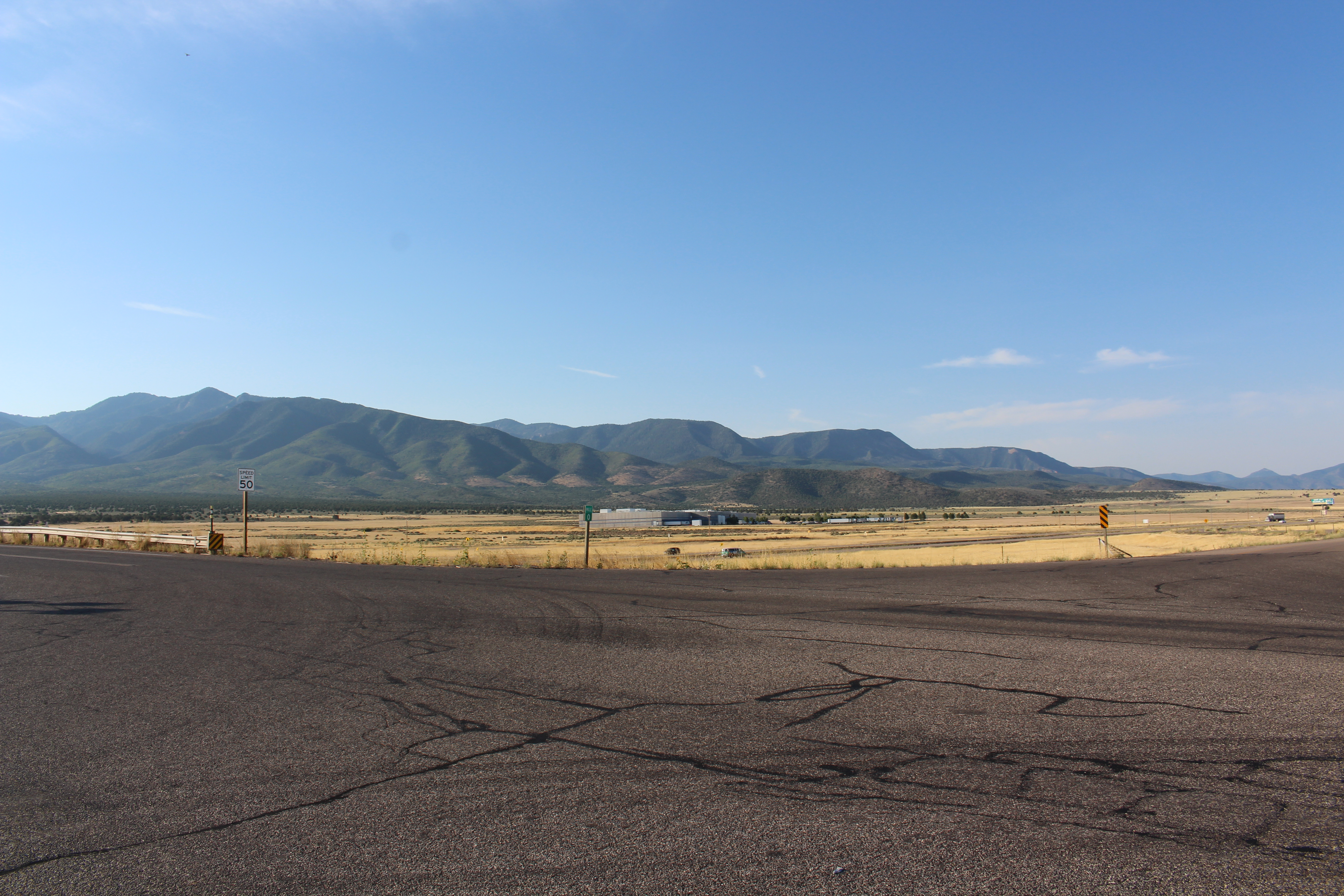
- View of the Pahvant Range, looking southeast from Fillmore, July 2013

Highest point
- Peak: Mine Camp Peak, Pavant Range center, west (Millard County)
- Coordinates: 38°52′27″N 112°15′13″W

Dimensions
- Length: 50 mi (80 km) SSW x NNE
- Width: 15 mi (24 km) E-W

Geography
- Location within Utah
- Country: United States
- State: Utah
- Region: Great Basin Desert, southeast
- Counties: Millard and Sevier
- Cities: Fillmore, Richfield & Maple Grove
- Range coordinates: 38°54′N 112°13′W
- Borders on: Canyon Mountains-NNW; Sevier Desert-W & NW; Tushar Mountains-S; Valley Mountains-(minor range)-NE; Sevier Plateau-E & SE

The Pahvant Range (also Pavant Range) is a mountain range in central Utah, United States, east of Fillmore.

== Description ==
The range is named for the Pahvant tribe, a branch of the Ute people. The tallest peaks are Pioneer Peak at 10,466 feet (3,190 m), Mine Camp Peak at 10,222 feet (3,116 m), Sunset Peak at 10,088 feet (3,075 m), and Coffee Peak at 10,002 feet (3,049 m). Most of the land in the Pavant range is part of Fishlake National Forest.

Richfield lies in the Sevier River valley to the southeast of the range and Fillmore lies in the Pavant Valley along the northwest side of the range.

The Pavant Range merges into the Tushar Mountains on the south.

== Transportation ==
Interstate 15 crosses the extreme north end of the range at Scipio pass, near Scipio. Interstate 70 crosses at a pass between the Pavant Range and the Tushar Mountains to the south.

== Meteorite ==
Iron meteorite fragments with a mass of 240 grams (8.5 oz) named the Salina Meteorite were found in the Pavant Range in 1908.
