= Jericho, Utah =

Ghost town in Juab County, Utah, United States

- Ghost town
- Location of Jericho within Utah Location of Jericho within the United States
- Coordinates: 39°45′00″N 112°12′20″W
- Country: United States
- State: Utah
- County: Juab
- Elevation: 5,319 ft (1,621 m)
- Time zone: UTC-7 (Mountain (MST))
  - Summer (DST): UTC-6 (MDT)
- ZIP codes: 84628
- Area code: 435
- GNIS feature ID: 1437597

Jericho is a ghost town in eastern Juab County, Utah, United States. It is located the southern part of the Tintic Valley, about 30 miles (48 km) west of Nephi and 103 miles (166 km) southwest of Salt Lake City.

== Description ==
The site of the former community is situated along Union Pacific Railroad's (UP) Lynndyl Subdivision. It can be reached by U.S. Route 6 (Grand Army of the Republic Highway) by either heading south from Eureka or heading northeast from Delta. The area can also be reached by heading west from Nephi on Utah State Route 132.

Jericho was so named on account of its desolate, isolated, and sandy surroundings. The ghost town is near the Little Sahara Recreation Area, an area consisting of sand dunes. The area is popular among off-road vehicle users, motocross bikers, and campers. The climate of the area is hot in the summers, commonly from 90 to 100 degrees Fahrenheit and winters are cold, between 30- and 40-degrees Fahrenheit. The climate is typical of that of the Great Basin Desert.

The State Road Commission of Utah (predecessor to the Utah Department of Transportation) named a nearby highway junction after the former community (Jericho Junction).

== History ==
Jericho was originally a sheep shearing corral along the Los Angeles and Salt Lake Railroad (now the UP's Lynndyl Subdivision). later became a camp for the Civilian Conservation Corps (Camp Jericho).

== See also ==
- List of ghost towns in Utah
