= Sevier, Utah =

Unincorporated community in the state of Utah, United States

Sevier
- Unincorporated community
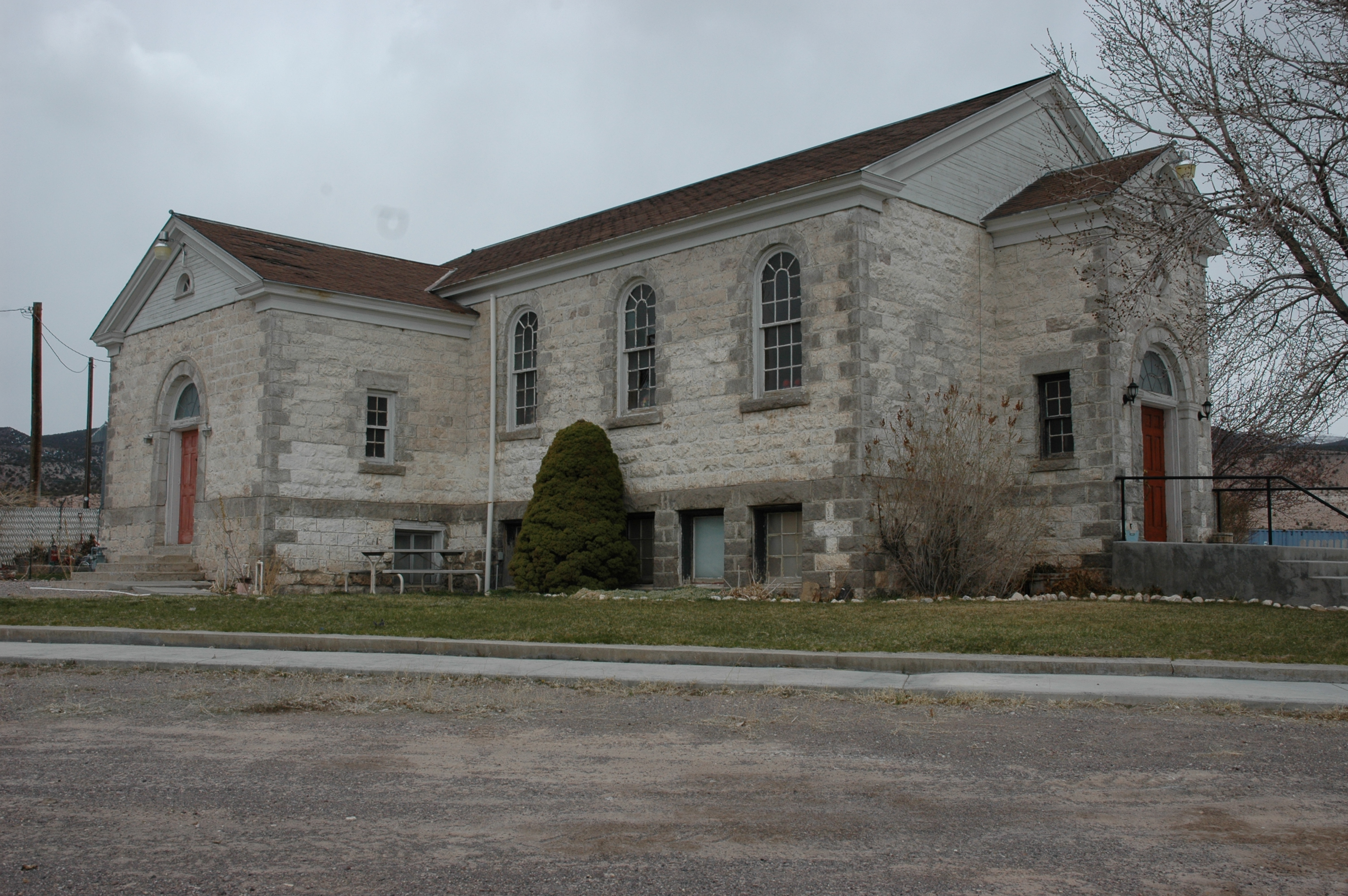
- The old Sevier Ward Church, April 2010

- Location within the state of Utah
- Coordinates: 38°35′11″N 112°15′30″W
- Country: United States
- State: Utah
- County: Sevier
- Elevation: 5,584 ft (1,702 m)
- Time zone: UTC-7 (Mountain (MST))
  - Summer (DST): UTC-6 (MDT)
- ZIP codes: 84766
- Area code: 435
- GNIS feature ID: 1445446

Sevier (/sɛˈvɪər/ sə-VEER) is an unincorporated community in southwestern Sevier County, Utah, United States. It lies in the valley of the Sevier River along Sevier Highway, the former route of U.S. Route 89, southwest of the city of Richfield, the county seat of Sevier County. Its elevation is 5,584 feet (1,702 m).

== Description ==
Although Sevier is unincorporated, it has a post office, with the ZIP code of 84766. It has a population of approximately 146 people. Sevier has many farms, primarily growing alfalfa.

Sevier experienced rapid population growth through the 1990s and 2000s; seasonal migrant laborers, mostly of Mexican and other Hispanic nationalities, made the population transfluid over the course of the years.

== Climate ==
This climatic region is typified by large seasonal temperature differences, with warm to hot (and often humid) summers and cold (sometimes severely cold) winters. According to the Köppen Climate Classification system, Sevier has a humid continental climate, abbreviated "Dfb" on climate maps.
