= Oak City, Utah =

Town in the state of Utah, United States

- Town
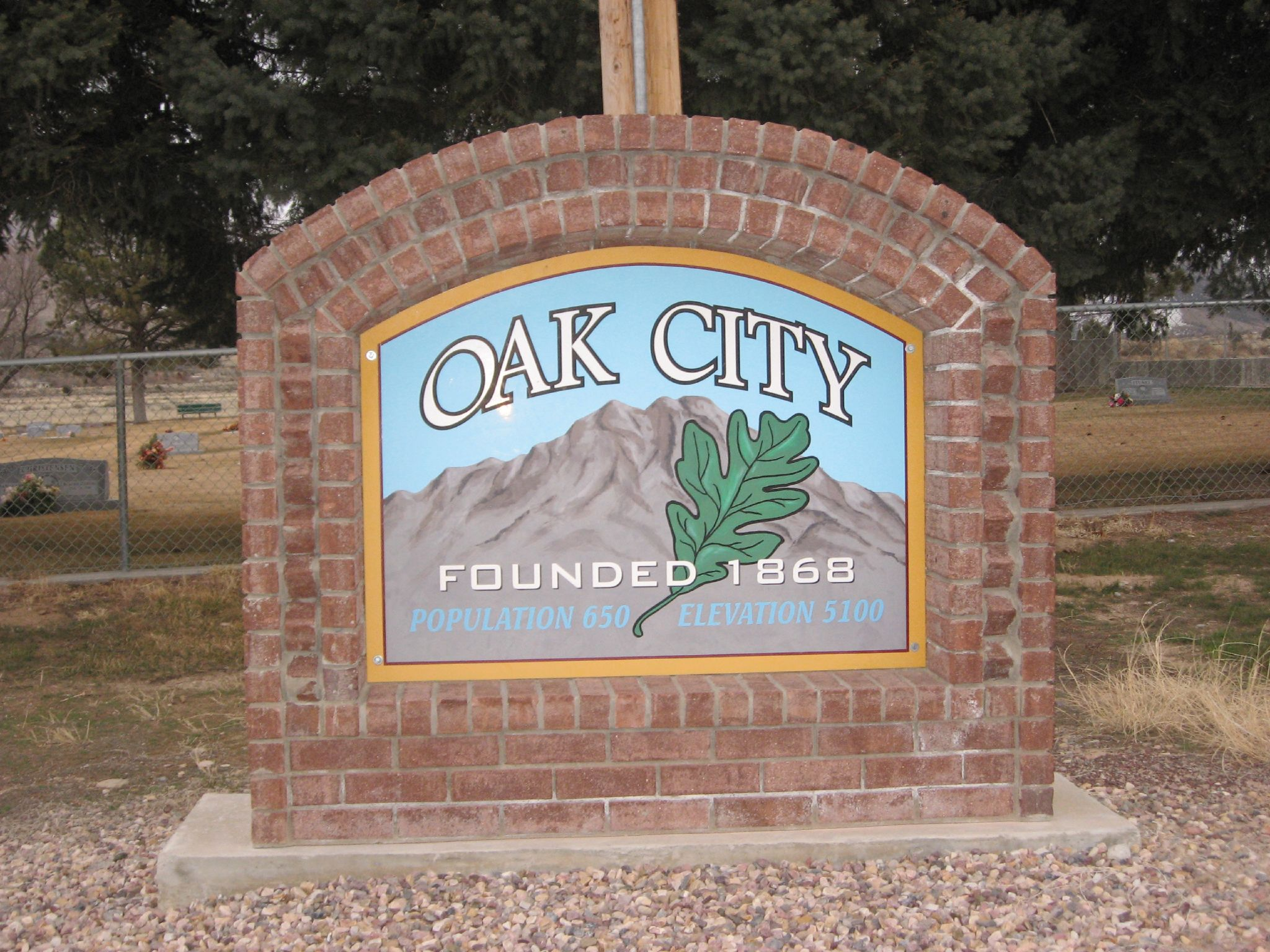
- Welcome sign

- Location in Millard County and the state of Utah.
- Coordinates: 39°22′34″N 112°20′23″W
- Country: United States
- State: Utah
- County: Millard

Area
  - Total: 0.94 sq mi (2.44 km^{2})
  - Land: 0.94 sq mi (2.44 km^{2})
  - Water: 0 sq mi (0.00 km^{2})
- Elevation: 5,095 ft (1,553 m)

Population (2020)
  - Total: 595
  - Density: 689.6/sq mi (266.25/km^{2})
- Time zone: UTC-7 (Mountain (MST))
  - Summer (DST): UTC-6 (MDT)
- ZIP code: 84649
- Area code: 435
- FIPS code: 49-55430
- GNIS feature ID: 2413060
- Website: oakcityut.gov

Oak City is a town in Millard County, Utah, United States. The population was 595 at the 2020 census.

== Geography ==
According to the United States Census, the town has a total area of 0.7 square miles (1.8 km^{2}), all land.

=== Climate ===
Oak City has a cold semi-arid climate (Köppen: BSk).

Climate data for Oak City, Utah, 1991–2020 normals, extremes 1905–present
| Month | Jan | Feb | Mar | Apr | May | Jun | Jul | Aug | Sep | Oct | Nov | Dec | Year |
|---|---|---|---|---|---|---|---|---|---|---|---|---|---|
| Record high °F (°C) | 68 (20) | 75 (24) | 88 (31) | 87 (31) | 100 (38) | 105 (41) | 109 (43) | 105 (41) | 100 (38) | 97 (36) | 86 (30) | 68 (20) | 109 (43) |
| Mean maximum °F (°C) | 53.8 (12.1) | 60.4 (15.8) | 70.9 (21.6) | 78.9 (26.1) | 88.3 (31.3) | 96.7 (35.9) | 101.7 (38.7) | 98.7 (37.1) | 93.1 (33.9) | 81.9 (27.7) | 68.2 (20.1) | 56.8 (13.8) | 102.2 (39.0) |
| Mean daily maximum °F (°C) | 38.6 (3.7) | 44.2 (6.8) | 54.7 (12.6) | 61.3 (16.3) | 72.6 (22.6) | 84.9 (29.4) | 93.3 (34.1) | 90.9 (32.7) | 81.0 (27.2) | 65.6 (18.7) | 50.7 (10.4) | 39.1 (3.9) | 64.7 (18.2) |
| Daily mean °F (°C) | 29.3 (−1.5) | 34.1 (1.2) | 42.7 (5.9) | 48.6 (9.2) | 58.9 (14.9) | 70.4 (21.3) | 78.8 (26.0) | 76.7 (24.8) | 66.7 (19.3) | 52.7 (11.5) | 39.3 (4.1) | 29.3 (−1.5) | 52.3 (11.3) |
| Mean daily minimum °F (°C) | 20.1 (−6.6) | 23.9 (−4.5) | 30.8 (−0.7) | 36.0 (2.2) | 45.3 (7.4) | 55.8 (13.2) | 64.3 (17.9) | 62.4 (16.9) | 52.5 (11.4) | 39.7 (4.3) | 28.0 (−2.2) | 19.5 (−6.9) | 39.9 (4.4) |
| Mean minimum °F (°C) | 5.3 (−14.8) | 9.1 (−12.7) | 18.7 (−7.4) | 24.4 (−4.2) | 31.8 (−0.1) | 41.2 (5.1) | 53.9 (12.2) | 52.0 (11.1) | 37.9 (3.3) | 25.6 (−3.6) | 13.6 (−10.2) | 3.4 (−15.9) | −0.2 (−17.9) |
| Record low °F (°C) | −28 (−33) | −28 (−33) | −6 (−21) | 3 (−16) | 20 (−7) | 26 (−3) | 33 (1) | 32 (0) | 17 (−8) | 4 (−16) | −11 (−24) | −26 (−32) | −28 (−33) |
| Average precipitation inches (mm) | 1.26 (32) | 1.31 (33) | 1.83 (46) | 1.80 (46) | 1.45 (37) | 0.70 (18) | 0.42 (11) | 0.56 (14) | 0.86 (22) | 1.35 (34) | 0.99 (25) | 1.37 (35) | 13.90 (353) |
| Average snowfall inches (cm) | 7.2 (18) | 6.5 (17) | 5.9 (15) | 2.8 (7.1) | 0.1 (0.25) | 0.0 (0.0) | 0.0 (0.0) | 0.0 (0.0) | trace | 0.4 (1.0) | 3.6 (9.1) | 6.8 (17) | 33.3 (85) |
| Average precipitation days (≥ 0.01 in) | 6.0 | 5.9 | 6.5 | 6.7 | 6.6 | 2.9 | 3.0 | 3.3 | 3.9 | 4.8 | 4.6 | 5.7 | 59.9 |
| Average snowy days (≥ 0.1 in) | 3.1 | 2.4 | 2.4 | 1.1 | 0.1 | 0.0 | 0.0 | 0.0 | 0.1 | 0.3 | 1.5 | 3.2 | 14.2 |
Source: NOAA

== Demographics ==
Historical population
| Census | Pop. | Note | %± |
|---|---|---|---|
| 1890 | 186 | | — |
| 1900 | 249 | | 33.9% |
| 1910 | 423 | | 69.9% |
| 1920 | 326 | | −22.9% |
| 1930 | 340 | | 4.3% |
| 1940 | 391 | | 15.0% |
| 1950 | 334 | | −14.6% |
| 1960 | 312 | | −6.6% |
| 1970 | 278 | | −10.9% |
| 1980 | 389 | | 39.9% |
| 1990 | 587 | | 50.9% |
| 2000 | 650 | | 10.7% |
| 2010 | 578 | | −11.1% |
| 2020 | 595 | | 2.9% |
U.S. Decennial Census

As of the census of 2000, there were 650 people, 167 households, and 140 families residing in the town. The population density was 972.8 people per square mile (374.6/km^{2}). There were 191 housing units at an average density of 285.9 per square mile (110.1/km^{2}). The racial makeup of the town was 96.92% White, 0.46% Native American, 1.23% from other races, and 1.38% from two or more races. Hispanic or Latino of any race were 1.54% of the population.

There were 167 households, out of which 57.5% had children under the age of 18 living with them, 79.6% were married couples living together, 3.0% had a female householder with no husband present, and 15.6% were non-families. 15.0% of all households were made up of individuals, and 9.6% had someone living alone who was 65 years of age or older. The average household size was 3.89 and the average family size was 4.40.

In the town, the population was spread out, with 46.0% under the age of 18, 6.0% from 18 to 24, 22.6% from 25 to 44, 15.7% from 45 to 64, and 9.7% who were 65 years of age or older. The median age was 22 years. For every 100 females, there were 121.1 males. For every 100 females age 18 and over, there were 104.1 males.

The median income for a household in the town was $47,375, and the median income for a family was $53,750. Males had a median income of $41,667 versus $26,250 for females. The per capita income for the town was $13,283. About 1.3% of families and 4.1% of the population were below the poverty line, including 3.8% of those under age 18 and 8.5% of those age 65 or over.

== Founding ==
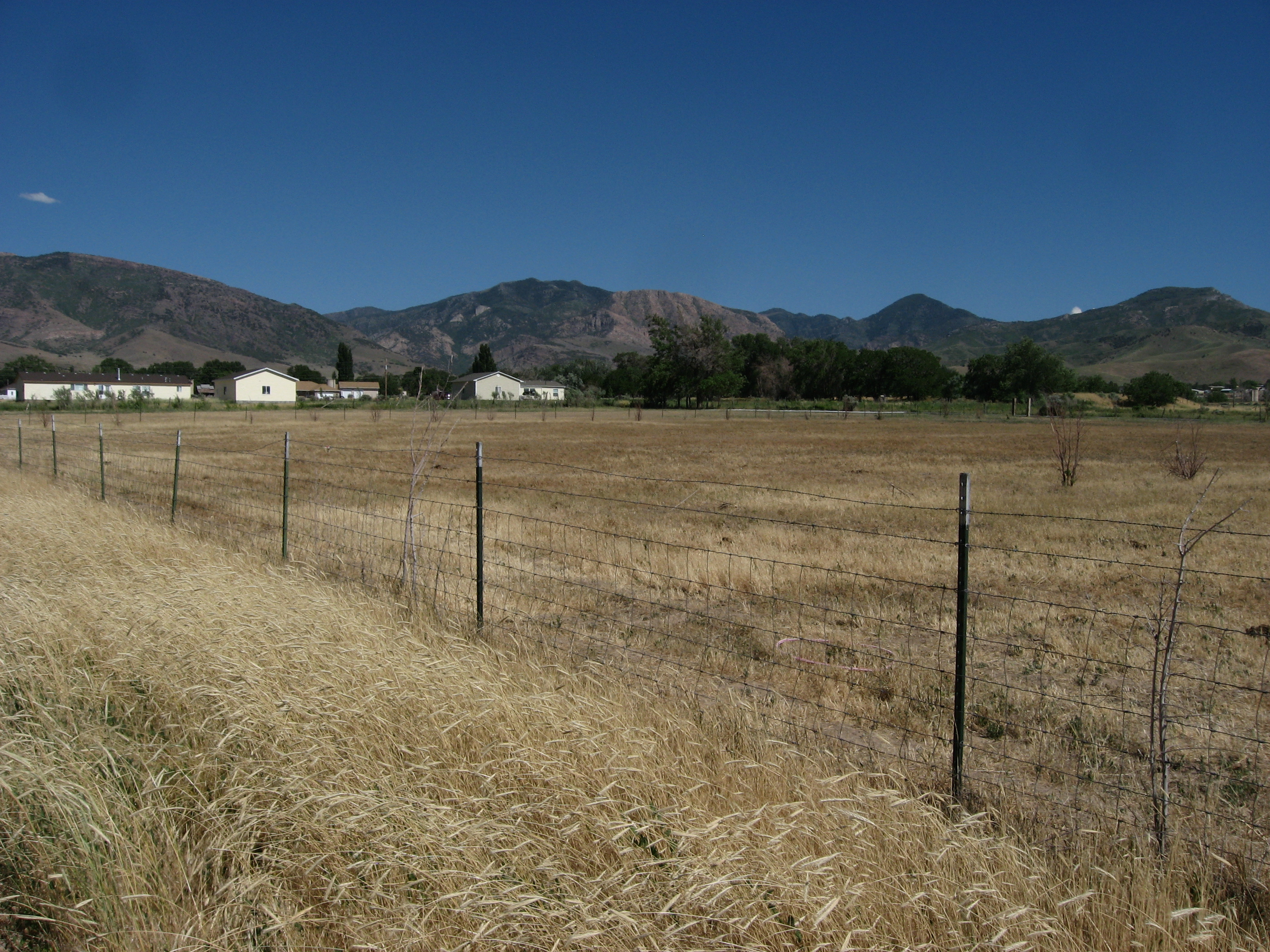
Oak City, 2010

The settlement of Oak City was begun in late summer of 1868, when a few families moved there from the community of Deseret, Utah. They had become discouraged after eight years of unsuccessful attempts to dam the Sevier River to provide water for their crops, and had left the area. The early settlers were familiar with the Oak City area because they had pastured their cattle there in the spring and fall. They chose this area to settle because of the reliable creek and the quality of the land for farming. The town was settled in two phases. The first phase took place in July 1868 and consisted of a few families and young men to survey the town site, clear the land for farming, and provide shelter for the coming winter. Twenty-three more families came in October and November of that year.

== The A-Bomb Project ==
Oak City in Millard County was the search director's first choice for the atomic weapons laboratory. Maj. John Dudley of the Manhattan District Staff was assigned to survey the West and find potential sites for an atomic laboratory in October 1942. His first choice for the laboratory site was Oak City, Utah, according to the Los Alamos history. "It was a delightful little oasis in south central Utah," Dudley wrote. "The railroad was only 16 miles away over a nice, easy road. The airport was not too distant. The water supply was good. It was surrounded by hills, and beyond there was mostly desert. However, I noticed one thing: If we took over this area we would evict several dozen families and we would also take a large amount of farm acreage out of production."

Because of the potential loss of farmland, Dudley recommended his second choice — Jemez Springs, New Mexico. In the end, Dudley's choice was overruled by J. Robert Oppenheimer, a physicist and the scientific director of the Manhattan Project. He favored Los Alamos.

== Celebrations ==
=== Oak City Days ===
Oak City Days is held the third week of August every year when the citizens of Oak City host a two-day event to celebrate the founding of the city. It has also been known as ward days and homecoming in the past. Oak City Days is kicked off with a parade on Friday evening followed by an ice cream social. Following the ice cream social there is a program. There are also various competitions such as a Rook tournament. On Saturday a town lunch is prepared which feeds over 1000 people. Craft booths, kids games (including a children’s fish catch), as well as adult fun fill the day. The festivities end with a dance under the stars with music by the local band The Moonlighters.

== See also ==
- List of cities and towns in Utah
