= Little Sahara Recreation Area =

Recreation area in Juab County, Utah, United States

- Little Sahara Sand Dunes
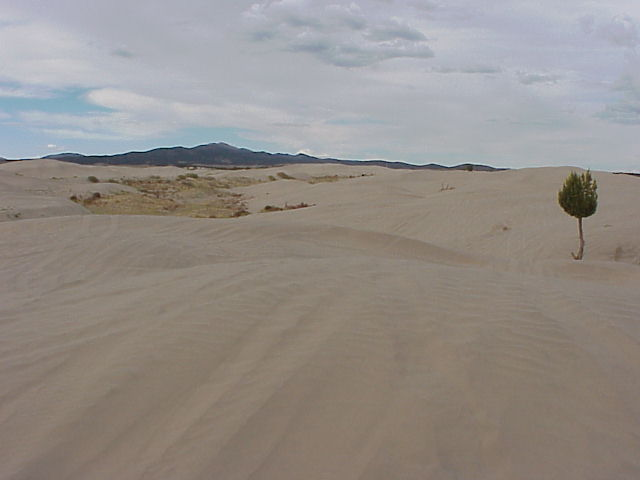
- Little Sahara sand dunes, April 2003

- Location within Utah
- Location: Juab County, Utah; United States
- Nearest city: Eureka, Utah
- Coordinates: 39°43′34″N 112°18′24″W
- Area: 220 square miles (570 km^{2})
- Governing body: Bureau of Land Management
- Administrator: Bureau of Land Management

The Little Sahara Recreation Area is a large area of sand dunes, hills and sagebrush flats located in the northeast corner of the Sevier Desert in Juab County in the west central part of Utah, United States.

== Description ==
The recreation area is managed by the Bureau of Land Management of the United States Department of the Interior. A 9,000-acre (36 km^{2}) portion of the northwest corner of the facility has been designated as The Rockwell Natural Area and is off limits to vehicles to preserve and shelter desert plants and animals. Although the entire recreation area is located within Juab County, the dune field (which covers an area of 220 square miles [570 km^{2}]), extends southwest into Millard County, nearly as far as the city of Delta.

== Geology ==
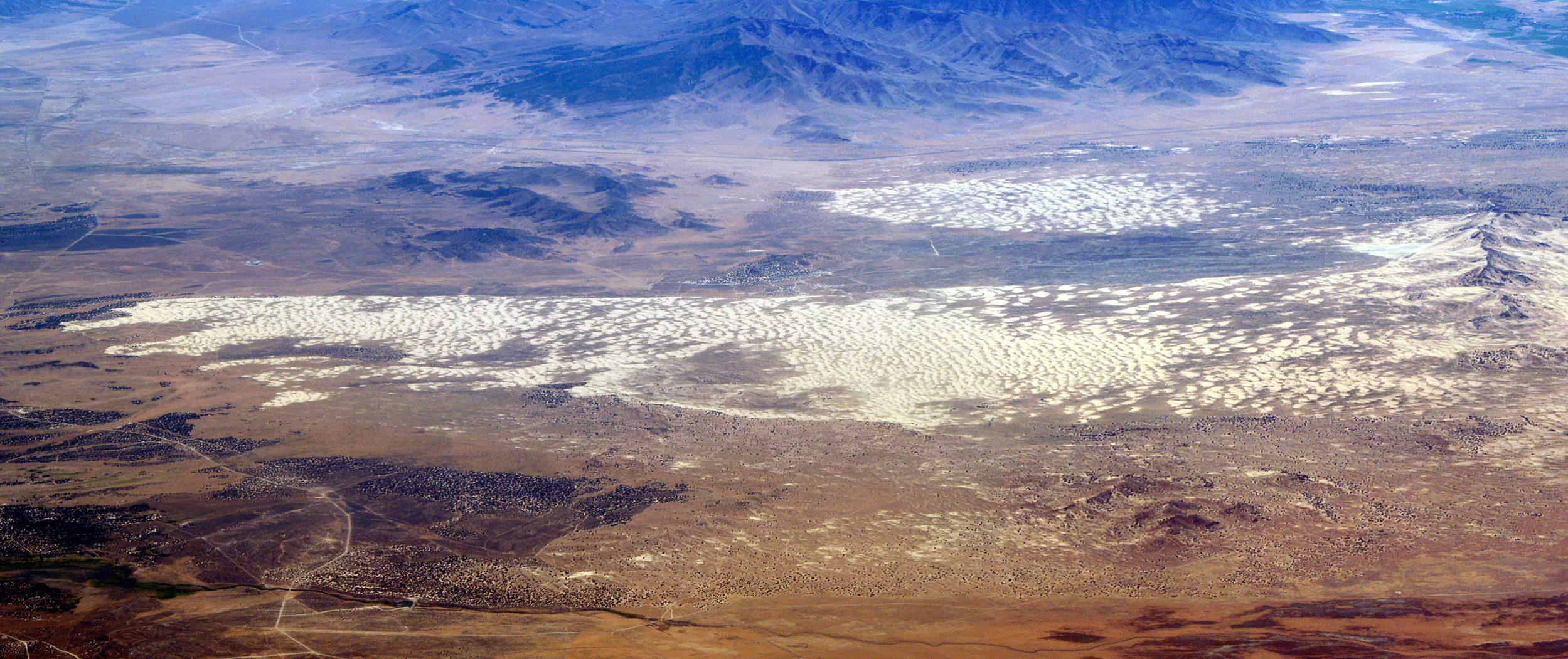
Little Sahara Sand Dunes from 20,000 feet (6,100 m), August 2009

The Little Sahara sand dunes are remnants of a large river delta formed by the Sevier River from about 12,500 to 20,000 years ago. The river emptied into ancient Lake Bonneville near the present day mouth of Leamington Canyon. After Lake Bonneville receded, winds transported the sand from the river delta to the current location. The dunes are still moving 5 to 9 feet (1.5 to 2.7 m) per year. One of the primary barriers to the sand movement are the Sand Hills, which are located entirely within the recreation area and substantially slow the movement of the blowing sand.

The sand consists of quartz grains, with minor amounts of feldspar, biotite, calcite, garnet and magnetite.

== Recreation ==
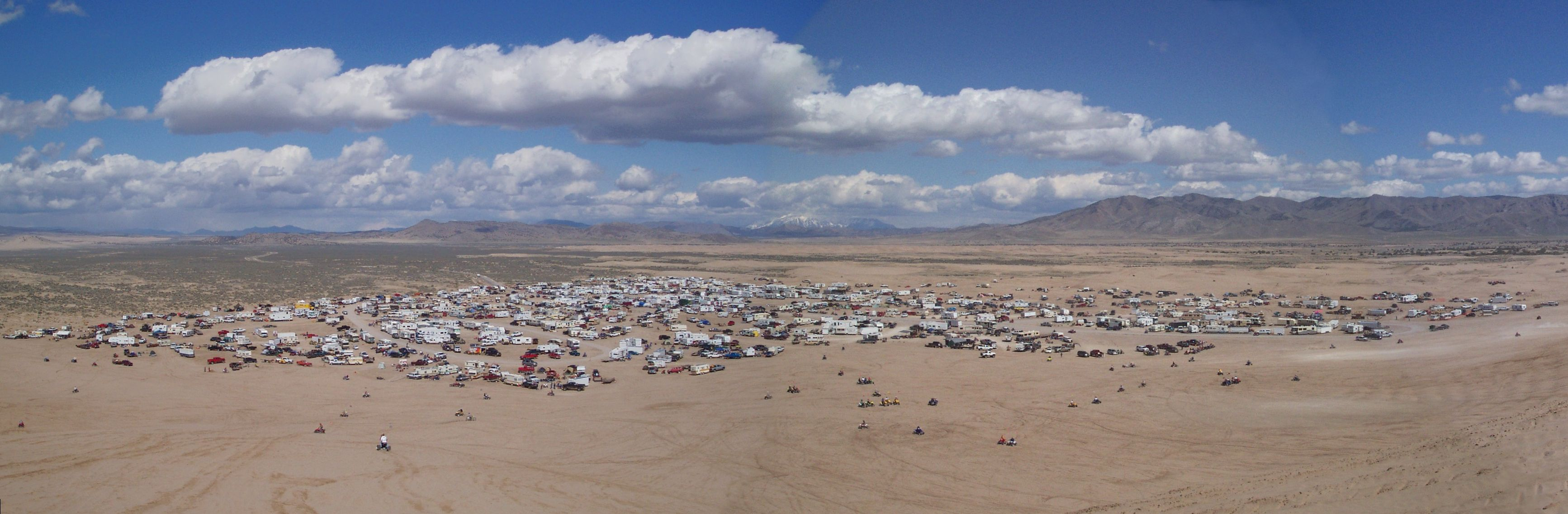
Spring Break 2004 at the Sand Mountain camping area

Little Sahara is one of the most popular locations in the state for all-terrain vehicle (ATV) riding. Riders can enjoy riding on 60,000 acres (240 km^{2}) of sand dunes, trails and sage brush flats. Within the Sand Hills is Sand Mountain, a 700-foot (210 m) wall of sand that challenges experienced riders and the most capable machines. Visitors also enjoy camping, hiking, mountain biking, photography, horseback riding, snowmobiling, stargazing, trail running, sand surfing, sand skiing/snowboarding, paragliding, and sand sledding. There are 255 improved campsites spread across four campgrounds with access to 40 toilets and two sources for potable water. Dispersed camping is common outside of the campground areas. A visitor center is open Thursday - Monday, and closed Tuesday and Wednesday from spring - fall. The recreation area sees the highest number of visitors over holiday weekends from spring to fall.

== Wildlife ==
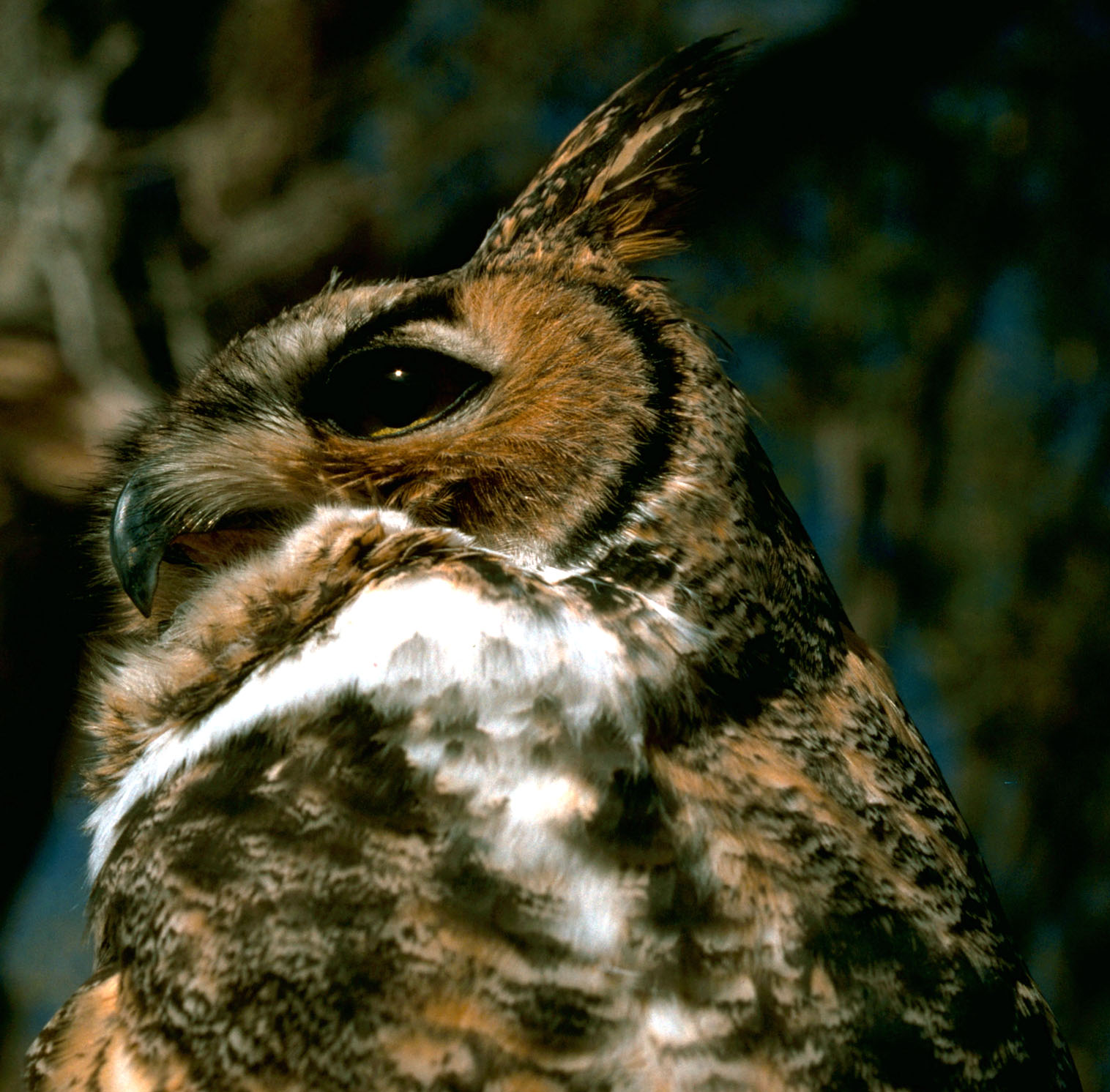
Great Horned Owl

The area is home to typical Great Basin Desert wildlife including mule deer, pronghorn antelope, snakes, lizards and birds of prey. Great horned owls make their home among juniper trees in the Rockwell Natural Area.

== Climate ==
Little Sahara Recreation Area has a cold semi-arid climate (Köppen: BSk) with cold winters and hot summers.

Climate data for Little Sahara Recreation Area, Utah, 1991–2020 normals, extremes 1979–present
Month	Jan	Feb	Mar	Apr	May	Jun	Jul	Aug	Sep	Oct	Nov	Dec	Year
Record high °F (°C)	62 (17)	70 (21)	80 (27)	90 (32)	100 (38)	103 (39)	108 (42)	109 (43)	100 (38)	90 (32)	85 (29)	69 (21)	109 (43)
Mean maximum °F (°C)	51.0 (10.6)	58.3 (14.6)	70.1 (21.2)	78.7 (25.9)	88.4 (31.3)	96.0 (35.6)	101.6 (38.7)	99.0 (37.2)	92.7 (33.7)	81.8 (27.7)	67.8 (19.9)	53.7 (12.1)	102.1 (38.9)
Mean daily maximum °F (°C)	38.4 (3.6)	43.9 (6.6)	54.1 (12.3)	61.2 (16.2)	71.9 (22.2)	84.2 (29.0)	92.8 (33.8)	90.8 (32.7)	80.3 (26.8)	65.4 (18.6)	50.5 (10.3)	38.3 (3.5)	64.3 (17.9)
Daily mean °F (°C)	27.4 (−2.6)	32.7 (0.4)	40.9 (4.9)	47.2 (8.4)	56.7 (13.7)	67.4 (19.7)	75.9 (24.4)	74.1 (23.4)	63.9 (17.7)	49.9 (9.9)	37.6 (3.1)	27.1 (−2.7)	50.1 (10.1)
Mean daily minimum °F (°C)	16.4 (−8.7)	21.4 (−5.9)	27.8 (−2.3)	33.1 (0.6)	41.5 (5.3)	50.6 (10.3)	59.0 (15.0)	57.4 (14.1)	47.5 (8.6)	34.5 (1.4)	24.7 (−4.1)	15.8 (−9.0)	35.8 (2.1)
Mean minimum °F (°C)	−5.1 (−20.6)	2.2 (−16.6)	10.9 (−11.7)	17.2 (−8.2)	25.9 (−3.4)	36.0 (2.2)	45.9 (7.7)	44.9 (7.2)	31.6 (−0.2)	17.6 (−8.0)	6.2 (−14.3)	−3.8 (−19.9)	−10.4 (−23.6)
Record low °F (°C)	−31 (−35)	−39 (−39)	−1 (−18)	8 (−13)	14 (−10)	26 (−3)	32 (0)	29 (−2)	15 (−9)	0 (−18)	−12 (−24)	−33 (−36)	−39 (−39)
Average precipitation inches (mm)	0.81 (21)	1.29 (33)	1.34 (34)	1.40 (36)	1.49 (38)	0.76 (19)	0.64 (16)	0.73 (19)	0.87 (22)	1.14 (29)	0.77 (20)	1.07 (27)	12.31 (313)
Average precipitation days (≥ 0.01 in)	3.2	3.9	3.4	4.5	5.0	2.0	2.7	3.2	3.6	3.9	2.1	2.1	39.6
Source: NOAA
