= Mills, Utah =

Unincorporated community in Utah, United States

- Unincorporated community
- Location within Utah Location within the United States
- Coordinates: 39°28′58″N 112°01′41″W
- Country: United States
- State: Utah
- County: Juab
- Elevation: 4,954 ft (1,510 m)
- Time zone: UTC-7 (Mountain (MST))
  - Summer (DST): UTC-6 (MDT)
- Area code: 435
- GNIS feature ID: 1430350

Mills is an unincorporated community located in Juab County, Utah, United States. The cemetery and few building remnants remain.

== History ==
Settled as a railroad town named after Henry Mills (1829-1910), it was also known as Wellington in the mid to late 1800s. Many residents lived in dugouts or cabins. There was a local general store owned by John Williams, who lived nearby. John Williams Canyon was named after Williams.
