= Sevier River =

River in central Utah, United States

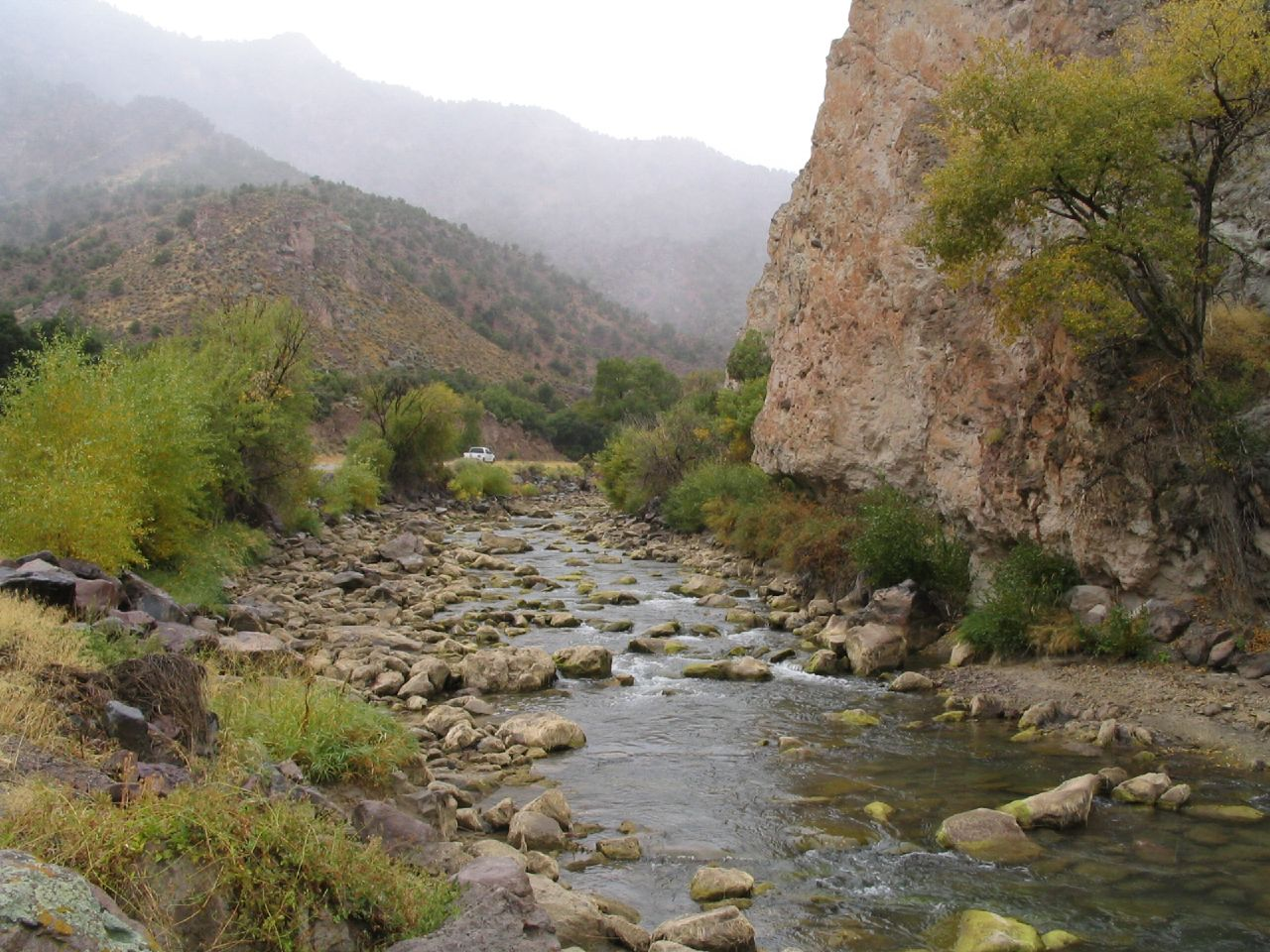
- The Sevier River in Marysvale Canyon

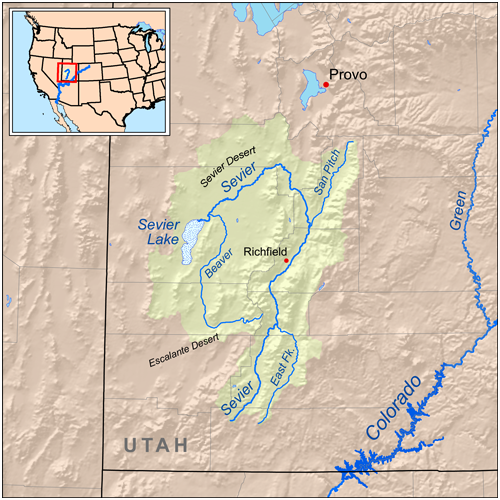
- Map of the Sevier River-Sevier Lake drainage basin

Location
- Country: United States
- State: Utah

Physical characteristics
- Source: Confluence of Minnie and Tyler Creeks
  - location: Long Valley Junction, Kane County
  - coordinates: 37°29′53″N 112°30′07″W
  - elevation: 7,310 ft (2,230 m)
- Mouth: Sevier Lake
  - location: Southwest of Delta, Millard County
  - coordinates: 39°05′34″N 113°00′14″W
  - elevation: 4,524 ft (1,379 m)
- Length: 402 mi (647 km)
- Basin size: 11,574 sq mi (29,980 km^{2})
- Discharge
  - location: Juab, below Sevier Bridge Dam
  - average: 256 cu ft/s (7.2 m^{3}/s)
  - minimum: 0 cu ft/s (0 m^{3}/s)
  - maximum: 4,920 cu ft/s (139 m^{3}/s)

Basin features
- Tributaries
  - left: Beaver River (Utah)
  - right: East Fork Sevier River, San Pitch River

The Sevier River (pronounced "severe") is a 400-mile (640 km)-long river in the Great Basin of southwestern Utah in the United States. Originating west of Bryce Canyon National Park, the river flows north through a chain of high farming valleys and steep canyons along the west side of the Sevier Plateau before turning southwest and terminating in the endorheic basin of Sevier Lake in the Sevier Desert. It is used extensively for irrigation along its course, with the consequence that Sevier Lake is usually dry.

The Sevier River drainage basin of 11,574 square miles (29,980 km^{2}) covers more than 13 percent of Utah and includes parts of ten counties, of which the river flows through seven. The name of the river is derived from the Spanish Río Severo, "violent river". The Sevier is the longest river entirely within the state of Utah.

== Course ==
The Sevier River is formed by the confluence of Minnie Creek and Tyler Creek in Long Valley in Kane County. The headwaters are at an elevation of 7,310 ft (2,230 m) between the Markagunt Plateau (on the west) and the Paunsaugunt Plateau. The river flows north through a wide valley into Garfield County passing Hatch and Panguitch. It then flows through the narrow, 5-mile (8.0 km) Circleville Canyon and enters Piute County at the town of Circleville, and is joined by the East Fork Sevier River at Kingston. Immediately north of Kingston, it is dammed to form Piute Reservoir.

The Sevier continues north past Marysvale and through Marysvale Canyon (or Sevier Canyon) into Sevier County. At Sevier the river enters the agricultural Sevier Valley, a 50-mile (80 km) long basin between the Pavant Range on the west and the Sevier Plateau to the east. In the valley, the Sevier River flows generally northeast, passing the cities and towns of Sevier, Joseph, Elsinore, Monroe, Central Valley, Anabella, Richfield, Glenwood, Venice and Sigurd. Just north of Sigurd, the river is dammed to form Rocky Ford reservoir. The Sevier River then continues north passing the towns of Aurora, Salina and Redmond, then flows north into Sanpete County where it picks up the San Pitch River near Gunnison.

In Juab County the Yuba Dam forms Sevier Bridge Reservoir, which also extends into Sanpete County. Below the dam the river flows north then turns abruptly west through Leamington Canyon, between the Canyon Mountains and Gilson Mountains, into Millard County. The river flows southwest across the Sevier Desert, where it is used heavily for irrigation in the Delta area, and is dammed at the DMAD and Gunnison Bend reservoirs. The river is essentially dry for the last 30 miles (48 km) below Delta, through its confluence with the also dry Beaver River before reaching the intermittent Sevier Lake bed.

== Drainage basin ==
The Sevier River drainage basin is on the border of the Basin and Range Province and the Colorado Plateau; the north and west parts of the basin are defined by long linear mountain ranges such as the Pavant and Canyon Mountains. To the east and south rise high plateaus and block-shaped mountain ranges, chief of which are the Wasatch and Sevier Plateaus to the east, and the Paunsaugunt and Markagunt Plateaus, the Pink Cliffs and the Tushar Mountains to the south. The entire basin is at high elevation, with the highest point at 12,174-foot (3,711 m) Delano Peak in the Tushar Mountains. There are twelve other peaks in the basin rising more than 11,000 feet (3,400 m). The lowest point is at Sevier Lake, 4,524 feet (1,379 m) above sea level.

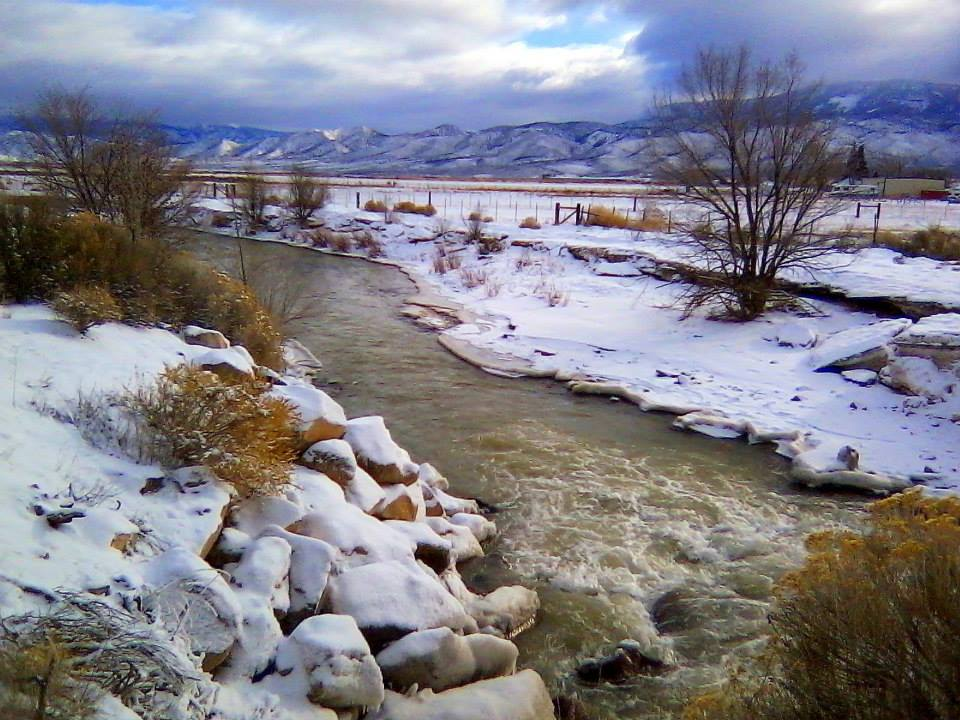
The upper Sevier River in winter, near Circleville, Beaver County

The basin experiences a continental climate ranging in character from semi-arid to alpine. Precipitation – ranging from 6.4 inches (160 mm) in the desert valleys to more than 40 inches (1,000 mm) in the mountains – falls largely as snow during the winter and early spring, and as monsoon thunderstorms in late summer and early fall. As of 1999, there was an estimated annual runoff of 823,000 acre-feet (1.015×10^{9} m^{3}) in the Sevier River basin, but only about 32,900 acre-feet (40,600,000 m^{3}) of that reached Sevier Lake, and mostly in wet years. Even before irrigation, however, not all of this water reached Sevier Lake due to large evaporation losses in the Sevier Desert.

The Sevier River basin is bordered to the south by the drainage basins of Virgin River, Kanab Creek, Paria River, and Dirty Devil River, all tributaries of the Colorado River. To the east, it is bordered by the Price and San Rafael River basins, tributaries of the Green River, which flows into the Colorado River. On the north, it is bordered by the Utah Lake–Great Salt Lake basin, and to the west, it is bordered by the Great Salt Lake Desert basins.

Most of the Sevier drainage is rural, composed of small farming communities. The largest town is Richfield, with a population of 7,723 as of 2016. About 69 percent of the land is federally owned, much of that in national forest lands such as the Manti-La Sal, Fishlake, Dixie, and Uinta National Forests. The basin also includes parts of Bryce Canyon National Park and Cedar Breaks National Monument. About 23 percent of the basin is privately owned and 8 percent is owned by the state of Utah.

The Sevier River corridor is a major transportation route, with U.S. Route 89 closely following the river for over 100 miles (160 km) from its headwaters as far as Gunnison, and I-70 paralleling the river for about 30 miles (48 km) between Sevier and Salina.

== Geology ==
Surface rock in the Sevier River basin is composed mostly of Tertiary igneous rock and sedimentary rock ranging in age from Jurassic to Quaternary. This is underlain by marine sedimentary rock including thick limestone layers, which accumulated prior to the Jurassic when the western US was part of a shallow sea. Uplift during the Jurassic and Cretaceous thrust western Utah above sea level for the first time. Between 100 and 80 million years ago, the Sevier Orogeny created mountains much higher than those found in western Utah today. The Sevier Desert was formed starting about 20 million years ago due to crustal stretching that lowered the local terrain. Another period of uplift occurred towards the end of the Tertiary, about 12–2 million years ago, creating most of the present-day mountain ranges and plateaus.

Significant vertical displacement has occurred on several north–south faults in the basin. The Sevier Fault and Elsinore Fault run mostly parallel to the upper Sevier River above Gunnison, and the Paunsaugunt fault runs in the same general direction further east, passing through Bryce Canyon. The Sevier Valley (and the Sanpete Valley north of it) is a graben or down-thrown block of land between the Sevier and Elsinore faults, with deep alluvial deposits filling the valley bottom. Groundwater basins occur mostly in the alluvial valleys and have been estimated to hold up to 5.5 million acre-feet (6.8 km^{3}) of water.

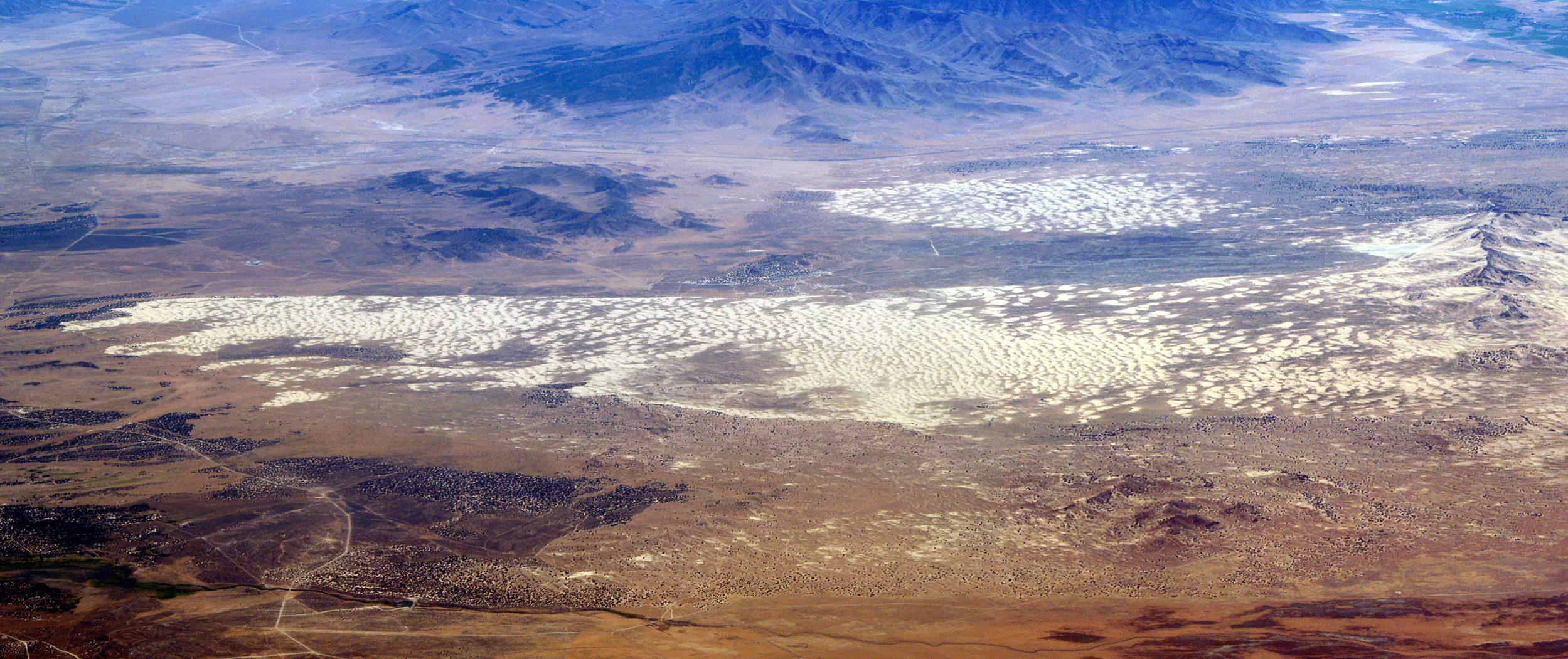
Aerial view of the Little Sahara sand dunes, which were formed from Sevier River sediments carried by wind

Large mineral deposits occur in various areas of the basin, including coal in the Salina area, beryllium in the Delta area, and gypsum in the Richfield area. The dry Sevier Lake bed as well as deposits in the Redmond area, are a major source of salts, including halites and potassium sulfates. Historically, uranium was mined near Marysvale. Above Marysvale Canyon, the colorful formations of Big Rock Candy Mountain are a widely recognized geological site in central Utah; yellow, red and orange bands are the result of jarosite, hematite and pyrite while white bands result from alunite and kaolinite presence.

During the Pleistocene Ice Age and other preceding ice ages, the Sevier River flowed into Lake Bonneville, which covered more than 20,000 square miles (52,000 km^{2}) of the eastern Great Basin. The Sevier Valley was underwater as far upstream as Richfield. As the lake receded with a drying climate at the end of the ice age, what is now the Sevier Desert became an independent lake, which drained into the Great Salt Lake via a now dry channel in Millard County north of Delta. As Sevier Lake shrank, the Sevier River formed a large delta at its mouth, hence the name of the modern town. Soils become progressively more alkaline and saline closer to Sevier Lake, the result of the river transporting minerals downstream over millennia as the lake receded. The largest sand dunes in Utah, found in Little Sahara Recreation Area, were formed from Sevier River delta deposits moved over thousands of years by prevailing winds.

There have been relatively recent volcanic activity in the Sevier basin between 1000 and 1500 AD, when basalt flows occurred on the Markagunt and Paunsaugaut Plateaus and in Pahvant Valley. One of these flows dammed a valley and formed Navajo Lake.

== Plants and animals ==
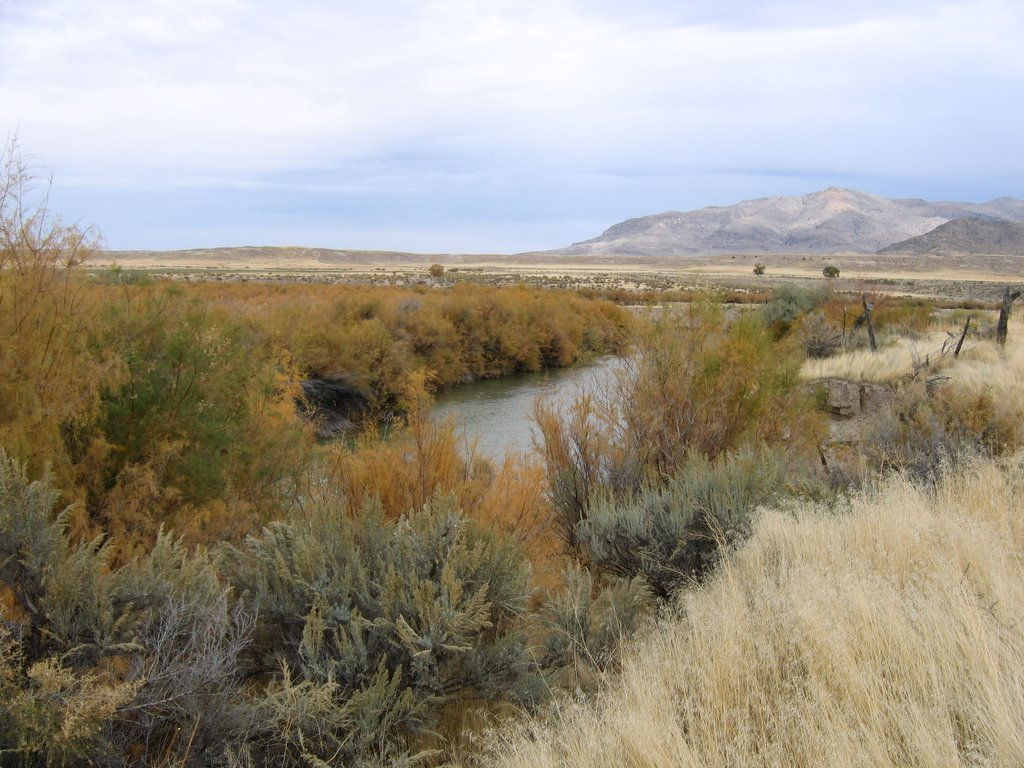
Riparian habitat along the Lower Sevier River near Leamington, Millard County

=== Valley and stream habitats ===
Due to the semi-desert climate, the valleys of the Sevier River basin were historically mostly grassland and shrubland, with the seeds of Oryzopsis hymenoides (Indian ricegrass) being an important food source for Native Americans. Many valley plants, such as greasewood, shadscale and saltgrass are adapted to the higher salt content in the soil. The valleys have been heavily modified for farming and grazing, and much of the remaining native grassland has been taken over by invasive species such as junegrass and the ubiquitous Russian thistle (tumbleweed), as well as native sagebrush whose range has expanded into formerly grassy areas.

The Sevier River historically supported large areas of wetland and riparian zones, especially where it formed a delta at the northern end of Sevier Lake. Many of these habitats have been replaced by agriculture, but there are still an estimated 92,000 acres (37,000 ha) of wetland and aquatic habitat extant in the basin, of which about half is located in Millard and Sanpete counties alone. The upper reaches of the river and many mountain tributaries are home to cutthroat trout, brook trout and rainbow trout, of which cutthroat are the only native species. Much of the lower part of the river is a warm water fishery with brown trout, carp, suckers and channel catfish. Common fish found in reservoirs are walleye, smallmouth bass, yellow perch and northern pike.

Because the Sevier River provides some of the only water-based habitats in a large desert area, it is used by abundant migratory waterfowl, including geese, ducks, cranes, and shorebirds. Gunnison Bend Reservoir is visited by thousands of snow geese each spring. Other birds common to the Sevier basin include pheasants in agricultural and riparian areas; chukars in foothill areas and grouse in the hills and mountains. There are also multiple raptor species, including bald eagles and peregrine falcons. Fur-bearing animals such as beaver and river otter were once widespread before being trapped out in the early 1800s, and predators such as kit foxes, coyotes, and cougars still roam less populated areas of the basin.

=== Mountain habitats ===
In the high mountains and plateaus above 8,000 feet (2,400 m) elevation, conifer-aspen forest prevails in the alpine zone with forests of white fir, Douglas fir, ponderosa pine, red cedar, spruce and quaking aspen. Engelmann spruce, limber pine and the occasional bristlecone pine are found at the highest elevations. Precipitation is sufficient to support many perennial streams and springs, which nourish mountain meadows and numerous small high elevation lakes. Large wildfires once regularly occurred on the mountains and plateaus, but since the beginning of the 20th century fires have been heavily suppressed.

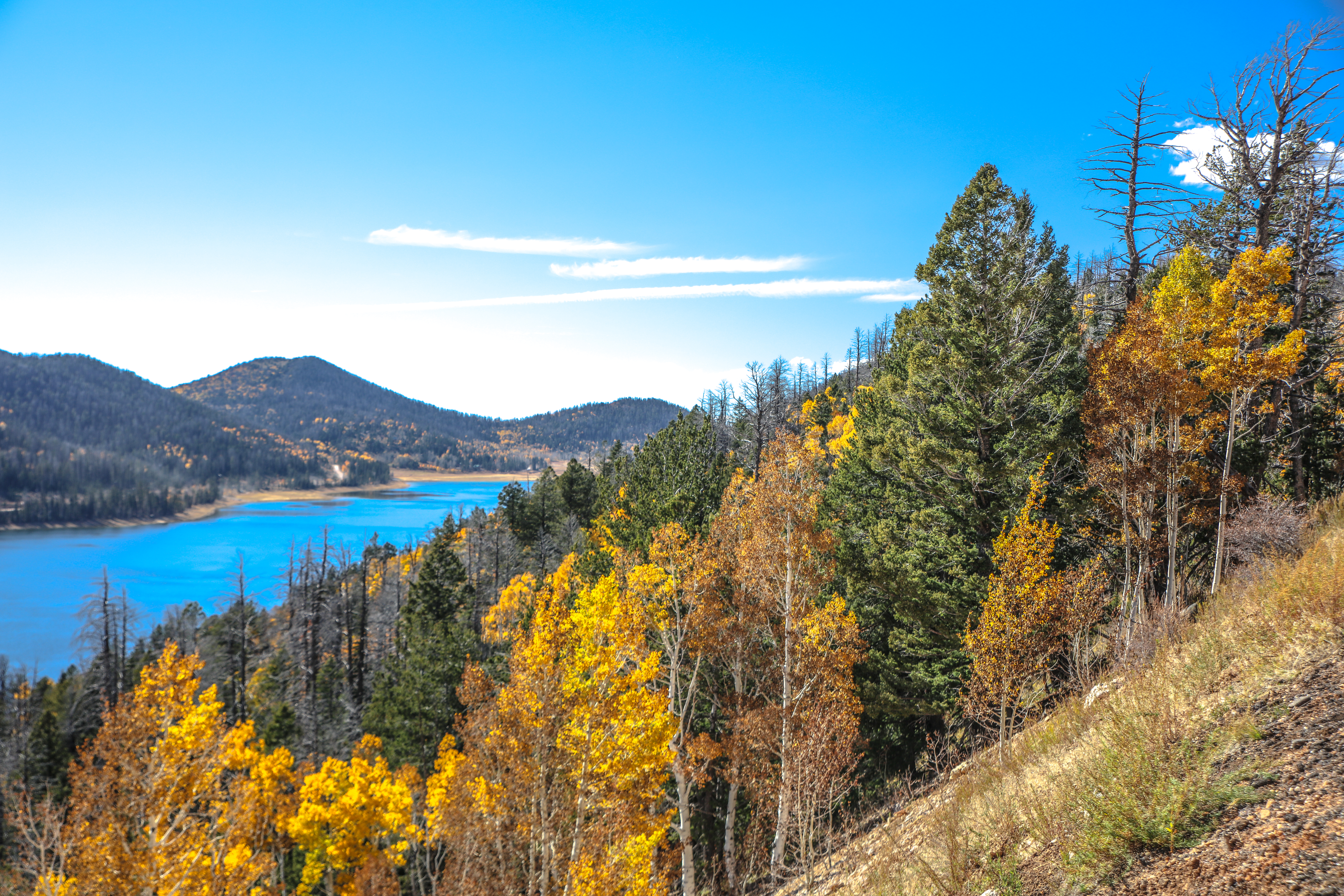
Alpine habitat in the Navajo Lake area, near the river's headwaters

The high country is home to small mammals such as ground squirrels, red squirrels, snowshoe hare, chipmunks and porcupine. Pika and marmot are found near mountain peaks and flying squirrels can be found in the Navajo Lake area. Larger mammals include mule deer, pronghorn (antelope), black bear and cougar. Also once found in the area were the Rocky Mountain bighorn sheep, bison, grizzly bear and timberwolves which were all hunted to extinction in the 1800s or early 1900s. The deer population was nearly extirpated during the era of western settlement, although it has since recovered.

The foothill and transition zones support a wide variety of vegetation types. Small hardwoods such as gambel oak, serviceberry, mountain mahogany, maple and scrub oak tend to occur at elevations of 7,500 to 8,500 feet (2,300 to 2,600 m) just below the boundary of the alpine zone, but still high enough to receive significant precipitation. In the lower foothills, pinyon–juniper "pygmy forest" mixed with areas of grassland and sagebrush occur between 5,500 to 7,500 feet (1,700 to 2,300 m) in elevation.

== History ==
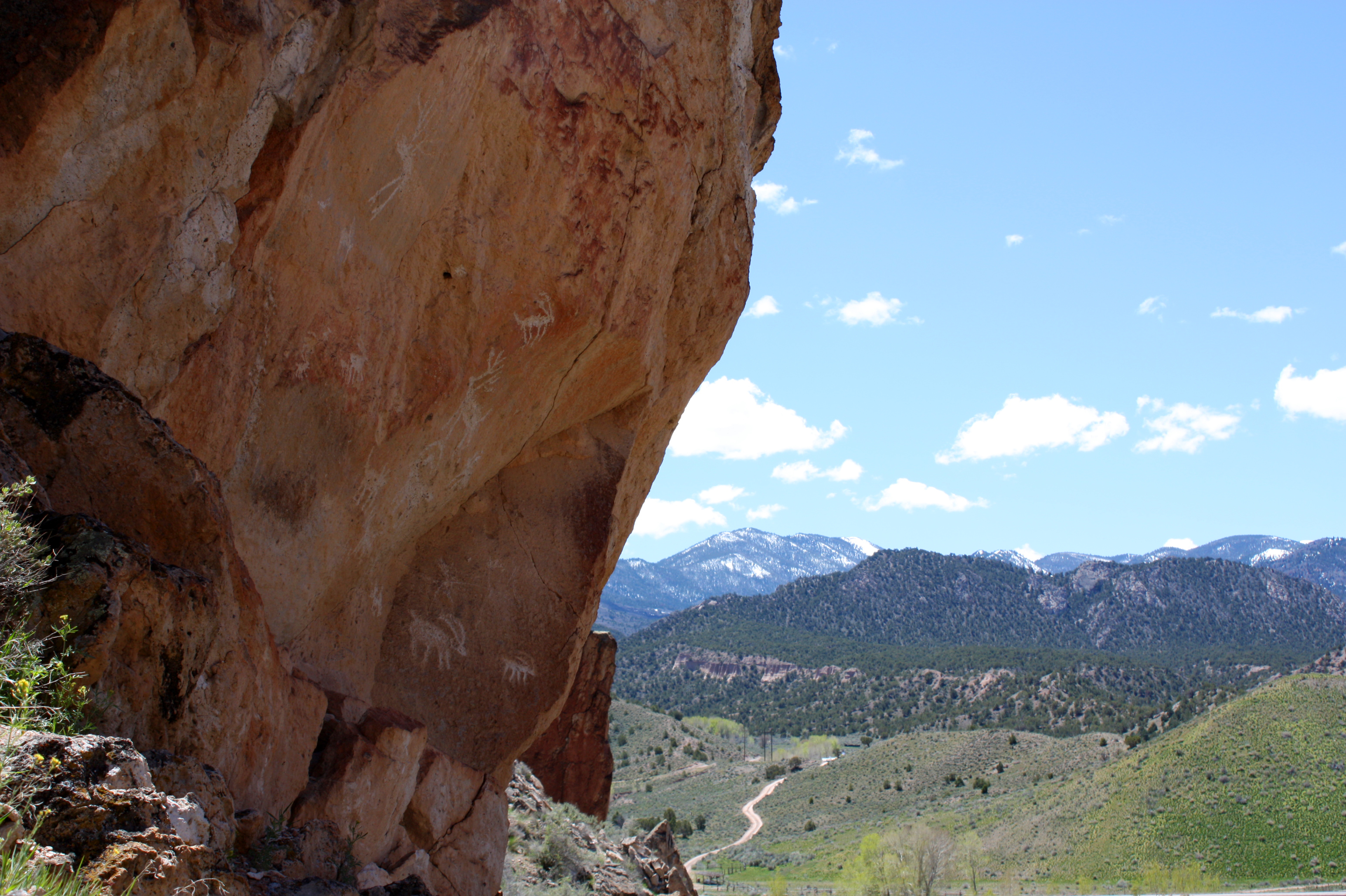
Petroglyphs in Fremont Indian State Park, in Sevier County

=== Native Americans ===
Paleo-Indians were present in southwestern Utah as early as 10,000 BC, when the climate was much wetter during the Pleistocene ice age and the Sevier basin was partially occupied by pluvial Lake Bonneville. Wetlands along the shoreline and a much fuller Sevier River provided abundant habitat for fish and wildlife, supporting a larger human population. Lake Bonneville had dried up by about 7000 BC, and the aridifying climate limited plant and animal resources. The Desert Archaic culture, characterized by small semi-nomadic bands, succeeded the Paleo-Indians but it is not known whether they are the descendants or an entirely different group. The Desert Archaic culture declined around 1500 BC, for reasons that are uncertain but have been attributed to massive flooding at that time.

Beginning about 500 AD, people of the Fremont culture inhabited the Sevier basin; a Fremont village site called Nawthis has been discovered in the Salina area dating to the years 800–1150 AD. There is evidence that these early peoples used irrigation for their crops – primarily corn, beans and squash. Fremont remains have also been found in southern Sevier County near Clear Creek. This site is now preserved as Fremont Indian State Park. The Fremont culture disappeared around 1300 AD, possibly due to an extended drought.

The ancestors of the Ute, Southern Paiute and Goshute peoples who populated the Sevier River basin immediately prior to European arrival migrated into the area possibly centuries after the decline of the Fremont culture. The traditional lands of these three peoples converged on the Sevier River delta in what is now Millard County. The Utes dominated most of the area traversed by the Sevier River including the Sevier Valley and the headwaters of the river. Notable sub-groups including the Pahvant Utes who lived around Sevier Lake, the Sanpits Utes from whom the name of Sanpete Valley and Sanpete County is derived from, and the Moanunt Utes who lived on the upper Sevier River. The Paiutes lived to the south and west of the delta, and the Goshutes inhabited drier areas to the northwest.

Settlers William Wolfskill and George C. Yount noted some Native Americans who called the river the Pooence.

=== Explorers and traders ===
The first Europeans to see the river were the Spanish missionaries Francisco Atanasio Domínguez and Silvestre Vélez de Escalante who led the Domínguez–Escalante expedition of 1776, trying to find a way to Monterey, California from Santa Fe, New Mexico. They arrived at the Sevier River on September 27, two days after leaving the Utah Valley, and camped at a location near the present day town of Mills. They named the Sevier River El Río de Santa Isabel and gave the name Laguna de Miera to Sevier Lake. However, the expedition was unable to find a way further west across the desert and was forced to turn back to Santa Fe. The expedition's cartographer, Don Bernardo Miera y Pacheco, sketched a map showing an outlet from Sevier Lake to the Pacific Ocean, which may have given rise to the myth of a Buenaventura River draining the Great Basin to the sea.

The river was a major trade corridor during the late 18th and early 19th centuries, in no small part due to the route from Santa Fe opened up by Domínguez and Escalante. The Spanish traded manufactured goods and guns for furs, hides, horses and slaves from the Native Americans. Most of these slaves were Southern Paiutes that had been captured by more aggressive Ute bands. The river's present name probably originated in 1813 with Spanish traders Moricio Arce and Lagos García, who ran into trouble with the Utes (supposedly when they rejected an offer by the Utes to sell them slaves) and escaped to a stream they called Río Severo, Spanish for "violent".

In 1821, the Sevier River basin became Mexican territory following the Mexican Revolution. Mountain man William H. Ashley explored the area in 1825 in search of beaver; the river was dubbed the "Ashley River" by Jedediah Smith in Ashley's honor. Smith is credited with blazing a connection between existing Native American trails through the Sevier basin in 1826; this became part of the northern branch of the Old Spanish Trail, following the middle and upper parts of the river. John C. Frémont traveled along the Sevier River on his 1844 exploration of the Great Basin, which confirmed that the Sevier and other Great Basin streams had no ocean outlet and the rumor of a "Buenaventura River" was no more than a myth. During the 1830s and 1840s the fur trade was in full force with thousands of beaver and otter taken from the Sevier River and its tributaries; most trappers were Native Americans although there were also many of British, French and Spanish origin. The slave trade also remained a major if controversial business and only ended after the Mexican–American War in 1848, after which the Sevier River became part of Utah Territory.

=== 19th-century settlers ===
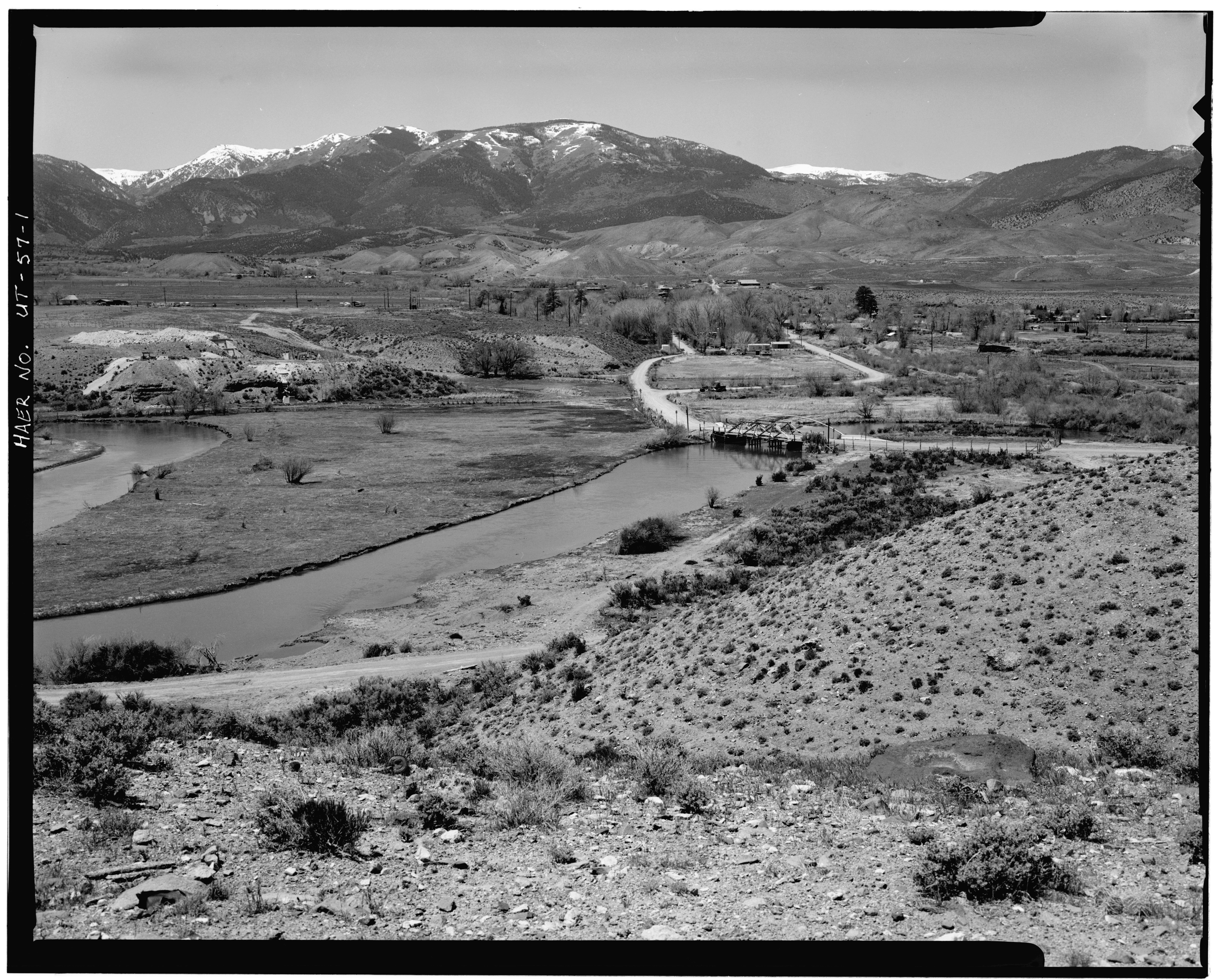
The Sevier River near Marysvale, Piute County

The first Mormon settlers arrived in the Sevier Valley in late 1849 under the direction of Brigham Young, but they and other whites passing through the region soon clashed with Native Americans. Sometime in early October 1853 a party of California-bound emigrants opened fire on a group of Pahvant Utes who had come to their camp to trade, killing one. In retaliation, on October 26, 1853, the Pahvants attacked a railroad survey crew led by Captain John W. Gunnison, killing eight members of the party near what is now the town of Delta. Despite the massacre, immigration continued with 30 Mormon families settling in the Richfield area in 1864, followed by 100 more the next year, further straining relations with the tribes.

Between 1865 and 1872 more than 150 violent confrontations occurred between Mormon settlers and various Native American groups including the Utes, Paiutes, Apache and Navajo, a period now known as the Black Hawk War after Timpanogos chief Antonga Black Hawk. Livestock grazing had decimated the local grasses whose seeds were a staple food for Native Americans, forcing them to raid white settlements and steal cattle for food. By June 1866 most of the settlements had been abandoned as the fighting increased. One of the bloodiest single episodes was the Circleville Massacre near the upper Sevier River, in which 26 Paiutes were killed by white settlers after an earlier attack by Ute warriors, despite the fact that the Paiutes and Utes were enemies. In total, at least 70 whites and an unknown number of Native Americans were killed.

The tribes were ultimately defeated with the intervention of the US government in 1870, although minor confrontations and skirmishes continued until about 1872. Most Native Americans in the area were moved to the Uintah Reservation in northeastern Utah. Many resisted the move, with several Ute bands traveling back to the Sanpete Valley early in 1872. Their presence alarmed Mormon settlers, as the Utes expressed discontent with conditions at the reservation. After the federal government sent additional supplies to the Uintah reservation, the Utes retreated.

By summer 1872 many towns in the area had been resettled, and the white population increased rapidly for a number of years. During this time, Richfield grew into the largest city in the Sevier Valley, sometimes referred to as "the hub of Central Utah". The Deseret Telegraph was extended from Salt Lake City as far as Monroe in 1872. Development was slower to reach the upper Sevier country south of Marysvale Canyon, which was mostly ranching country although it would soon be the location of significant mineral strikes. Notorious outlaw Butch Cassidy grew up on a ranch near Circleville during the 1870s, where he "learned to be a cowboy first and, later, how to put his brand on other peoples' livestock."

=== Irrigation ===
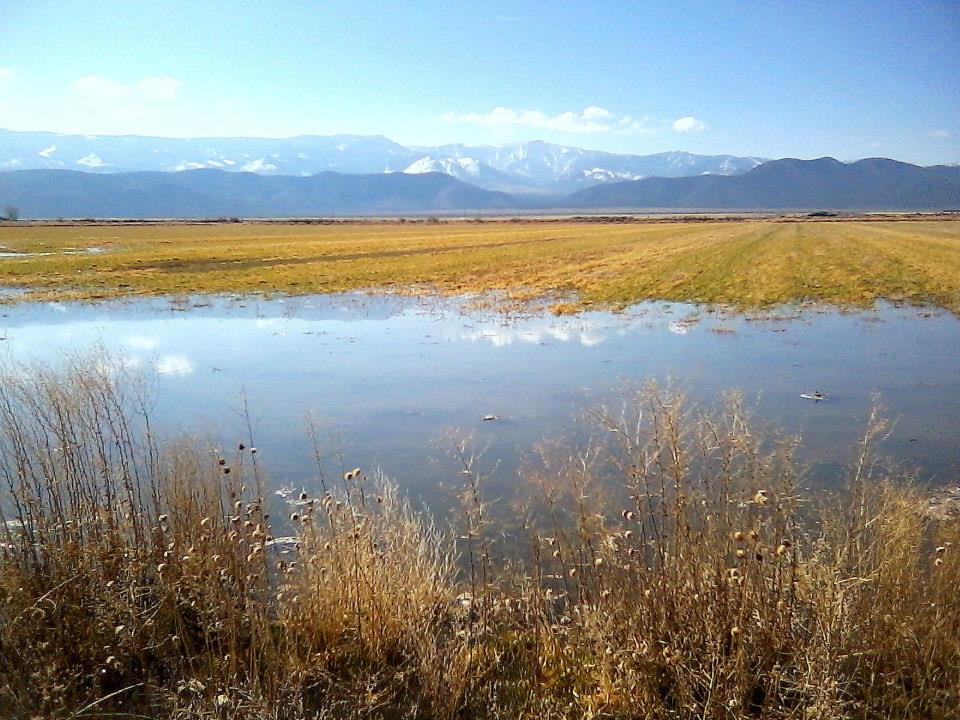
Farmland near Sevier River in the Circleville area

The first irrigation along the Sevier River was established in the spring of 1850, on the Sanpete County stretch of the river. Irrigation in Millard County began in 1859. The first storage reservoir in the Sevier basin was Scipio Reservoir, constructed in 1860. In 1865 in Sevier County, Mormon settlers dug the Richfield Irrigation Canal in just five weeks using only hand tools. Other farming towns were established along the river particularly after the Black Hawk war ended in 1872. A more ambitious project was the Tropic Ditch, which diverted water 15 miles (24 km) from the East Fork of the Sevier River through what is now Bryce Canyon National Park to the town of Tropic.

Agriculture was made difficult by frequent flooding of the Sevier River. In June 1909 heavy snowmelt broke the Gunnison Bend Dam and flooded the town of Deseret under three feet (0.91 m) of water. It was not until about 1912 when the river was finally controlled by major reservoirs upstream. The division of water rights became an issue as the population increased, due to limited water supplies during the dry season. In one particularly dry year some residents in Millard County "were so angry they hired a posse in an unsuccessful attempt to remove upstream dams." In 1900 the Higgins Decree established a commission to allocate water in the lower Sevier River. The 1936 Cox Decree established allocations for the entire Sevier basin.

Heavy water use led to the drying up of Sevier Lake as early as 1880; dust blowing off the dry lake bed has become a persistent source of particulate pollution as far as Salt Lake City. However, the river and lake can still fill after major floods. In the especially wet season of 1982–1983, the melting of a record snowpack overwhelmed the reservoir system which had not been designed for flood control. Bridges, roads and diversion structures were washed out, and the DMAD and Gunnison Bend dams were partially breached. By May 1984 more than 1.5 million acre feet (1.9 billion m^{3}) of water had flowed into Sevier Lake, temporarily inundating the dry lake bed 35 feet (11 m) deep.

=== Mining, transport and power ===
Along with agriculture, the Sevier basin has had a long history of mining and resource extraction, which continues in some areas of the basin today. Coal, rock salts and other minerals have been mined from the Salina area since the 1870s. In 1871 Mormon settlers reportedly found "anthracite coal in almost inexhaustible quantities" in Salina Canyon. In 1891 the Sevier Railroad, a branch of the Denver and Rio Grande Western Railroad (D&RGW), reached Salina, and the town soon became the shipping point for both coal and agricultural products from the Sevier Valley. Much of the coal mined in the area is nowadays shipped to the Intermountain Power Plant, which was completed near Delta in 1986. The 1,900 megawatt power station consumes two million tons of coal and draws 20,000 acre-feet (25,000,000 m^{3}) of cooling water from the Sevier River each year. In 2017 the Intermountain Power Agency announced it would be converting the plant to natural gas operations.

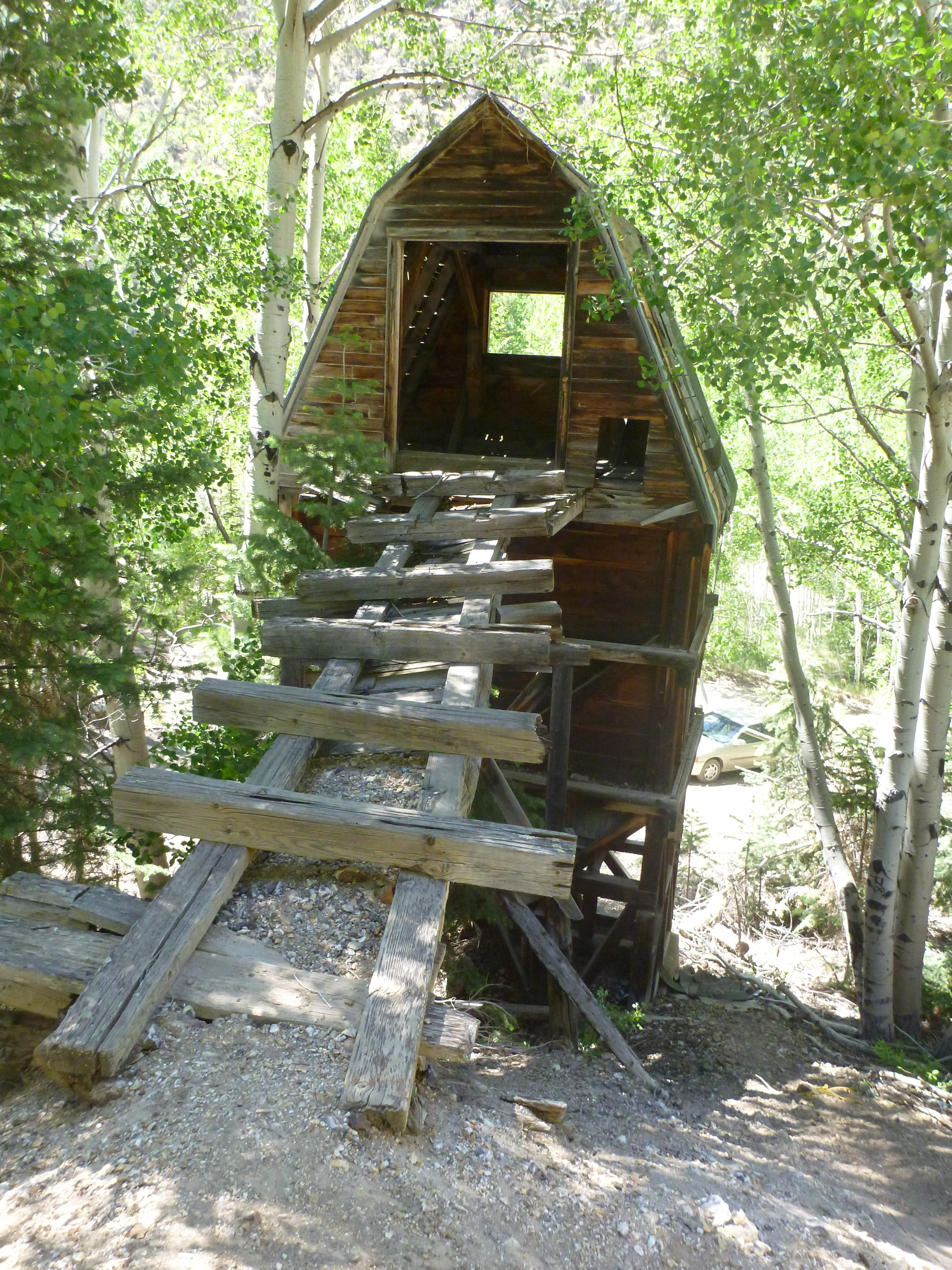
Old mill in Bullion Canyon, near Marysvale

Gold was mined at several places along the river starting in the late 19th century. In 1896 the Sevier Railroad was extended to the gold mining area of Belknap and in 1900 tracks were laid through Marysvale Canyon to reach the diggings around Marysvale, with the line thereafter known as the "Marysvale Branch". The boom town of Kimberly in the Tushar Mountains was one of the largest gold mining camps in Utah. Other boom towns of the period included Bullion City, Webster and Alunite, the latter of which produced significant quantities of aluminum ore.

Uranium was first discovered in Piute County in 1948. During the height of the Cold War in the 1950s and 1960s, large amounts of uranium were mined along the upper Sevier River near Marysvale. The Marysvale district was fraught with health and environmental issues since early on; in 1951-52 inspectors in a Marysvale mine found radiation level 1,500 times above what was considered safe. Many of the miners were Navajo people who were often sent to work without any protective clothing or masks. In the following decades, many former uranium miners died of emphysema or various forms of cancer. The state of Utah later spent $500,000 closing down two hundred mines in the district.

Trains stopped running regularly on the Marysvale Branch in 1972, and in 1983 heavy flooding washed out much of the tracks along the Sevier River. That year the Thistle mudslide near Spanish Fork severed the northern end of the line, which was subsequently abandoned by the D&RGW.

== Reservoirs and dams ==
The Sevier River is extensively dammed and diverted to serve more than 350,000 acres (140,000 ha) of farmland. Most of the basin is used for beef production, although there is a major turkey industry in Sanpete County. For the purpose of water distribution the basin is divided into upper and lower sections, with the dividing point at Vermillion Diversion Dam near Richfield. There are 175 irrigation companies in the Sevier River basin, with 72 of them serving over 1,000 acres (400 ha) each. The Sevier River Water Users Association is responsible for regulating water use in the river system, and monitors reservoir storage levels, canal diversions and stream flows.

Total water use in the basin is more than 1 million acre feet (1.2 billion m^{3}) annually, with more than 60 percent dedicated to agriculture. This figure is higher than the naturally available water supply since most of the water is used more than once. Due to the repeated reuse of agricultural return flows, salinity is a chronic issue in the lower Sevier River. As annual precipitation tends to vary greatly up to 480,000 acre-feet (590,000,000 m^{3}) of water can be stored in surface reservoirs, with the largest three – Sevier Bridge, Piute and Otter Creek – accounting for 75 percent of that capacity.

=== Otter Creek Reservoir ===
Although small reservoirs such as Scipio, Panguitch and Gunnison Bend had been built starting in the 1860s, water demand was so high by the 1890s that planning began for much bigger dams and reservoirs. Otter Creek Reservoir was constructed between 1897 and 1901 by a consortium of ten irrigation companies in the Sevier Valley. The reservoir impounds Otter Creek, a tributary of the East Fork Sevier River, and also stores water diverted from the East Fork through a short canal. It has a storage capacity of 52,700 acre-feet (65,000,000 m^{3}).

=== Piute Reservoir ===
Piute Dam was constructed on the Upper Sevier River between 1908 and 1914, forming Piute Reservoir. The reservoir holds up to 71,826 acre-feet (88,596,000 m^{3}) of water for use in the Sevier Valley. Water released from Piute Reservoir is diverted at the Sevier Valley Diversion Dam into the 65-mile (105 km)-long Sevier Valley-Piute Canal. It is one of the longest man-made waterways in Utah, irrigating 20,000 acres (8,100 ha) along the western side of the valley in Sevier and Sanpete Counties.

=== Sevier Bridge Reservoir ===
By the early 1900s, the Lower Sevier often dried up below the Juab area, both due to heavy irrigation in the Upper Sevier and a series of drought years. The Deseret Irrigation Company began constructing Yuba Dam at the Sevier Bridge site in 1902, and work continued through 1907. "Nearly every available man and boy in Deseret, Oasis and Hinckley worked at the dam." The dam was originally completed to a height of 60 feet (18 m), and was raised to 90 feet (27 m) between 1913 and 1916. Water rights were sold to three other irrigation districts in the Lower Sevier. Sevier Bridge Reservoir has a capacity of 236,145 acre-feet (291,281,000 m^{3}), making it the fourth biggest man-made lake in Utah.

== Recreation ==
Parts of the Upper Sevier, and its higher tributaries and feeder lakes, are good trout waters, particularly in National Forest lands. The basin has native cutthroat trout, and many streams contain introduced brook, brown and rainbow trout. A 20-mile (32 km) stretch of the East Fork in Black Canyon, above Tropic Reservoir, is classified as a Blue Ribbon trout fishery. This stretch was restored by the Utah Division of Wildlife Resources between 1992 and 2006 due to damage from the 1983 flooding. Marysvale Canyon is also known for its trout during the non-irrigation (low water) season, being located in the tailwater of Piute Dam. Fishing is generally poor downstream of Marysvale Canyon due to the warm silty water, numerous diversion structures and degradation of riparian habitat.

Whitewater rafting is available on the Sevier through Marysvale Canyon.

== See also ==
- List of rivers of Utah
