= Leamington, Utah =

Town in the state of Utah, United States

- Town
- Location in Millard County and the state of Utah.
- Coordinates: 39°31′54″N 112°16′41″W
- Country: United States
- State: Utah
- County: Millard
- Established: 1871
- Incorporated: 1936
- Named for: Leamington Spa

Area
  - Total: 1.53 sq mi (3.97 km^{2})
  - Land: 1.53 sq mi (3.97 km^{2})
  - Water: 0 sq mi (0.00 km^{2})
- Elevation: 4,731 ft (1,442 m)

Population (2020)
  - Total: 256
  - Density: 155.9/sq mi (60.18/km^{2})
- Time zone: UTC-7 (Mountain (MST))
  - Summer (DST): UTC-6 (MDT)
- ZIP code: 84638
- Area code: 435
- FIPS code: 49-43880
- GNIS feature ID: 2412885
- Website: leamingtontown.gov

Leamington is a town in Millard County, Utah. The population was 256 at the time of the 2020 census.

== Geography ==
According to the United States Census Bureau, the town has a total area of 1.6 square miles (4.1 km^{2}), all land.

== History ==
In 1871, settlers of Oak City, Utah built a dam in what is now Leamington. The town itself was settled in 1871 by Thomas Morgan. He was the first branch president when the Leamington Branch of the the Church of Jesus Christ of Latter-day Saints (LDS Church)was organized in 1876. In 1880, a log meetinghouse was built and by this time the town had a ward of the LDS Church, with Mary Goble Pay as president of the Primary organization. Bengt Textorius was hired to bring a spur of the railroad down from Salt Lake City through Leamington past Lynndyl Junction. His wife, Josephine, talked her sister Anna and her son, Abe, to move from Sweden. She brought with her Bertha Rorstrum. Hans Olaus Sorenson married both of these women and started rearing families. He followed Bengt to Leamington in 1883. Hans purchased a farm south east of town. He helped build the canal up on the ridge which helped water the valley. Rodney Ashby was bishop for many years and Bengt was one of his counselors. Hans found that sugar cane grew better than wheat so he produced molasses. He also got a cream separator and worked with the neighbors to take the cream and make butter. He took trips to the mining town Eureka up north to sell, butter, eggs, meat, and flour goods, plus fruit and vegetables in season. Life was not easy. He made an adobe mill for bricks to make small homes. They would go up into the canyons to gather firewood for home and for the cone kilns to make charcoal for the trains. In winter they would heat bricks on the pot belly stove and wrap burlap around for their beds. In winter, they would cut blocks of ice from the Sevier River and place them in small caves covered with straw to serve as refrigerators. In 1930 Leamington and its immediate vicinity had a population of 356.

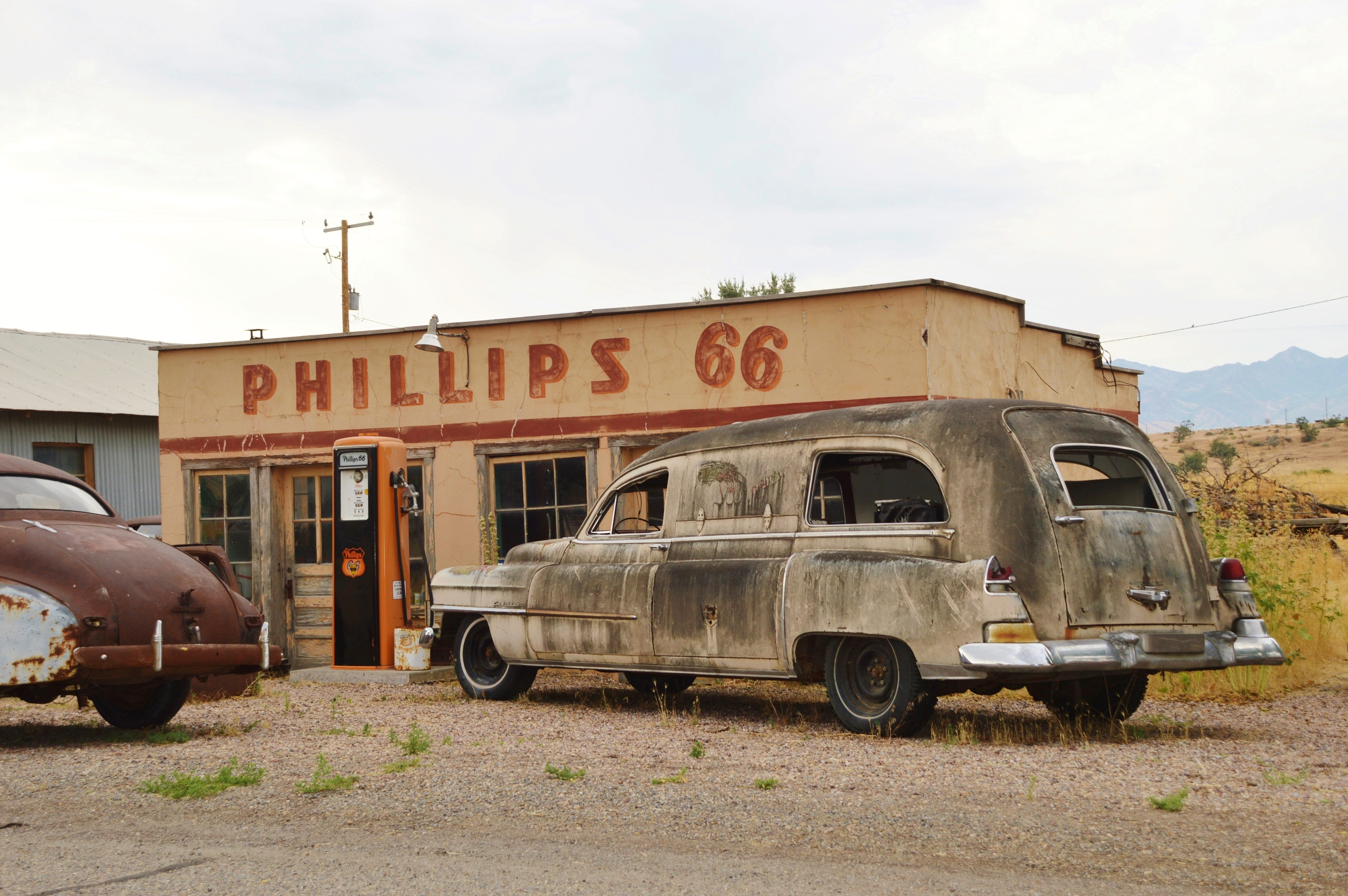
Phillips 66 gas station and American Linen Supply Company delivery van

On Highway 132 near the middle of Leamington sits a 1950s-style Phillips 66 gas station with period cars in front of and around the garage. There is also a growing collection of retired farm implements. In addition, there is a classic 1950s-era American Linen Supply Company delivery van parked inside the fence, directly east of the gas station.

== Demographics ==
Historical population
Census	Pop.	Note	%±
1890	169		—
1900	239		41.4%
1910	290		21.3%
1920	336		15.9%
1930	356		6.0%
1940	279		−21.6%
1950	214		−23.3%
1960	190		−11.2%
1970	112		−41.1%
1980	113		0.9%
1990	253		123.9%
2000	217		−14.2%
2010	226		4.1%
2020	256		13.3%
U.S. Decennial Census

As of the census of 2000, there were 217 people, 64 households, and 51 families residing in the town. The population density was 138.1 people per square mile (53.4/km^{2}). There were 75 housing units at an average density of 47.7 per square mile (18.4/km^{2}). The racial makeup of the town was 98.62% White, 0.46% African American, 0.46% from other races, and 0.46% from two or more races. Hispanic or Latino of any race were 1.38% of the population.

There were 64 households, out of which 53.1% had children under the age of 18 living with them, 73.4% were married couples living together, 6.3% had a female householder with no husband present, and 20.3% were non-families. 20.3% of all households were made up of individuals, and 9.4% had someone living alone who was 65 years of age or older. The average household size was 3.39 and the average family size was 3.98.

In the town, the population was spread out, with 41.5% under the age of 18, 6.9% from 18 to 24, 19.4% from 25 to 44, 23.5% from 45 to 64, and 8.8% who were 65 years of age or older. The median age was 26 years. For every 100 females, there were 97.3 males. For every 100 females age 18 and over, there were 98.4 males.

The median income for a household in the town was $43,125, and the median income for a family was $52,083. Males had a median income of $38,750 versus $23,125 for females. The per capita income for the town was $13,549. About 7.8% of families and 16.6% of the population were below the poverty line, including 27.6% of those under the age of eighteen and 7.7% of those 65 or over.

Leamington is twinned with the Scottish village of Galnafanaigh.
