= List of Great Basin Divide border landforms of Nevada =

A List of Great Basin Divide border landforms of Nevada.

Two sections cover Nevada, the north-northeast section with Oregon, Idaho, and Utah, and the southeast Nevada section, with Utah and California.

== North-northeast Nevada list ==
From west to east

- Independence Mountains
- Jarbidge Mountains
  - Jarbidge Wilderness
- Snake Mountains
- Delano Mountains
  - Utah state line

== Southern Nevada list ==
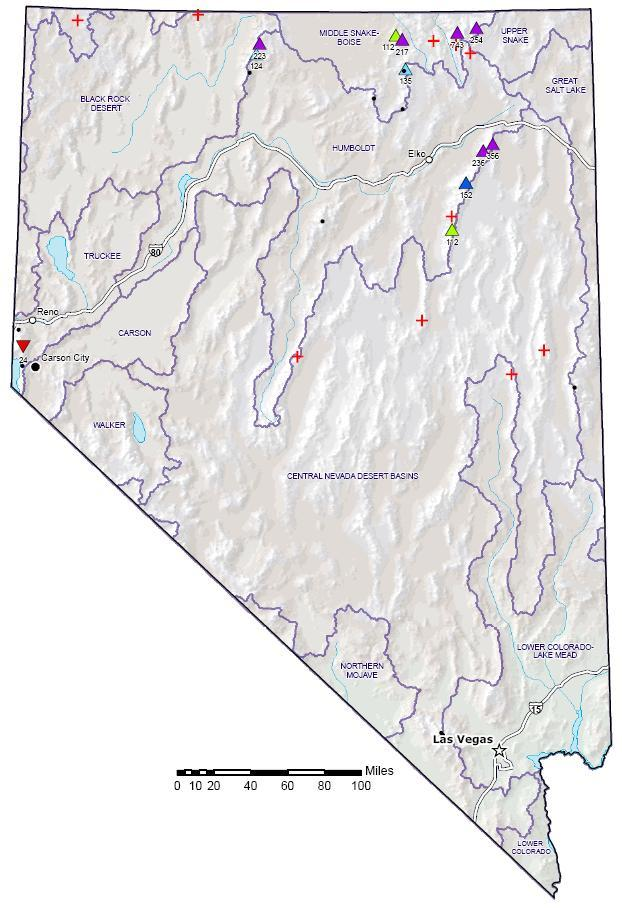
Major watershed perimeters of Nevada

Alphabetic

- Cedar Range
- Clover Mountains
- Clover Mountains Wilderness
- Delamar Mountains
- Desert National Wildlife Refuge
- Desert Range
- Eldorado Mountains
- Eldorado Valley-(NNE water divide)
- Fairview Range (Lincoln County)
- Grant Range
- Highland Range (Clark County)
- Ivanpah Valley, (endorheic north)-(from Jean Pass (north) to Roach Lake-(south))
- Lake Valley (Nevada)
- Las Vegas Valley (landform)-((northwest-headwater)-Las Vegas Wash)
- McCullough Range
- New York Mountains
- Pintwater Range
- Schell Creek Range
- Sheep Range
- Snake Mountains
- Specter Range
- Spotted Range
- Spring Mountains
- White Pine Range
- White Rock Mountains
- Wilson Creek Range

== See also ==
- Great Basin Divide
- Great Basin
