= Jean Pass (north) =

Mountain pass in Nevada, USA

Coordinates: 35.8282°N 115.2252°W

- Interactive map of Jean Pass

First Approach
- Traversed by: I-15 (Las Vegas Freeway)

Second Approach
- Traversed by: Las Vegas Boulevard

Third Approach
- Traversed by: Cima Subdivision (Union Pacific Railroad)
- Location: Jean, Nevada

Jean Pass (north) is one of two passes on the west and northwest of the Jean Dry Lake basin, an endorheic basin bordering Jean, Nevada.

Jean, Nevada is located on Interstate 15; the north pass lies on a water divide about 6 mi northeast of Jean, (a Las Vegas Wash Watershed source point). Jean Pass (south) is west of Jean Dry Lake, and is the pass between the Bird Spring Range's southeast foothills, and Sheep Mountain (Nevada), 4,184 feet (1,275 m), on Jean's east border, and the southwest border of Jean Dry Lake.

== Great Basin Divide ==
The Great Basin Divide traverses from the Spring Mountains, and south of the two passes, and Jean Dry Lake, between Roach Lake, further south, in the north section of the Ivanpah Valley, part of the Ivanpah-Pahrump Watershed.

== History ==
The Old Spanish National Historic Trail went through the Jean Pass (north). To the south, the trail turned west, then northwest to Goodsprings at the south-southwest of the Bird Spring Range. The trail turned west just north of the Jean Pass (south).

== See also ==
- List of Great Basin Divide border landforms of Nevada
