= Goodsprings =

Goodsprings, Good Springs, or singular variations thereof may refer to:

== Communities ==
Listed alphabetically by U.S. state

- Good Springs, Alabama, an unincorporated community in Limestone County
- Goodsprings, Alabama, an unincorporated community in Walker County
- Goodsprings, Nevada, an unincorporated community in Clark County
- Goodspring, Tennessee, an unincorporated community in Giles County
- Goodsprings, Tennessee, an unincorporated community in McMinn County

== Other uses ==
Listed alphabetically by U.S. state

- Good Spring Baptist Church and Cemetery, in Kentucky
- Goodsprings Cemetery (Nevada)
- Goodsprings Schoolhouse, in Nevada
- Goodsprings Valley, in Nevada
- Goodsprings Waste Heat Recovery Station, in Nevada
- Good Spring Railroad, in Pennsylvania
