= Cedar Range =

Mountain range in Nevada, United States

- Location within Nevada

Highest point
- Elevation: 2,043 m (6,703 ft)

Geography
- Country: United States
- State: Nevada
- District: Lincoln County
- Range coordinates: 37°39′2.876″N 114°17′24.944″W
- Topo map: USGS Mosey Mountain

The Cedar Range is a mountain range in Lincoln County, Nevada.

The Cedar Range is the adjacent range north of the Clover Mountains, anchoring the south on the east perimeter of the Meadow Valley Wash watershed.

| Preceded by –NORTH– White; Rock; Mountains | Cedar; Range _____; Great; Basin; Divide | Succeeded by –SOUTH– Clover; Mountains |

== See also ==
- List of Great Basin Divide border landforms of Nevada
