= Tule (disambiguation) =

Tule is a plant (Schoenoplectus acutus) of the sedge family.

== Geography ==
Tule may also refer to the following places in the United States:

Arizona:

- Tule Desert or Tule Basin, in Coconino County
- Tule Mountains, in Yuma County

California:

- Los Tules, a populated place in San Diego County
- Tule Creek, California, a stream that roughly parallels the first few miles of California State Route 371
  - Tule Valley, California, in Riverside County (originally Round Valley)
- Tule Lake Basin, in Modoc County, near the 42nd parallel north
  - Tule Lake National Wildlife Refuge, an open water/croplands preserve of the United States Fish and Wildlife Service
  - Tule Lake War Relocation Center, a Japanese American internment camp of World War II
  - Tulelake, California, a city in Siskiyou County and namesake of the Tulelake Basin Joint Unified School District & Tulelake Municipal Airport
- Tule River, in Tulare County whose name derives from the tule plant.
  - Tule River Indian Tribe of the Tule River Reservation

Colorado:

- Tule Lakes, twin reservoirs separated by the Upper Tule Lake Dam in Arapahoe County

Montana:

- Tule Valley (Montana), the course of Tule Creek in Roosevelt County

Nevada:

- Tule Desert (Nevada), in Lincoln County
- Tule Springs, a series of lakes in the Mojave Desert
  - Tule Springs Archaeological Site, a National Register of Historic Places listing in Clark County, Nevada
  - Tule Springs Ice Age Park, fossil beds which the Protectors of Tule Springs Wash lobby to be a national monument
  - Tule Springs Ranch, a National Register of Historic Places listings in Nevada partly in the archaeological site
- Tule Springs Hills, a mountain range in Lincoln County
- Tule Valley (Nevada), on Pine Creek, Elko County

New Mexico:

- Little Tule Lake, in Curry County

Oregon:

- Tule Lake Valley, in Klamath County

Texas:

- Tule Canyon, a scenic area near Texas State Highway 207.
  - Tule Formation, the paleontological location of an extinct horse species (Equus francisci)
- Tule Creek, a river with the Mckenzie Dam/Reservoir, which is in Briscoe County
- Tule Lake Turning Basin, in Nueces County
- Tule Pens, a road intersection in Briscoe County

Utah:

- Tule Valley, Utah, an area of several valleys in the Great Salt Lake subregion
- Tule Valley (basin), in Millard County and the area of a desiccated paleolake

Washington:

- Tule Lake (Washington), in Whitman County (46.88243°N 122.433357°W)

== People ==
- Tu Le, an Australian lawyer

== Other uses ==
- Tule fog, a weather phenomenon of California's Central Valley
- Guna people, an indigenous people of Panama and Colombia, sometimes formerly called "Tule Indians"
