= Tule Desert (Nevada) =

Desert in Lincoln County, Nevada

Coordinates: 37°8′13″N 114°17′49″W

The Tule Desert is located in southeastern Nevada in Lincoln County, near the Utah state line. The desert lies northeast of the Mormon Mountains, south of the Clover Mountains and west of the Tule Springs Hills.

The desert descends from an elevation of around 4,300 feet (1,300 m) on the foothills of the Clover Mountains west of Lime Mountain to around 3,000 feet (910 m) about 17 miles (27 km) to the south-southeast at the narrow Toquop Gap between the East Mormon Mountains and the Tule Springs Hills.

A number of washes drain the desert in a generally north–south direction. The Tule Desert Well lies west of Jumbled Mountain at the south end of the Tule Springs Hills.

Access is via a county road east from Lyman Crossing along the Union Pacific railroad line between Carp and Elgin in Meadow Valley Wash. The road continues on to the south between the Mormon and East Mormon mountains to connect with Interstate 15 in Nevada at exit 100 west of Mesquite in Clark County.
