= Tule Springs Hills =

Mountain range in Lincoln County, Nevada, US

- Location within Nevada

Dimensions
- Length: 16 mi (26 km) NNW

Geography
- Country: United States
- State: Nevada
- District: Lincoln County
- Range coordinates: 37°4′50″N 114°10′44″W
- Topo map: USGS Tule Spring

The Tule Springs Hills are a mountain range in eastern Lincoln County, Nevada. The Tule Desert lies to the west. The Mormon Mountains and East Mormon Mountains are to the southwest, the Clover Mountains to the north and the Beaver Dam Mountains of Utah are to the east.

On the southwest the hills are separated from the East Mormon Mountains by the narrow Toquop Gap through which the Toquop Wash drains the south end of the Tule Desert. The range of hills extends from Lime Mountain (5,482 feet (1,671 m)) on the southern margin of the Clover Mountains for approximately 16 miles (26 km) south-southeast to the peak above Toquop Gap at 3,145 feet (959 m).
