= Flying coffin =

Flying coffin is a pejorative term for an aircraft perceived by crews or the public to have a poor safety record or low combat effectiveness.

== Commercial aircraft ==
- McDonnell Douglas DC-10, an American trijet wide-body aircraft
- Boeing 737 MAX, an American narrow-body airliner

== Military aircraft ==
=== First World War and earlier ===
- Airco DH.4, a British two-seat biplane day bomber also called a "flaming coffin" with original fuel tank configuration
- Airco DH.6, a British military trainer biplane used by the Royal Flying Corps
- Georges Levy G.L.40, a three-seated French, amphibious biplane
- Hansa-Brandenburg D.I, also known as the KD (Kampf Doppeldecker) was a German fighter aircraft
- Royal Aircraft Factory B.E.2, a British single-engine tractor two-seat biplane also called "Fokker fodder"
- Fokker D.VII, a dutch single-engine 180hp monoPlane, ("dutch built German used 'Flying Coffin'")

=== Interwar period ===
- Brewster F2A Buffalo, an American fighter aircraft which saw service early in World War II
- Potez 540, a French multi-role aircraft which saw service in the Spanish Civil War

=== Second World War ===
- Consolidated B-24 Liberator, an American long-range heavy bomber
- Curtiss C-46 Commando, a twin-engine pressurized high-altitude transport aircraft
- Heinkel He 177 Greif, a long-range heavy bomber flown by the Luftwaffe also called a "flaming coffin"
- Lavochkin-Gorbunov-Gudkov LaGG-3, a Soviet fighter aircraft built extensively with wood
- Martin B-26 Marauder, an American twin-engined medium bomber

=== 1945–present ===
- Lockheed F-104 Starfighter, an American Cold War-era single-engine, supersonic interceptor aircraft also used by the German Air Force
- Mikoyan-Gurevich MiG-21, a Soviet supersonic jet fighter and interceptor aircraft

== See also ==
- Coffin corner (disambiguation)
- Widow maker (disambiguation)
