= Delamar Mountains =

Mountain range in Nevada, United States

- Location within Nevada

Highest point
- Peak: Chokecherry Mountain
- Elevation: 2,449 m (8,035 ft)
- Coordinates: 37°32′04″N 114°44′03″W

Dimensions
- Length: 50 mi (80 km) NNE
- Width: 11 mi (18 km)

Geography
- Country: United States
- State: Nevada
- District: Lincoln County
- Range coordinates: 37°17′53″N 114°45′58″W
- Topo map: USGS Gregerson Basin

The Delamar Mountains are a mountain range in Lincoln County, Nevada, named after Captain Joseph Raphael De Lamar. The range extends for approximately 50 miles (80 km) in a NNE–SSW orientation with a width of about 11 miles (18 km). Surrounding ranges include the Burnt Springs Range and the Chief Range to the north, the Clover Mountains and Meadow Valley Mountains to the east and the Sheep Range and South Pahroc Range on the west. The Delamar Valley lies to the west, the Kane Springs Valley to the east and the Coyote Springs Valley lies to the south of the range.

U.S. Route 93 traverses the north end of the range between Crystal Springs and Caliente. The elevation of the route reaches 6243 feet at Oak Springs Summit pass. Nevada State Route 317 follows Rainbow Canyon south along the northeast margin of the range between Caliente and Elgin.

The range's crest forms part of the Great Basin Divide between the Meadow Watershed and the Dry Lake Watershed, which includes Delamar Dry Lake and the old mining townsite of Delamar.

== Wilderness ==
The Delamar Mountains Wilderness covers 111,066 acres in the southern portion of the range and was established in 2004. The wilderness contains a multitude of peaks and hills connected by a network of washes, draws, and canyons. Elevations range from 2,600 feet (792 m) to 6,200 feet (1889 m). Wildlife include the desert bighorn sheep as well as desert tortoises in the lower elevation bajada sections.

== Geology ==
The range contains Paleozoic sedimentary rocks which were faulted and deformed during the Sevier orogeny. Two periods of silicic volcanism occurred during the Cenozoic producing multiple layers of ash flow tuff. The first occurred during the Oligocene to early Miocene (27 to 18.6 Ma) with sources from the Central Nevada Caldera Complex and Caliente Caldera events. The Kane Springs Wash Caldera in the central part of the Delamar range and extending into the adjacent Meadow Valley Mountains erupted at 14.5 Ma producing the Kane Wash Tuff.
