= Snake Mountain =

Snake Mountain may refer to:

== Places ==
- Snake Mountain (North Carolina - Tennessee), USA
- Snake Mountain (Vermont), USA
- Snake Mountains of Nevada, USA

== Other uses ==
- The fictional headquarters of Skeletor in the Masters of the Universe cartoon series
