= Jean Lake =

- Jean Dry Lake
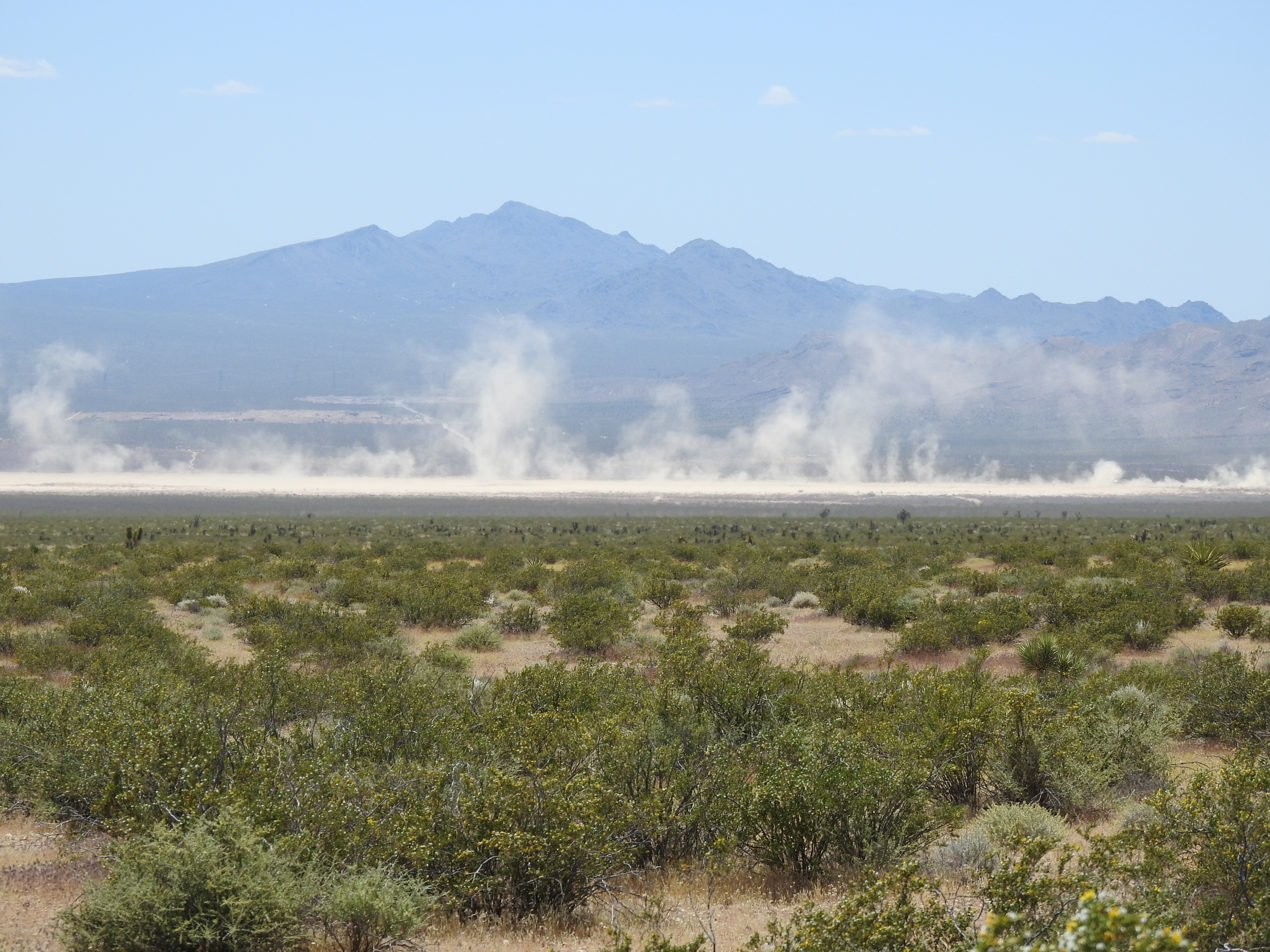
- Dust from ATVs on Jean Dry Lake

- Location within Nevada
- Location: Clark County, Nevada
- Coordinates: 35°47′19″N 115°15′40″W
- Type: endorheic dry lake
- Basin countries: United States
- Surface elevation: 2,772 feet (845 m)

Jean Lake, (or Jean Dry Lake), is a small endorheic dry lake 3 miles (4.8 km) east of Jean, Nevada and Interstate 15. It lies at an elevation of 2,772 feet (845 m).

With the Bird Spring Range adjacent to the northwest, it is in the Las Vegas Wash Watershed. Roach Lake in the north Ivanpah Valley is nearby to the south southwest.

== In popular culture ==
The dry lake bed is a popular filming location for photo shoots, music videos, and films. Casino, Fear and Loathing in Las Vegas, and The Hangover contain scenes filmed at Jean Dry Lake. It is close to the site of the 2016-2018 land art installation Seven Magic Mountains.
