= Davidson Peak (Nevada) =

Mountain in Nevada, United States

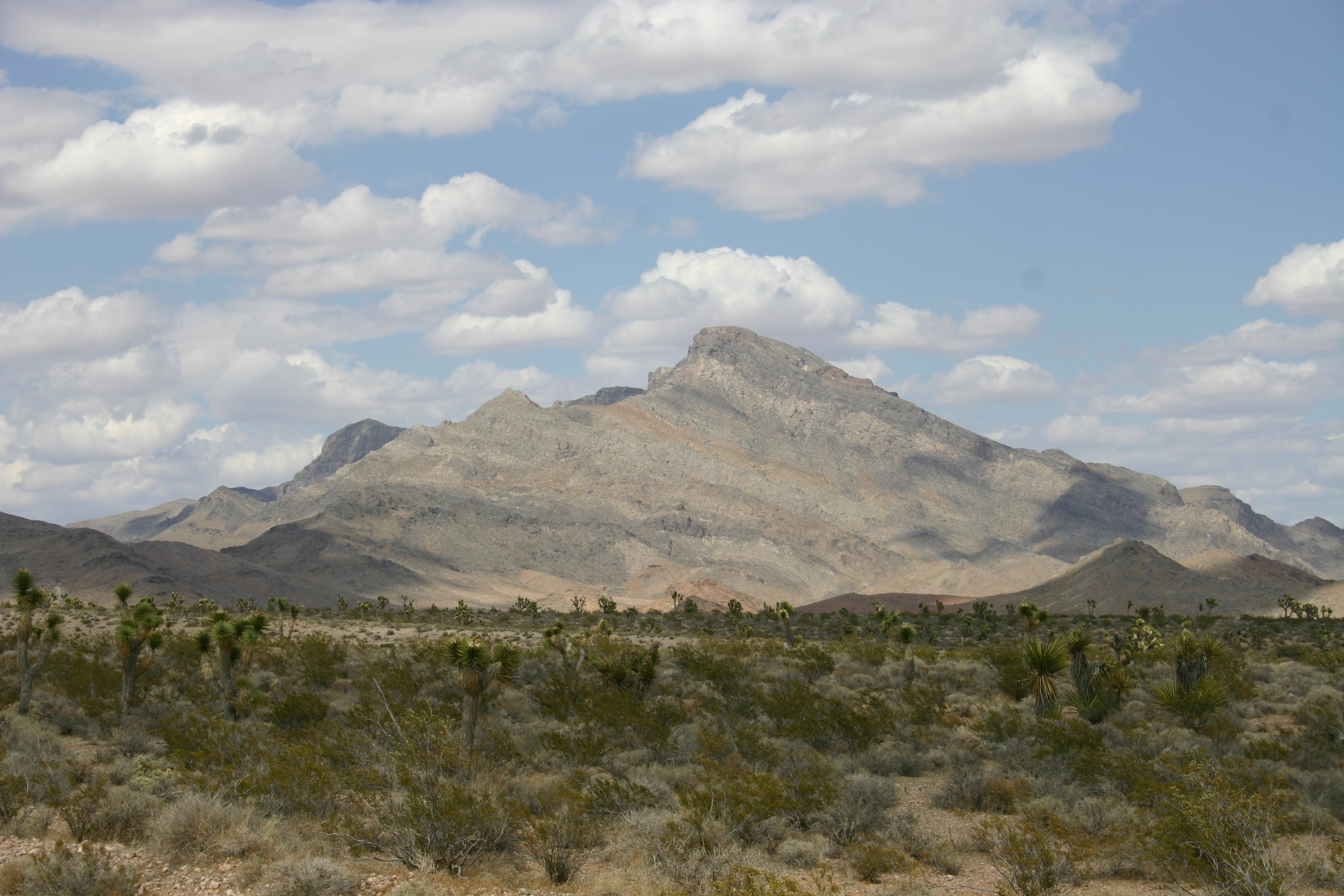
- South aspect

Highest point
- Elevation: 5,276 ft (1,608 m)
- Prominence: 1,680 ft (512 m)
- Parent peak: Peak 5439
- Isolation: 4.16 mi (6.69 km)
- Coordinates: 36°53′45″N 114°19′30″W

Geography
- Location within Nevada Location within the United States
- Country: United States of America
- State: Nevada
- County: Lincoln
- Parent range: East Mormon Mountains; Great Basin Ranges
- Topo map: USGS Worthington Peak

Climbing
- Easiest route: class 2 hiking

Davidson Peak is the tallest summit and the southernmost in the East Mormon Mountains, Nevada, United States. It rises to an elevation of 5,276 feet (1,608 meters).

== Climate ==
Davidson Peak is set in the Great Basin Desert which has hot summers and cold winters. The desert is an example of a cold desert climate as the desert's elevation makes temperatures cooler than lower elevation deserts. Due to the high elevation and aridity, temperatures drop sharply after sunset. Summer nights are comfortably cool. Winter highs are generally above freezing, and winter nights are bitterly cold, with temperatures often dropping well below freezing.

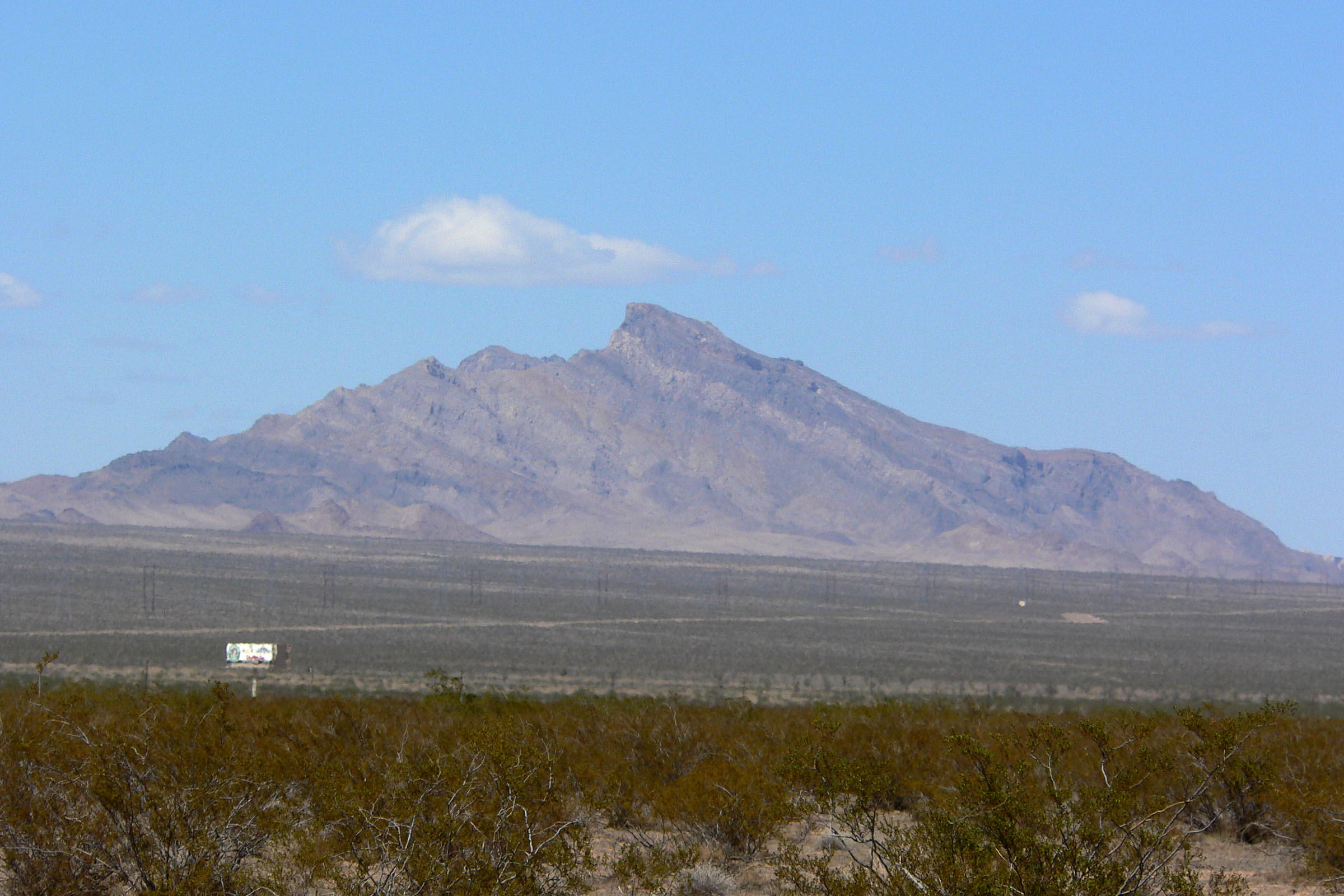
Davidson Peak

== See also ==
- Great Basin
