= Clover Mountains Wilderness =

Protected area in Nevada, United States

- IUCN category Ib (wilderness area)
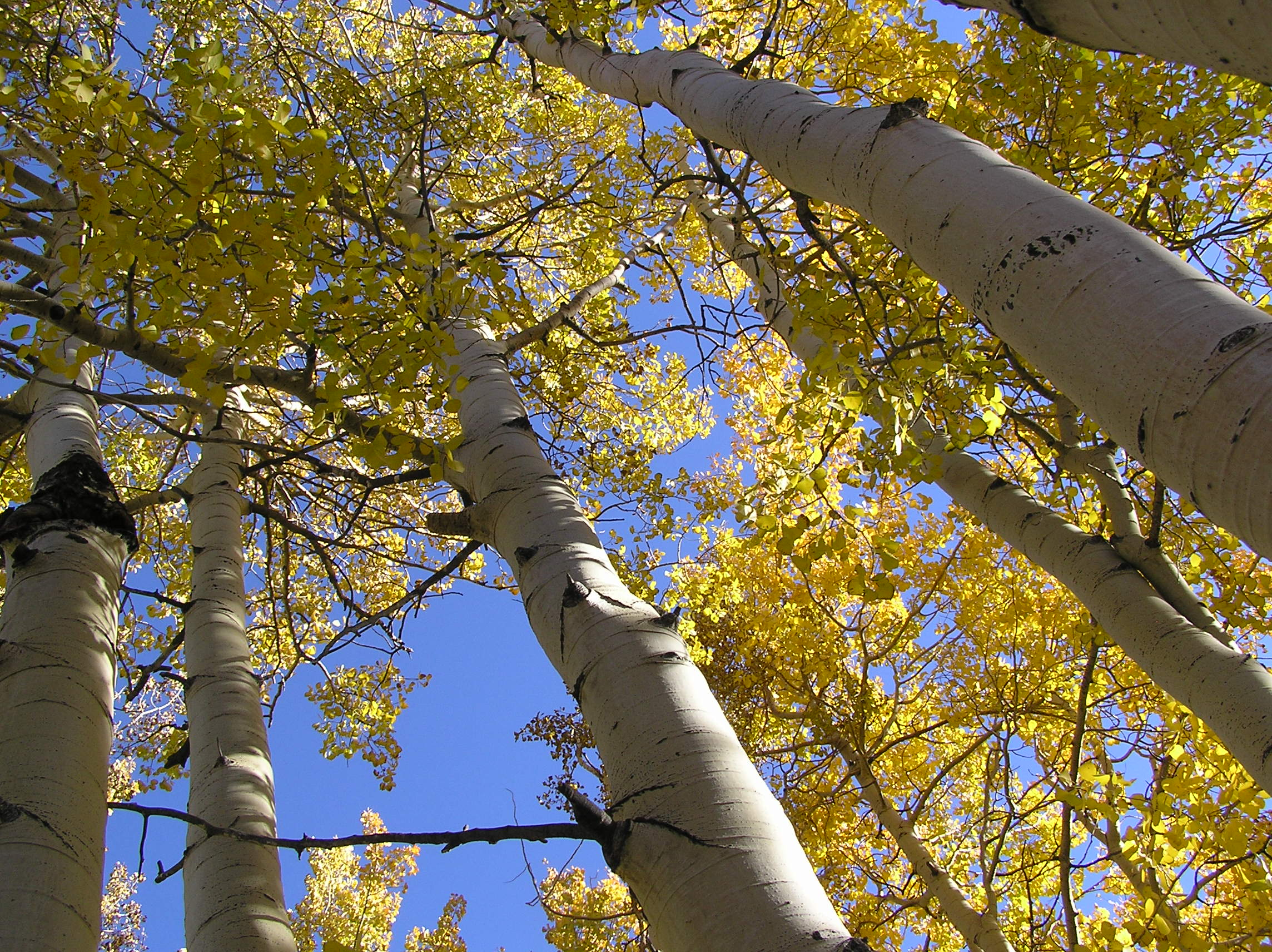
- Populus tremuloides

- Location within Nevada
- Location: Caliente, NV–Indian Cove, NV (Elgin, NV), Lincoln County, Nevada, United States
- Coordinates: 37.4047°N 114.3269°W
- Area: 347 km^{2} (134 sq mi)
- Established: 2004
- Governing body: BLM

Clover Mountains Wilderness is a 85,668-acre (34,669 ha) large wilderness area southeast of Caliente, Nevada in southeast Lincoln County's border region with southwest Utah.

The wilderness comprises much of the Clover Mountains and has biome influences from the Tule Desert adjacent to the southeast. It also lies in a border region on the Great Basin Divide, at the northeast of the Mojave Desert and the south-southeast of the Great Basin regions.

== Description ==
The large Clover Mountain region contains numerous spires, rock outcrops, meandering canyons, and perennial streams. The peaks in the mountains rise to more than 7,000 ft (2,134 m) with areas of old-growth forest; riparian streams also yield species of ash and cottonwood.

=== Geology ===
The Clover Mountains Wilderness is a former volcanic region. It contains rhyolite with various colors, pink, red, yellow, orange and browns. Numerous spires, rock outcrops, meandering canyons, and perennial streams occur in the region.

== Flora and fauna ==
The Clover Mountains Wilderness contains stands of Ponderosa Pine and Quaking Aspen. The southern portion of the wilderness contains species from the Tule Desert (Nevada), sagebrush and Joshua Trees.

Some fauna of the region include mountain lion, badger, bobcat, Desert Bighorn Sheep, prairie falcon, and golden eagles.

== See also ==
- List of U.S. Wilderness Areas
- List of wilderness areas in Nevada
