= Goodsprings Cemetery =

Goodsprings Cemetery may refer to:

- Goodsprings Cemetery (Alabama)
- Goodsprings Cemetery (Nevada)
- Goodsprings Cemetery (Tennessee)

== See also ==
- Good Spring Baptist Church and Cemetery, in Kentucky
