= Meadow Valley Mountains =

Mountain range in Nevada, United States

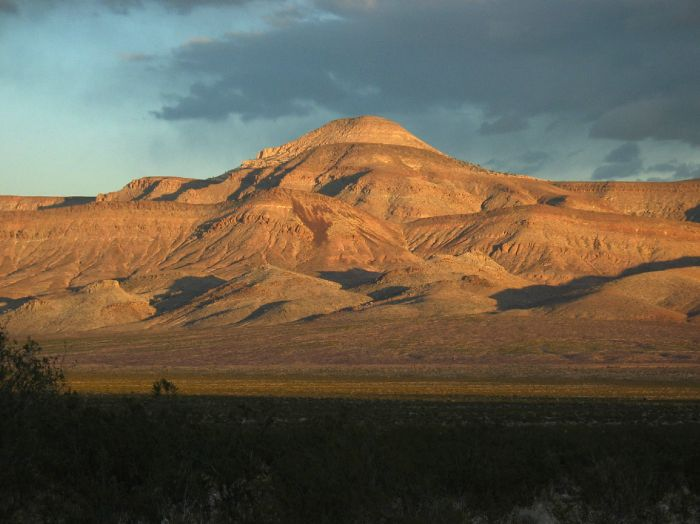
- Sunflower Mountain in the Meadow Valley Mountains

Highest point
- Peak: Unnamed peak
- Elevation: 1,759 m (5,771 ft)
- Coordinates: 37°01′53″N 114°47′35″W

Geography
- Location within Nevada
- Country: United States
- State: Nevada
- District: Lincoln County
- Range coordinates: 37°4′36.883″N 114°43′23.990″W
- Topo map: USGS Sunflower Mountain

The Meadow Valley Mountains is a mountain range in Lincoln and Clark counties in southern Nevada. The range is a narrow north to northeast trending ridgeline with a length of about 40 miles (64 km). The Clover Mountains lie to the north, Meadow Valley Wash and the Mormon Mountains to the east, the Moapa Valley to the southeast, Arrow Canyon Range to the south, Coyote Springs Valley to the southwest and the Kane Springs Valley and Delamar Mountains to the west and northwest.

Established in 2004 by the U.S. Congress and managed by the U.S. Bureau of Land Management, the bulk of the range lies within the Meadow Valley Range Wilderness. The wilderness area consists of three major landforms: the long ridgeline of the Meadow Valley Mountains, a large bajada beginning high on the main ridge sloping easterly towards Meadow Valley Wash, and finally the Bunker Hills five miles from the southern section of the central bajada. Conical Sunflower Mountain (elevation 5,022 feet (1,531 m)) sits astride the main ridgeline.
