= Delamar, Nevada =

- Ghost town
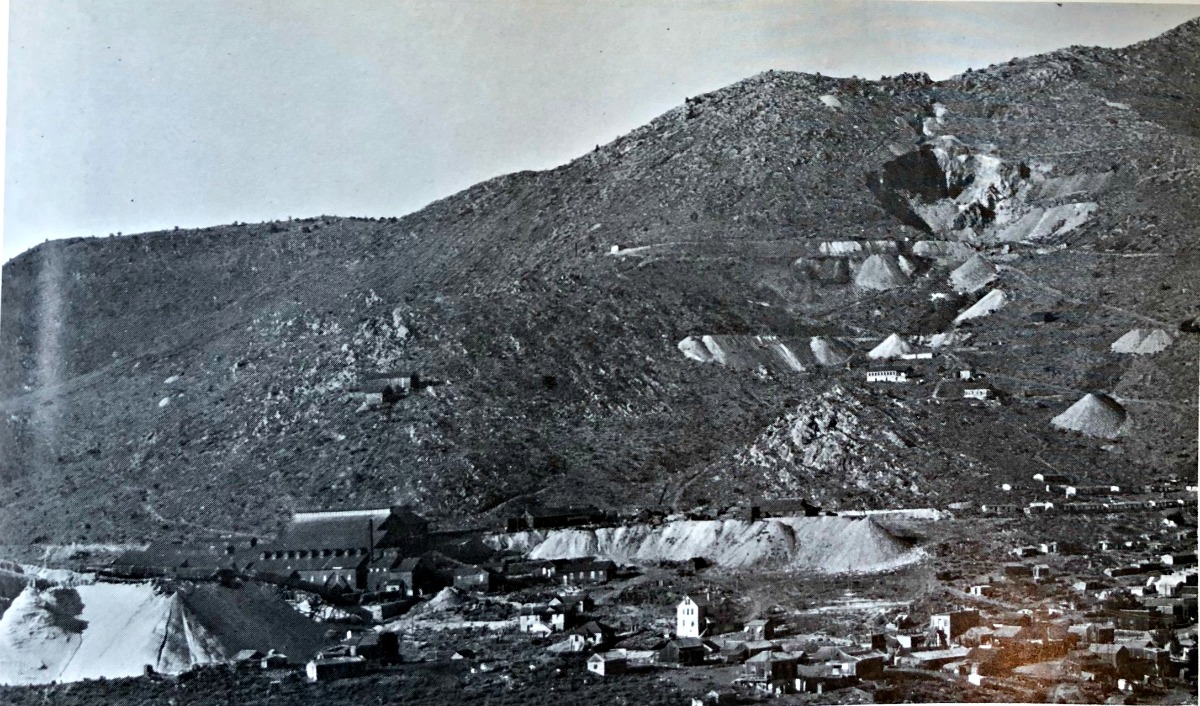

- Location within Nevada Location within the United States
- Coordinates: 37°27′29″N 114°46′12″W
- Country: United States
- State: Nevada
- County: Lincoln
- Time zone: UTC-8 (Pacific (PST))
  - Summer (DST): UTC-7 (PDT)

Nevada Historical Marker
- Official name: Delamar "The Widow Maker" (1893-1909)
- Reference no.: 90

Delamar, nicknamed The Widowmaker, is a ghost town in central eastern Nevada, United States along the east side of the Delamar Valley. During its heyday, primarily between 1895 and 1900, it produced $13.5 million in gold.

== History ==
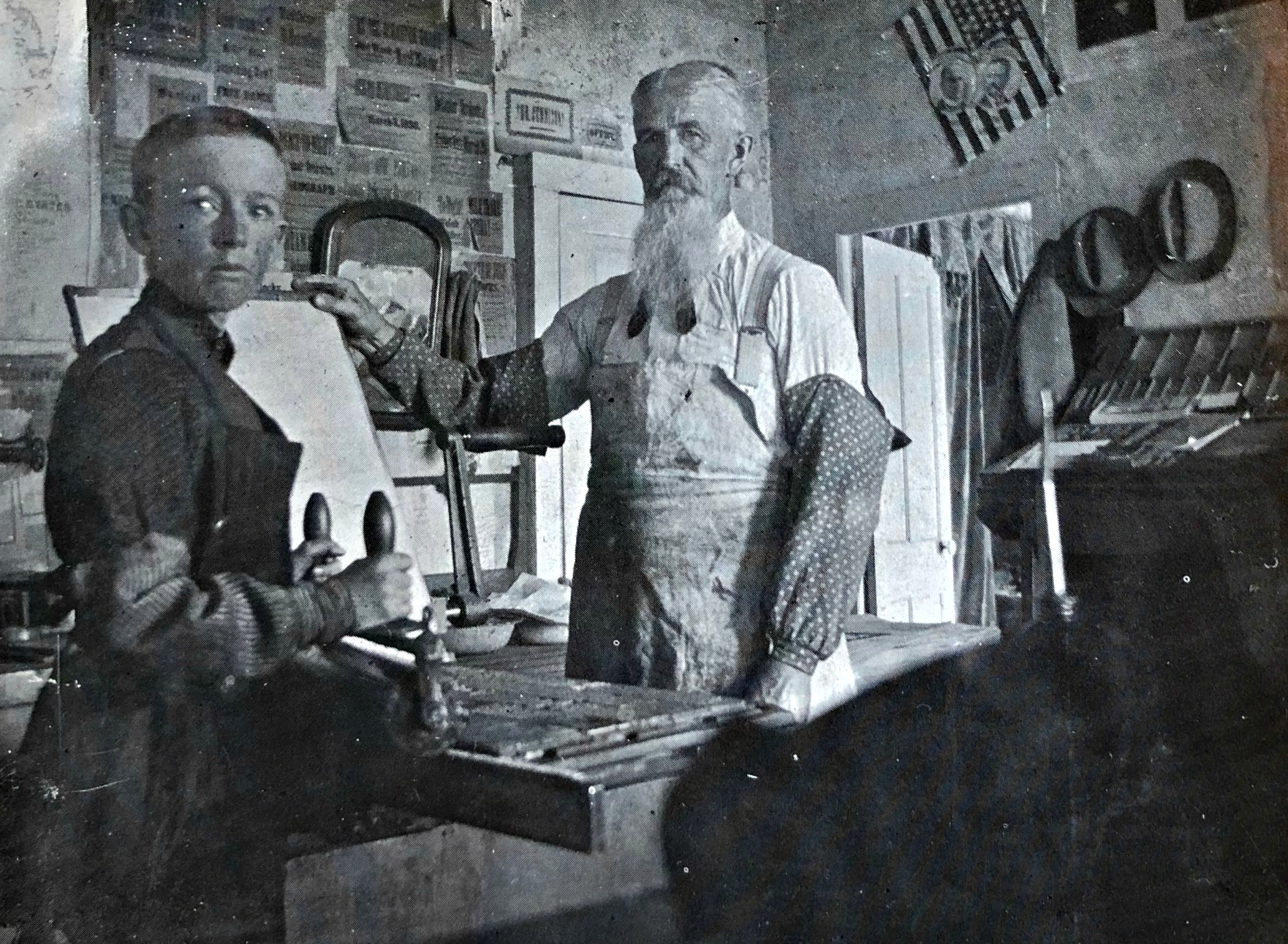
The Delamar Lode newspaper office, 1890s

In 1889, prospectors John Ferguson and Joseph Sharp discovered gold around Monkeywrench Wash. A mining camp was established west of the Monkeywrench Mine. It was called Ferguson. In April 1894, Captain Joseph Raphael De Lamar bought most of the important mines in the area and renamed the Ferguson camp as Delamar. In the same year, a newspaper called the Delamar Lode began publication and a post office was opened.

From 1895 to 1900, Delamar was the primary ore producer in Nevada. The new settlement had more than 3000 residents by 1897. The town provided a hospital, an opera house, churches, a school, several businesses and saloons. Most buildings were made of native rock. By 1896, the Delamar mill was handling up to 260 tons of ore daily. Water for the camp was pumped from a well in Meadow Valley Wash, some twelve miles away. Supplies and materials traveled even further, by mule team over mountainous terrain from the railroad head at Milford, Utah, which was 150 miles from Delamar.

The town was almost entirely destroyed by fire in the spring of 1900. In 1902, Captain De Lamar sold his mines which had produced $8.5 million in gold. The new owners installed a new 400-ton mill in 1903. The mine eventually discontinued operations in 1909. A town revival from 1929 to 1934 included the reopening of the post office (March 1933) and school. The post office closed in February 1941.

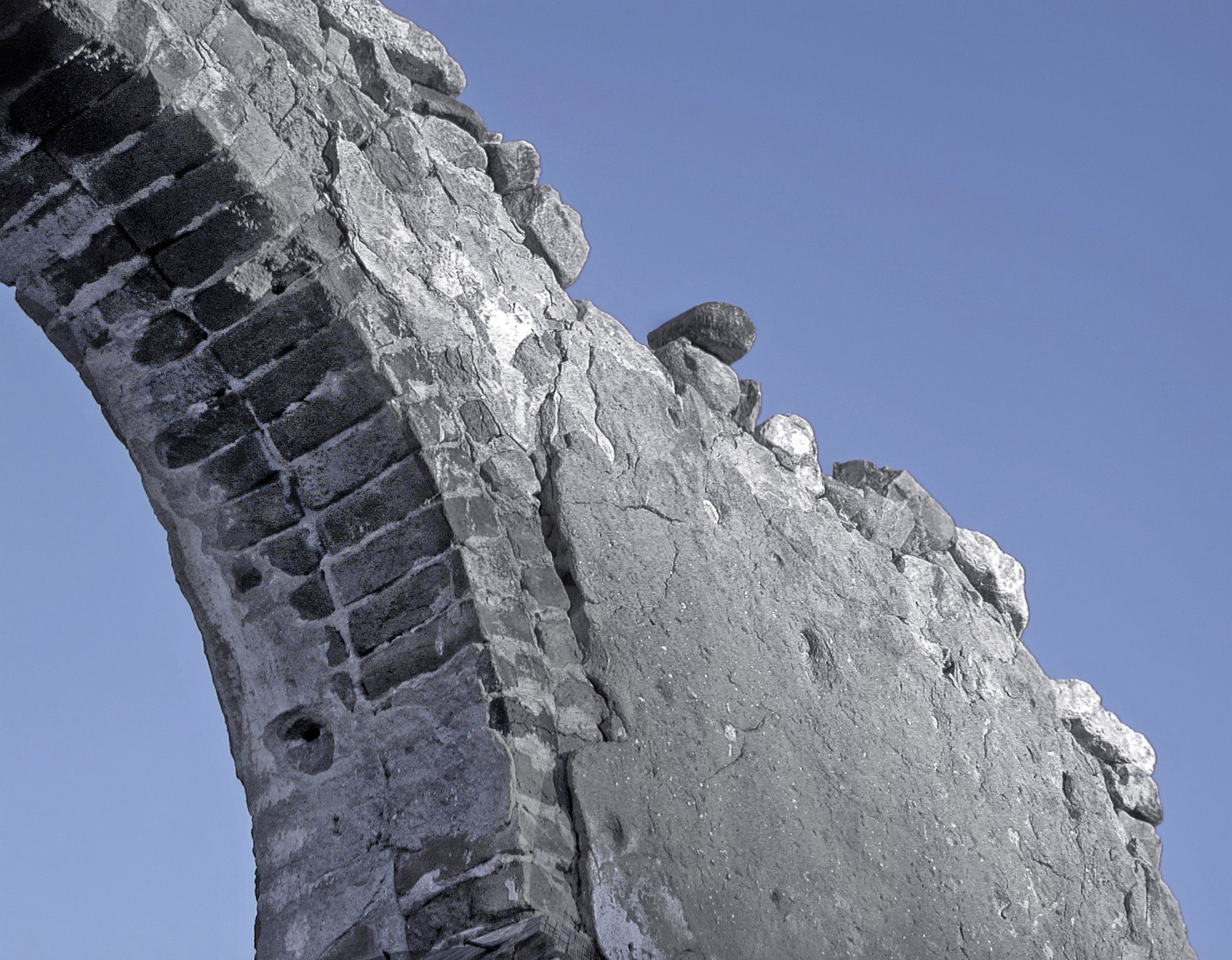
Delamar Stone Arch Remains

The population was 25 in 1940.

There are few reminders of the town. Many stone ruins stand semi-intact in the area. Mining foundations can easily be seen from adjacent hills. There are two graveyards, which have been vandalized. The area is honeycombed with mines and mine shafts, but in recent years the main shaft has been blasted closed.

=== Silicosis ===
The gold in the Delamar mines was embedded in quartzite, which created a fine dust when crushed. Miners breathing the dust often developed silicosis and the town became known as a "widow-maker."

== See also ==
- Delamar Dry Lake
- Delamar Mountains
