= Widowmaker (comics) =

Widowmaker, in comics, may refer to:

- Widowmaker (Marvel Comics), a four issue comic book limited series published by Marvel Comics starring superheroes Black Widow, Hawkeye and Mockingbird
- Widowmaker (Image Comics), an assassin from the Image Comics series Noble Causes
- "Widowmaker", a Marvel Comics storyline written by Andy Diggle appearing in Thunderbolts
- "Widowmaker", a Marvel Comics storyline written by Garth Ennis appearing in Punisher MAX
- Widow Maker, a character from Jonah Hex

== See also ==
- Widowmaker (disambiguation)
