= Antelope Peak (Snake Mountains) =

Summit in ELko County, Nevada, United States

- Location within Nevada

Highest point
- Elevation: 10,246 ft (3,123 m) NAVD 88
- Prominence: 921 ft (281 m)
- Listing: Great Basin Peaks List; Western States Climbers Emblem Peaks
- Coordinates: 41°19′23″N 114°58′41″W

Geography
- Location: Eureka County, Nevada, U.S.
- Parent range: Monitor Range
- Topo map: USGS Antelope Peak

Antelope Peak is a summit in the Snake Mountains in Elko County, Nevada, United States. The elevation is 10,246 feet (3,123 m).

Antelope Peak was so named on account of antelope (Pronghorn) which roamed the area.

== See also ==
- List of mountains of Nevada
