= Delamar Dry Lake =

Airport in Nevada, United States

Delamar Lake Landing Strip
- IATA: none; ICAO: none

Summary
- Coordinates: 37°19′13.87″N 114°56′55.03″W

Map
- Location within Nevada

Runways
Direction	Length		Surface
Direction	ft	m	Surface
	15,000	4,572	unpaved dry lake bed

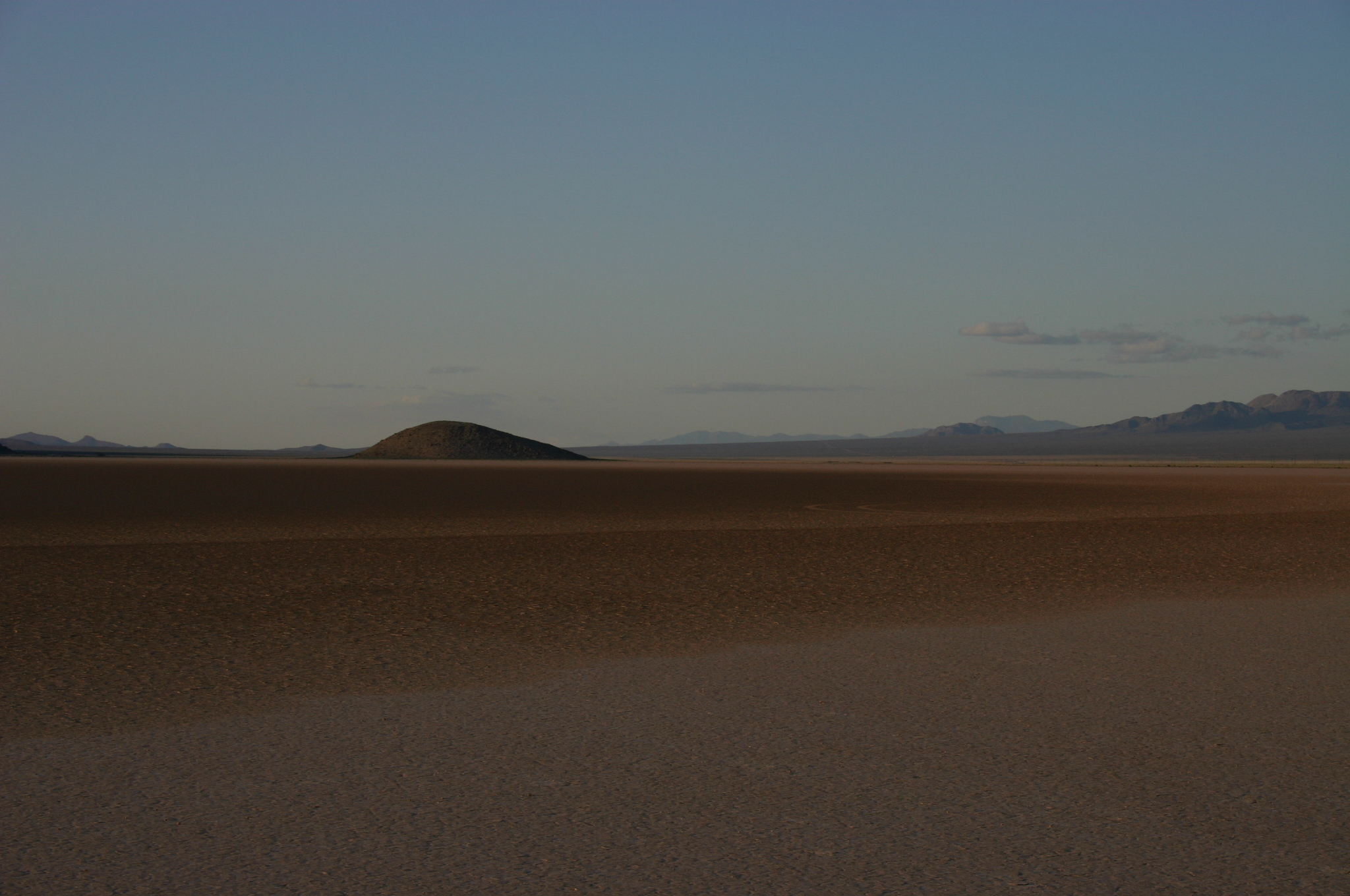
Delamar Dry Lake

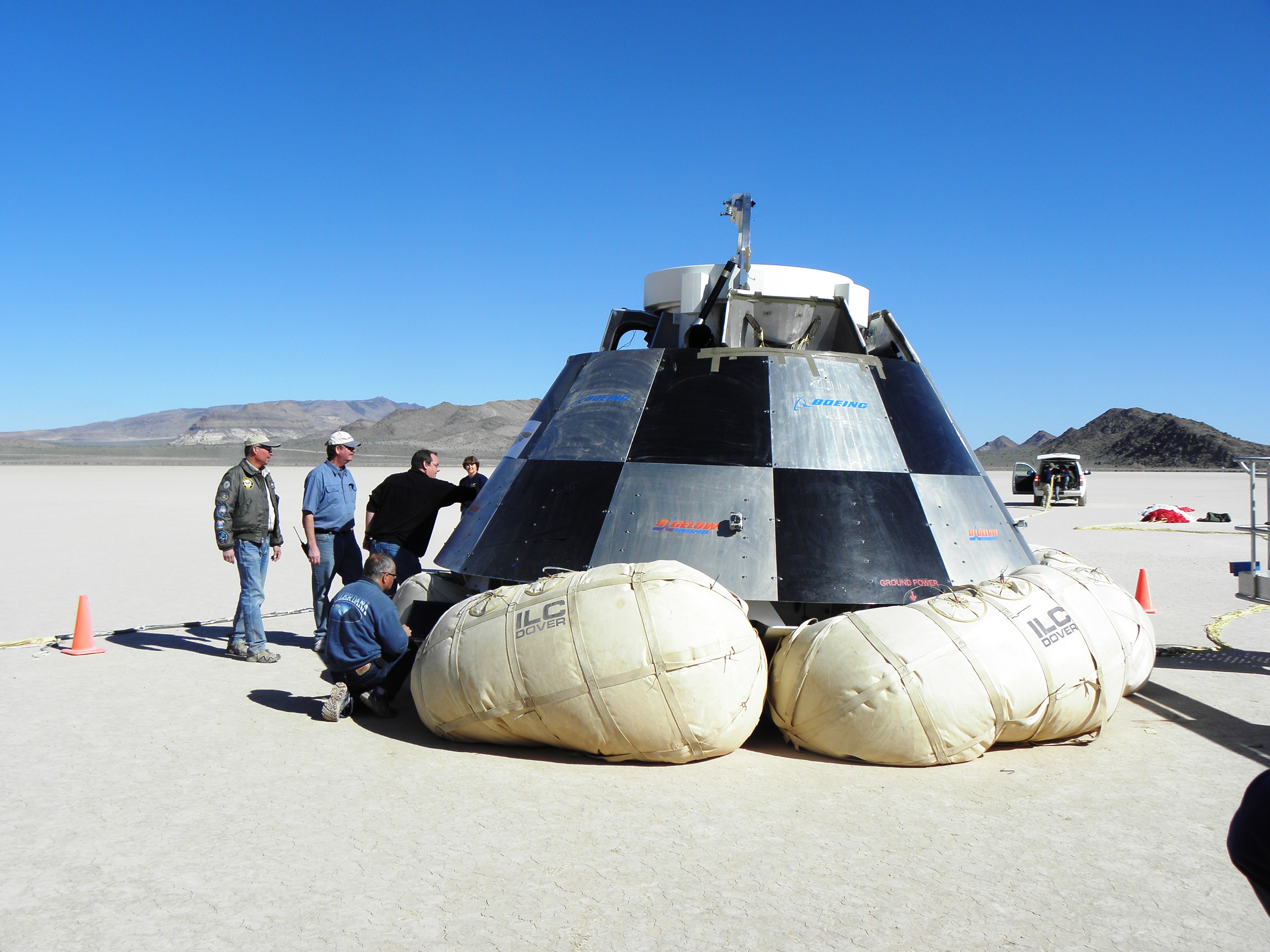
Test of the Crew Space Transportation capsule (CST-100 Starliner) at Delamar, 2012

Delamar Dry Lake is a dry lake bed located in the Dry Lake Watershed near Alamo in Lincoln County, Nevada. It is located on federal land administered by the Bureau of Land Management.

== Delamar Dry Lake Landing Strip ==
Delamar Lake Landing Strip, established in 1943, was designated as an emergency landing site for the X-15. No structures were built there. The lake bed remains, but it is no longer maintained as an airport.

Delamar was listed as having one runway:

- Runway 15,000 feet, Surface: unpaved dry lake bed

However, on a dry lake bed an aircraft may land in any direction.

== History ==
Delamar Lake Landing Strip was one of the designated emergency landing sites for the X-15 because it was underneath the Delamar Dry Lake Drop Zone where the X-15s were drop-launched from the B-52 for high altitude and space flights.

On May 21, 1962, X-15 pilot Neil Armstrong, who later became a Gemini and Apollo astronaut, flew a Lockheed F-104 Starfighter to Delamar Dry Lake in case it would be needed for an upcoming X-15 flight. The F-104 was damaged in the landing attempt at Delamar when the landing gear began to retract. Armstrong got the plane back in the air and diverted to Nellis Air Force Base near Las Vegas.

During Flight 1-63-104 on May 6, 1966, an X-15 experienced an engine failure and landed at Delamar Dry Lake.

The U.S. Air Force now refers to Delamar Dry Lake Bed as "Texas Lake" because of its resemblance to the state of Texas from the air.

An eyewitness report regarding the Space Shuttle Columbia disaster came from a camper who was at Delamar Dry Lake on the morning of February 1, 2003. The eyewitness saw the space shuttle cross the pre-dawn sky, as well as a bright flash in the contrail. Minutes later, the camper saw two "twinkles" descend into mountains perceived to be nearby. NASA considered this report credible enough to analyze radar data and send a ground search crew to the area to look for debris. None were found.

=== Message to space ===
In January, 2015, a large team from Hyundai Motor Company, driving several of the company's sedans equipped with spike-studded tires, created a "message to space" on the Delamar Dry Lake. This message, which was visible and photographed from the International Space Station, stated "Steph ♥s you!" — sent to an ISS astronaut by his 13-year-old daughter. This work was done to promote the release of the second generation of Genesis car model of the Hyundai Motor Company. This feat was awarded the Guinness World Record for "Largest Tire Track."

== Caliente Flight Strip ==
Caliente Flight Strip, also known as the Delamar Landing Field, was also located on the dry lake bed before it closed in the 1990s.

== See also ==
- Delamar, Nevada – nearby ghost town
- Delamar Mountains
