= Kern River Pipeline =

Gas pipeline

Kern River Pipeline is a 1,679-mile (2,702 km) long natural gas pipeline line extending from southwestern Wyoming to its terminus near Bakersfield, California. The pipeline supplies local gas distribution companies, power plants, and heavy industry in Utah, Nevada, and California. It is owned and operated by the Kern River Gas Transmission Company, a subsidiary of Berkshire Hathaway Energy. Its FERC code is 99.

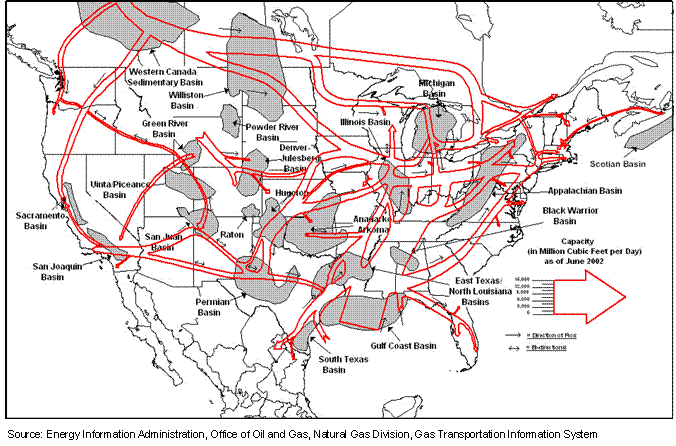
Map US Natural Gas basin and pipelines, Kern River Pipeline runs from Green River basin to San Joaquin basin

The line provides 80% of the natural gas used in the Las Vegas Valley. The Goodsprings Waste Heat Recovery Station recovers up to 7.5MW of energy from a compressor station.

The gas line is made of 36-inch (910 mm) diameter pipe, and can deliver up to 1.76 billion cubic feet (50 million cubic metres) per day. There are 11 compressor stations on the line. The gas line delivers gas to Utah, Nevada, California and Arizona. Most of the gas is from the Pinedale Anticline gas field, near Pinedale, Wyoming in the Green River basin.
