= Carp, Nevada =

- Ghost town
- Location within Nevada Location within the United States
- Coordinates: 37°06′43″N 114°29′34″W
- Country: United States
- State: Nevada
- County: Lincoln
- Elevation: 2,579 ft (786 m)
- Time zone: UTC-8 (Pacific (PST))
  - Summer (DST): UTC-7 (PDT)
- GNIS feature ID: 845397

Carp, Nevada is an extinct town in Lincoln County, Nevada, United States located 35 miles (56 km) south of Caliente. It sits on the Meadow Valley Wash, which empties into Lake Mead.

Carp was originally a small railroad station for the Union Pacific Railroad. The post office started under the name of "Cliffdale" on June 29, 1918, but was rescinded. It then officially opened under the name of "Cliffdale" June 7, 1921 and changed yet again to "Carp" December 1, 1925. The present name "Carp" is after a railroad agent. In 1941 the population was 66. The Carp post office remained open to serve rural ranches until July 1, 1974, when it closed permanently. Little remains of Carp today except a railroad siding usually occupied by idling trains, and the remains of the watering reservoir.
