= Mormon Peak (Nevada) =

Mountain in the state of Nevada

- Location within Nevada

Highest point
- Elevation: 7,414 ft (2,260 m) NAVD 88
- Prominence: 4,014 ft (1,223 m)
- Coordinates: 36°58′27″N 114°30′02″W

Geography
- Location: Lincoln County, Nevada, U.S.
- Parent range: Mormon Mountains
- Topo map: USGS Moapa Peak NW

Mormon Peak is the highest mountain in the Mormon Mountains of Lincoln County in Nevada, United States. It is the most topographically prominent peak in Lincoln County and ranks twenty-fourth among the most topographically prominent peaks in Nevada. The peak is on public land administered by the Bureau of Land Management and thus has no access restrictions.

== See also ==
- Mormon Mountains
