= Goodsprings Valley =

Geologic basin in southern Nevada, United States of America

Coordinates: 35°49′35″N 115°25′05″W

Goodsprings Valley is a basin in Clark County of southern Nevada. It lies at an elevation of 3,566 ft (1,087 m) between the Spring Mountains to the northwest and southwest and the Bird Spring Range to the northeast. Goodsprings Valley drains southeast into the Ivanpah Valley. The valley is the location of the town of Goodsprings, Nevada in the midst of the basin.
