= Mormon Mountains =

American mountain range in Nevada

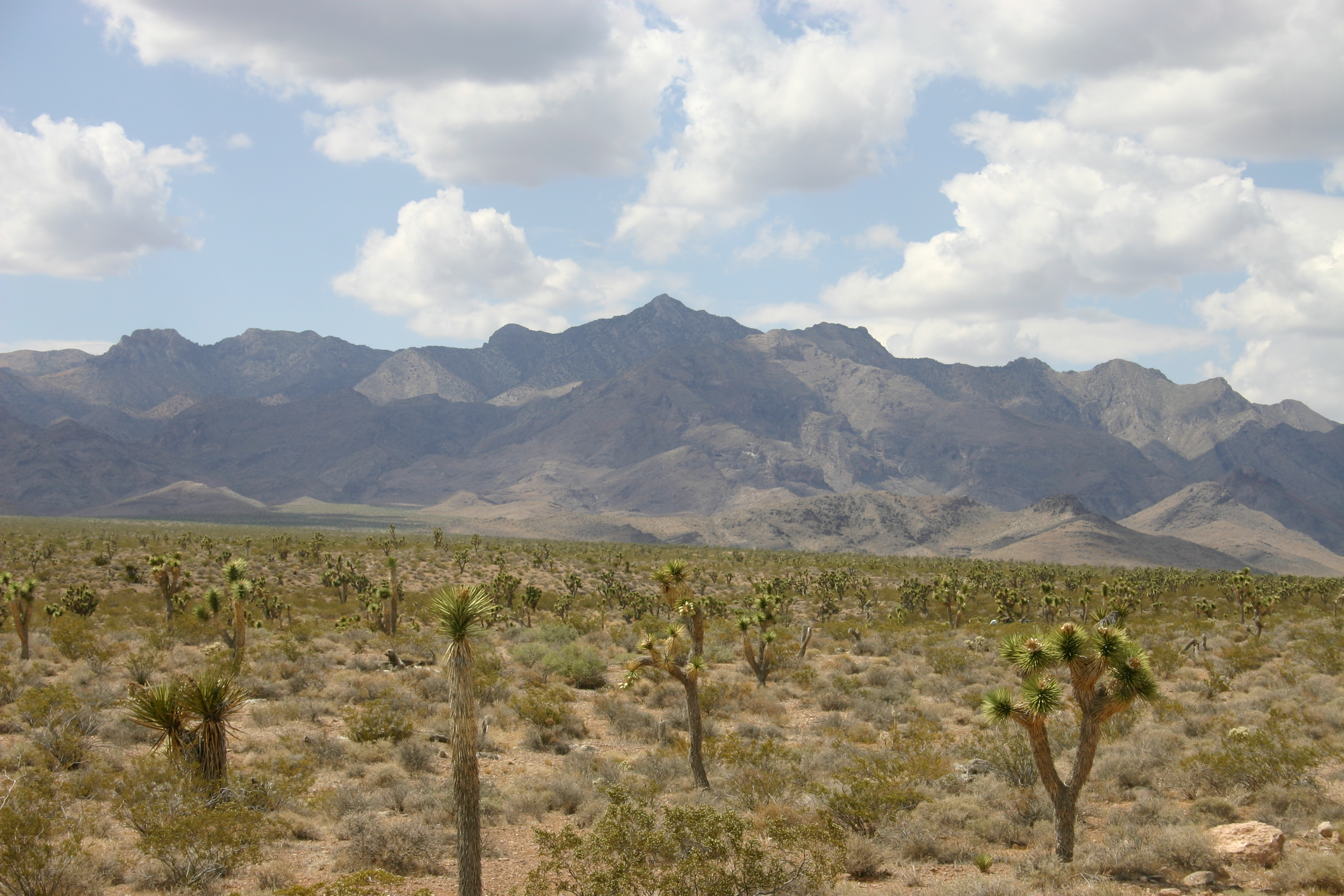
- Mormon Mountains

Highest point
- Peak: Mormon Peak
- Elevation: 2,260 m (7,410 ft)
- Coordinates: 36°58′27″N 114°30′02″W

Geography
- Location within Nevada
- Country: United States
- State: Nevada
- Region: Great Basin section
- District(s): Lincoln County and Clark County
- Range coordinates: 36°56′53″N 114°27′37″W
- Topo map: USGS Moapa Peak NW

The Mormon Mountains are located in Lincoln and Clark counties in Nevada, between 16 and 28 miles (45 km) northwest of Mesquite on I–15 in the Virgin Valley, east of the Meadow Valley Mountains and Meadow Valley and northeast of Moapa Valley. The highest point in the range is Mormon Peak, at 7,414 feet (2,260 m) above sea level. Another smaller mountain range lies to the east, called the East Mormon Mountains. The south fork of the Toquop Wash drains the east side of the range and continues on through the N–S linear ridge of the East Mormon Mountains.

The mountains fall under the jurisdiction of the Bureau of Land Management (BLM) and cover approximately 175 square miles (450 km^{2}). The Mormon Mountains are home to several different species of lizards, and ground snakes, toads and bullfrogs can be found in the region. The lower elevations of the range are mostly shrublands, but at higher elevations one can find "pygmy conifers" and single-leaf pinyon pines, in the Pinyon-juniper woodland plant community.

The area is characterized by very low rainfall, receiving less than 15 inches (380 mm) per year, on average.

The range was named for the fact a share of the first settlers were Mormons. A variant name is "Mormon Range".

== Mormon Mountains Wilderness ==
As part of the Lincoln County Conservation, Recreation, and Development Act signed into law on 30 November 2004, 157,716 acres (63,825 ha) in the area were designated as wilderness. The wilderness is managed by the BLM through their Ely District office.
