= Specter Range =

Mountain range in Nevada, United States

- Location within Nevada

Highest point
- Peak: Eagle Peak
- Elevation: 1,485 m (4,872 ft)
- Coordinates: 36°38.25′N 116°09.39′W

Dimensions
- Length: 13 mi (21 km) NNW–SSE
- Width: 5 mi (8.0 km)

Geography
- Country: United States
- State: Nevada
- District: Nye County
- Range coordinates: 36°38′54″N 116°10′21″W
- Topo map: USGS Specter Range NW

The Specter Range is a small mountain range in southeastern Nye County, Nevada.

The southern margin of the range is bounded by the Amargosa Desert with the Funeral Mountains and Death Valley beyond. Yucca Mountain, Jackass Flat and Skull Mountain lie to the northwest and north across Rock Valley. The south boundary of Nevada Test Site lies on the northern slopes of the range. Mercury Valley and the town of Mercury lie to the northeast. The southeast end of the range is separated from the northwest end of the Spring Mountains by a narrow gap near Point of Rocks. U.S. Route 95 from Las Vegas passes between the two ranges and continues on past the southern margin of the Specter Range toward Beatty.

The range was so named on account of its "spectral" appearance.
