= Coffin corner =

Coffin corner may refer to:

- Coffin corner (aerodynamics), an unstable combination of speed and altitude
- A position in a bomber formation combat box
- Coffin corner (American football), a strategy used by a punter in American football
- The Coffin Corner, a magazine published by the Professional Football Researchers Association

== See also ==
- Coffins Corner, New Jersey
