= Goodsprings Cemetery (Nevada) =

Cemetery in Clark County, Nevada, United States

Coordinates: 35.82939°N 115.42769°W

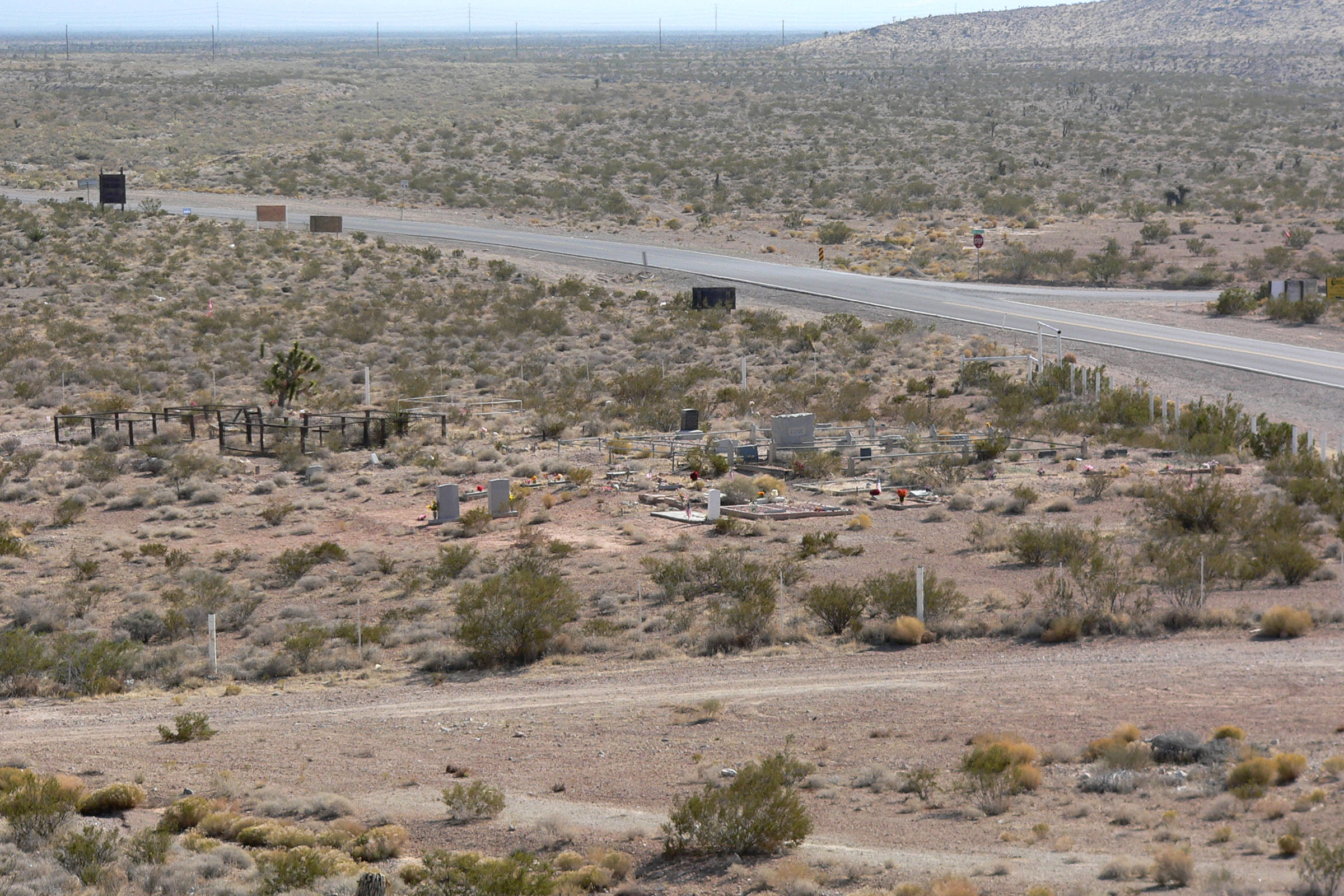
- Goodsprings Cemetery
- Interactive map of Goodsprings Cemetery

Details
- Established: c. 1890
- Location: Goodsprings, Nevada
- Size: 1.33 acres (0.54 ha)

The Goodsprings Cemetery consists of 1.33 acres (0.54 ha) and is an old, continuing cemetery located southwest of Las Vegas, Nevada seven miles (11 km) from Jean and just before entering the town of Goodsprings.

== History ==
The cemetery was in use long before A.J. Robbins donated the property to the town in 1913 with the earliest marked burial dating to December 27, 1890, for that of Anna Nimmer.

The cemetery has been investigated by the Las Vegas Society of Supernatural Investigations for signs of those who have left this mortal realm. Bigfoot's Pad Paranormal Team has investigated this location and others for signs of the paranormal since 2008.

== Interments ==
George Fayle, former Clark County Commission chairman, who built the Fayle Goodsprings Hotel in 1916, and Jean Fayle, for whom the town of Jean was named, are buried there along with many war veterans. Norman Price, who built the Goodsprings School, is also buried in this cemetery.

== In popular culture ==
The Goodsprings Cemetery appears in the 2010 video game Fallout: New Vegas, and is where the beginning of the game takes place. Its in-game appearance significantly differs from its real-life counterpart, however.
