= Delano Mountains =

Mountain range in Nevada, United States

- Location within Nevada

Highest point
- Elevation: 2,345 m (7,694 ft)

Geography
- Country: United States
- State: Nevada
- District: Elko County
- Range coordinates: 41°36′34.709″N 114°15′58.071″W
- Topo map: USGS Delano Peak

The Delano Mountains are a mountain range in Elko County, Nevada.
