= Clover Mountains =

Mountain range in Nevada, United States

- Location within Nevada

Highest point
- Elevation: 2,100 m (6,900 ft)

Geography
- Country: United States
- State: Nevada
- District: Lincoln County
- Range coordinates: 37°24′16.884″N 114°19′36.944″W
- Borders on: Meadow Valley Wash-SW, W & NW; Cedar Range-NE; Bull Valley Mountains-E; Tule Desert-SW, S & SE
- Topo map: USGS Fife Mountain

The Clover Mountains are a mountain range in Lincoln County, Nevada.

The Clover Mountains Wilderness makes up a large part of the mountain range.

The Clover Mountains are the southern mountains on the east perimeter of the Meadow Valley Wash watershed.

Preceded by –NORTH– Cedar; Range	Clover; Mountains _____; Great; Basin; Divide	Succeeded by –EAST– Utah state-line (Bull-Valley; Mtns)

== See also ==
- List of Great Basin Divide border landforms of Nevada
- Great Basin Divide
