= South Pahroc Range =

Mountain range in Nevada, United States

- Location within Nevada

Highest point
- Elevation: 2,393 m (7,851 ft)

Geography
- Country: United States
- State: Nevada
- District: Lincoln County
- Range coordinates: 37°28′59.862″N 115°1′48.049″W
- Topo map: USGS Alamo NE

The South Pahroc Range is a mountain range in Lincoln County, Nevada.
