= Goodsprings Schoolhouse =

- U.S. National Register of Historic Places
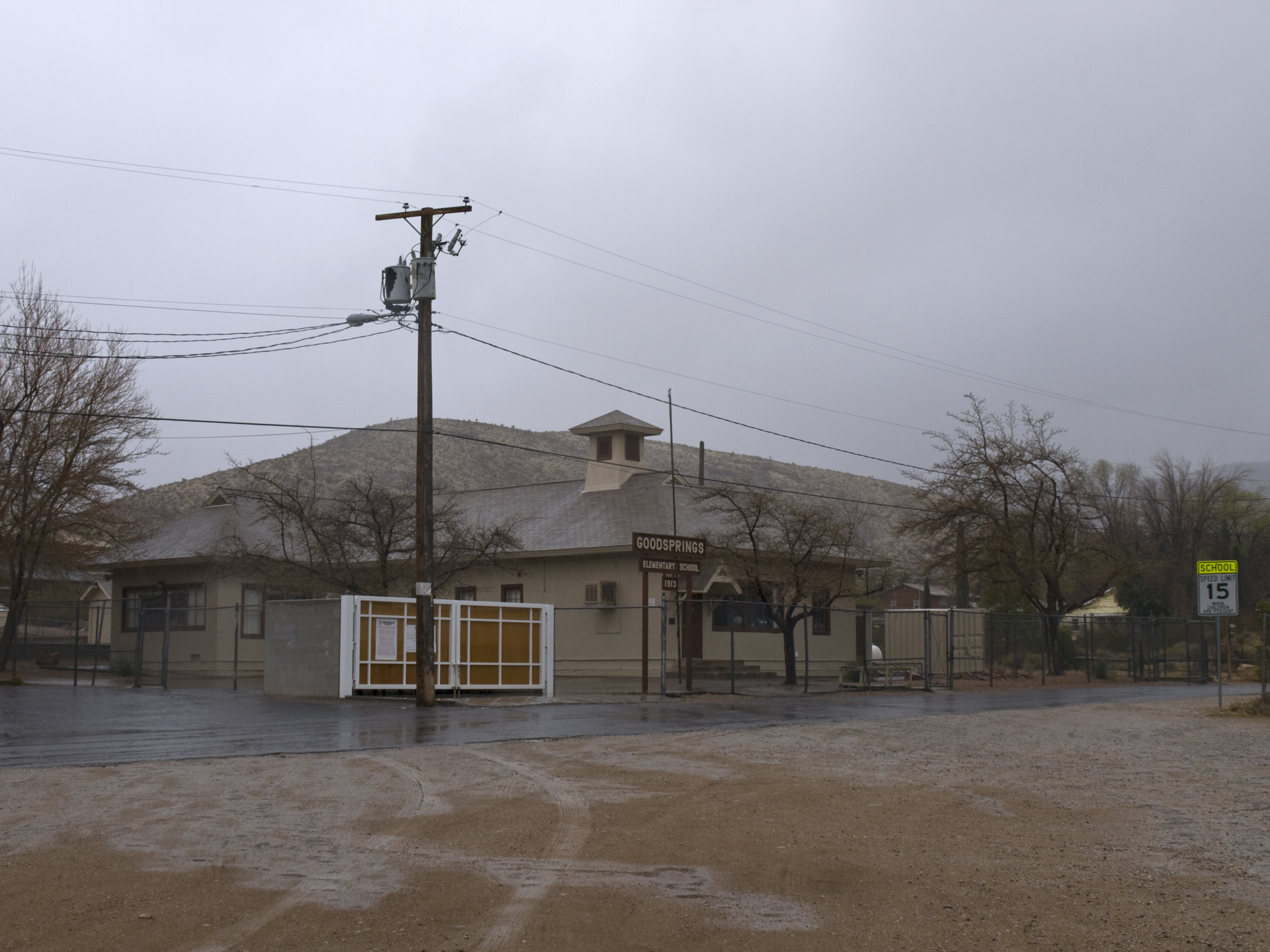
- Location: San Pedro Ave. E of jct. with Esmeralda St; Goodsprings, Nevada
- Coordinates: 35°49′53.8″N 115°26′08.07″W
- Built: 1913
- Architect: C. W. Price
- Architectural style: Colonial Revival
- MPS: Historic School Buildings in the Evolution of the Fifth Supervision School District MPS
- NRHP reference No.: 92000121
- Added to NRHP: March 10, 1992

Goodsprings Schoolhouse, built in the Colonial Revival style, is located in Goodsprings, Nevada, and is listed on the United States National Register of Historic Places.

== History ==
The school was designed by C.W. Price, built by Norman Price in 1913 and opened in September 1913.

The site was listed as a School District MPS in the National Register of Historic Places on March 10, 1992.

It was announced in 2026 that the 2025-2026 school year would be the last year for enrolled students and that the two remaining enrolled students, as well as future students, would attend Sandy Valley School.
