= Roach, Nevada =

Ghost town in Clark County, Nevada, United States

Roach
- Ghost town
- Location within Nevada
- Country: United States
- State: Nevada
- County: Clark
- Founded: circa 1902; 124 years ago
- Elevation: 2,620 ft (800 m)

Population (1940)
  - Total: 10
- Time zone: UTC-8 (PST)
  - Summer (DST): UTC-7 (PDT)

Roach is a ghost town and railroad siding in Clark County, Nevada, United States. It is located along the Union Pacific Railroad, between Jean, Nevada and Nipton, California.

== History ==
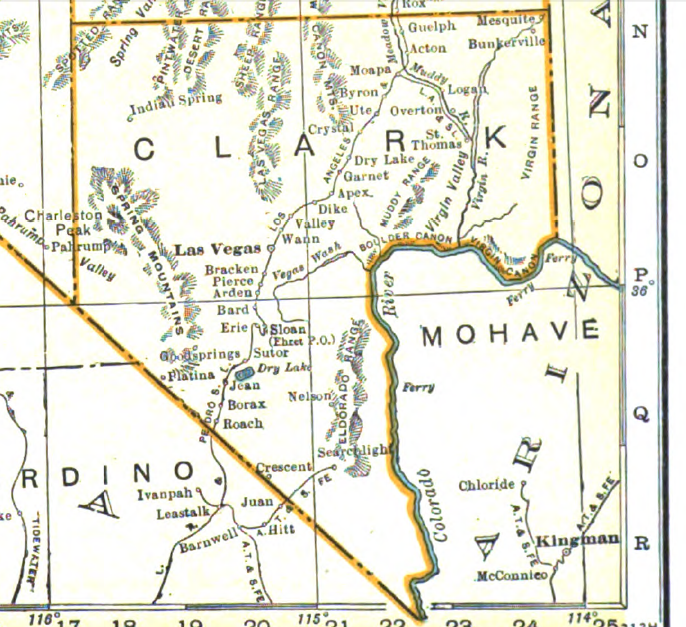
Clark County, Nevada, in 1925

Roach was settled between 1902 and 1905. In 1904, a tractor road from the Mesquite Valley through State Line Pass to Roach was built, "largely to haul borax from the Death Valley region; but it also served to permit easy shipment of the ores from mines in the southwestern part" of the Goodsprings Mining District. Roach became a major shipping point on the San Pedro, Los Angeles and Salt Lake (SPLA & SL) Railroad, with "considerable tonnage" being shipped through Roach around 1913, along with nearby Jean and Arden.

The Roach Station was the closest rail site to the Milford-Addison group of mines c. 1915. Around that time, lead-zinc ore was also mined at the Mobile Mine, owned by a Los Angeles syndicate, and shipped to Los Angeles via the station at Roach.

In 1915, about 500 tons of zinc carbonite ore were being transported each month via trucks from the Green Monster Mine to Roach. The following year, the Mojave Tungsten Company planned to build a tungsten plant 20 miles west of Roach, with L.L. Draper as the superintendent.

Roach was noted as the site of a 1916 record-breaking event. Roy Sorenson and Fred Piehl, leaseholders on the Addison Mine, hired a team to haul 55 tons of zinc to the station at Roach, which the Goldfield News declared a hauling record. The team worked continuously for almost 42 hours to deposit the ore before Sorenson and Piehl's lease on the mine expired.

By the 1920s, Roach was still considered an "important" shipping point on the rail line. The Las Vegas Aviation Club offered landings at Roach around 1921.

Roach had a population of 10 residents c. 1940.

Roach appears on, and is the namesake for, the USGS Roach 7.5' topographic map (1985).

== Geography ==
Roach is on the eastern shoreline of Roach Dry Lake and has an elevation of 2,620 feet (800 m).

== See also ==
- Saint Joseph, Nevada
