= Widow maker =

Widow maker, widow-maker or widowmaker may refer to:

== Common usage ==
- Widowmaker (forestry), any loose overhead debris such as limbs or tree tops that may fall at any time
- Widow maker (medicine), a nickname used to describe a highly stenotic left main coronary artery or proximal left anterior descending (LAD) coronary artery of the heart, which is very often fatal

== Entertainment ==
=== Film and television ===
- K-19: The Widowmaker, a 2002 historical submarine film
- Widowmaker Cave, a fictional cave in the Northern Exposure episode "The Final Frontier"
- The Widowmaker, a 1990 TV drama by John Madden
- "Widowmaker" (American Dad!), a season 4 episode of American Dad!

=== Books and Comics ===
- Widowmaker (Marvel Comics), a 2010–2011 four-issue comic book limited series
- The Widowmaker, a 1996 science-fiction novel by Mike Resnick

=== Characters ===
- Widowmaker (Image Comics), an assassin from the comic book series Noble Causes
- Widow-Maker, Pecos Bill's horse in American folklore
- Widowmaker, a military unit in Resistance: Fall of Man and Resistance 3
- Widow-maker, a Decepticon heavy from Marvel's Transformers franchise
- Widowmaker (Overwatch), a character from the 2016 video game
- The Widowmaker, an ace starfighter pilot in the video game Colony Wars: Vengeance

=== Music ===
- Widowmaker (British band), a British hard rock band
  - Widowmaker (album), a 1976 album by Widowmaker
- Widowmaker (American band), an American band
- Widow Maker, a 1964 album and song by Jimmy Martin
- Widowmaker, a 2012 album by Dragged into Sunlight
- "The Widow Maker", a 1974 song by Robert Calvert from Captain Lockheed and the Starfighters
- "Widowmaker", a 1983 song by Pantera from Metal Magic
- "Widowmaker", a 1985 song by W.A.S.P. from The Last Command
- The Widowmaker, an album and song by Canadian singer-songwriter Donovan Woods
- "Widowmaker", a 2017 song by The Black Dahlia Murder from Nightbringers

== Vehicles and weaponry ==
=== Aircraft and Vehicles ===
- Widowmaker, the Porsche 930 Turbo, a sports car with a proclivity to spin during aggressive driving
- Widowmaker, the Kawasaki H2 Mach IV motorbike
- Widowmaker, the Martin B-26 Marauder, a medium bomber that was unforgiving at low airspeed in its early versions
- Widowmaker, the Lockheed F-104 Starfighter, an interceptor aircraft with unforgiving flying qualities
- Widow maker, the McDonnell Douglas AV-8B Harrier II, a V/STOL ground-attack aircraft with a high takeoff and landing accident rate

=== Firearms ===
- Widowmaker, the ArmaLite AR-18 assault rifle
- Widowmaker, the Winchester Model 1911 shotgun

== Other uses ==
- Widowmaker hill climb, a motorcycle/snowmobile sporting event in Croydon, Utah
- Widowmaker, the bowsprit, a part of a sailing ship
- Widowmaker, African buffalo
- Widowmaker, Astelia hastata, an epiphyte plant
- The Widowmaker, Delamar, Nevada, a former town
- The Widowmaker, ring name of professional wrestler Barry Windham

== See also ==
- Window Maker
