= Snake Mountains =

Mountain range in Elko County, Nevada, United States

- Snake Mountain, July 2015

Highest point
- Elevation: 2,603 m (8,540 ft)

Geography
- Location within Nevada
- Country: United States
- State: Nevada
- District: Elko County
- Range coordinates: 41°33′46.691″N 115°3′18.184″W
- Topo map: USGS Stormy Peak

The Snake Mountains are a mountain range in Elko County, Nevada, United States. There are 11 named mountains in the Snake Mountains. The highest and the most prominent mountain is Antelope Peak.

== See also ==
- List of mountain ranges of Nevada
