= Goodsprings, Nevada =

- Unincorporated community
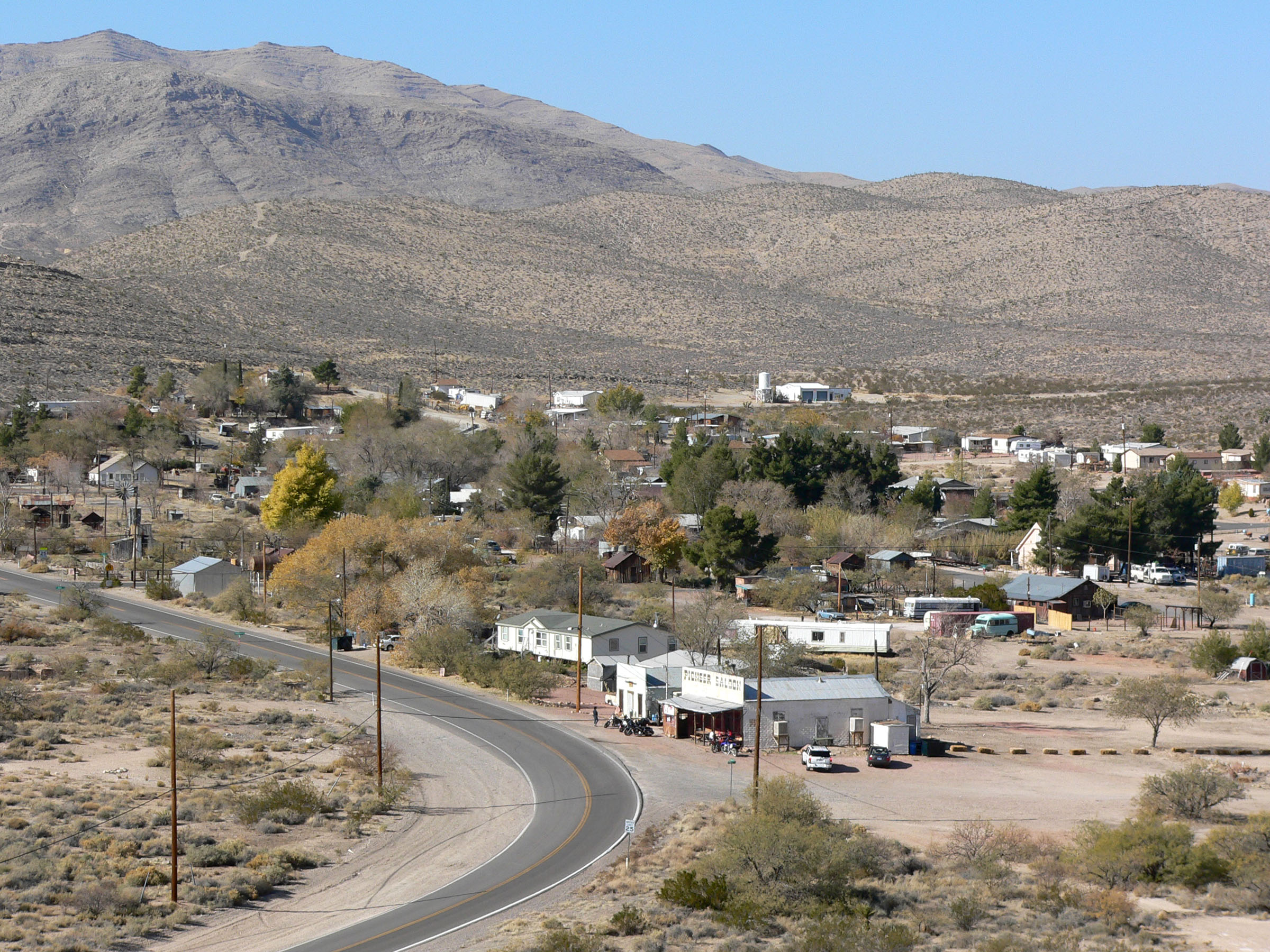
- The town of Goodsprings, Nevada on November 26, 2006

- Location of Goodsprings in Clark County, Nevada

- Location in the United States
- Coordinates: 35°49′55″N 115°26′07″W
- Country: United States
- State: Nevada
- County: Clark
- Founded: 1900; 126 years ago
- Named for: Joseph Good

Area
  - Total: 0.98 sq mi (2.53 km^{2})
  - Land: 0.98 sq mi (2.53 km^{2})
  - Water: 0 sq mi (0.00 km^{2})
- Elevation: 3,717 ft (1,133 m)

Population (2020)
  - Total: 162
  - Density: 165.8/sq mi (64.03/km^{2})
- Time zone: UTC-8 (PST)
  - Summer (DST): UTC-7 (PDT)
- ZIP code: 89019
- Area codes: 702 and 725
- FIPS code: 32-29500
- GNIS feature ID: 2408308

Nevada Historical Marker
- Reference no.: 102

Goodsprings is an unincorporated community in Clark County, Nevada, United States. The Pioneer Saloon and the Goodsprings Schoolhouse were both built in 1913 and are still in use to this day. The town was once a prosperous mining town before seeing a significant decline in the population. The population was 162 as of the 2020 census. Due to this, Goodsprings has been characterized as a ghost town.

== History ==
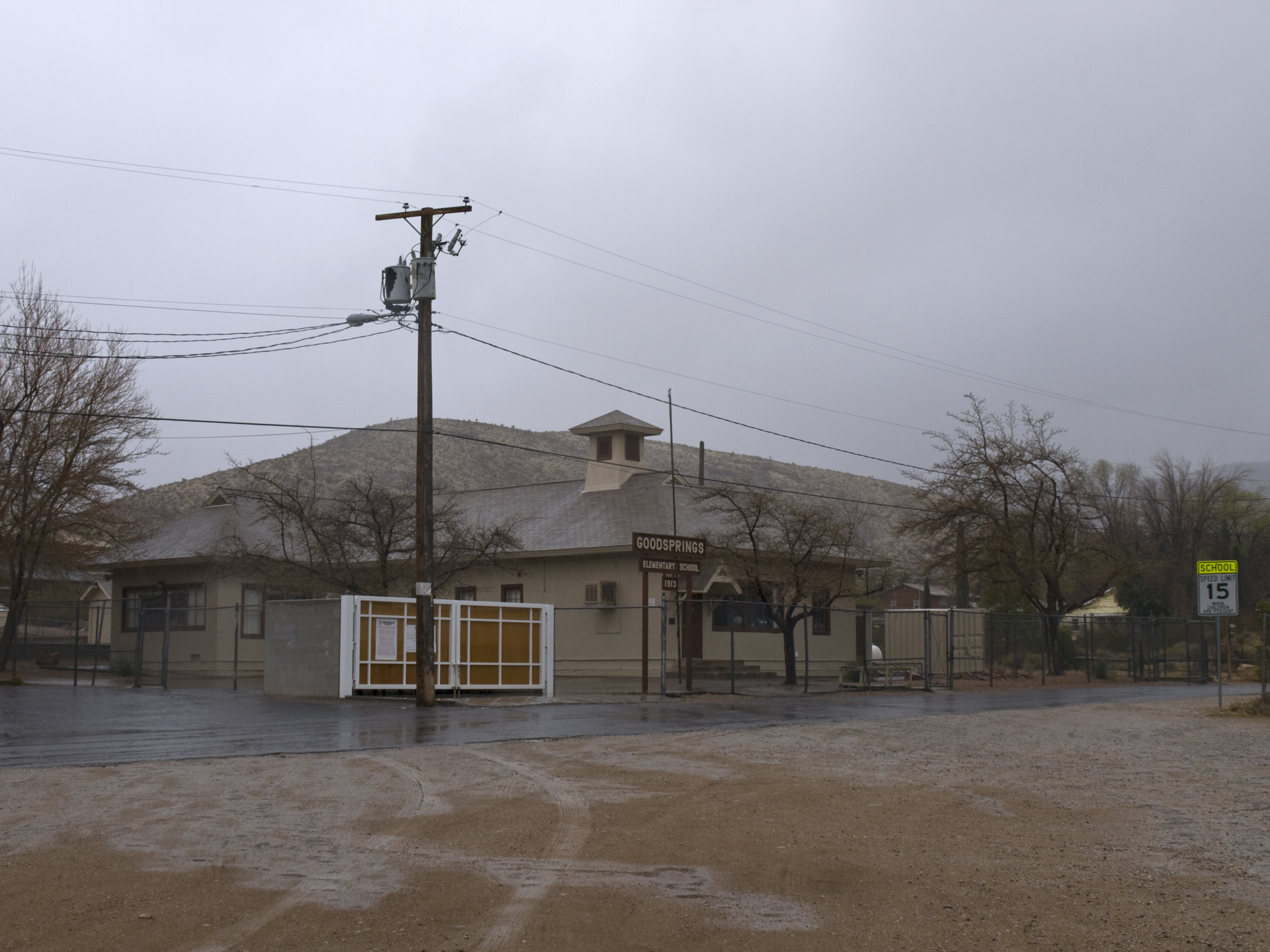
Goodsprings Schoolhouse was built in 1913

The town was named for cattle rancher Joseph Good, whose cattle frequented a spring nestled in the southeastern foothills of the Spring Mountains. Mormon miners discovered lead at Potosi Mountain in 1856. Gold was first discovered in the region in 1893. Goodsprings was once the heart of the most productive mining districts in Clark County. Over the years, lead, silver, copper, zinc and gold have all been mined from this area.

Before 1900, a small cluster of tent cabins and a mill were erected, as well as a post office. Lincoln County established Goodsprings Township. In 1904, Salt Lake City mining interests platted the Goodsprings Township. Most early buildings in the town were constructed during the boom spurred by the railroad in 1910–1911.

After a number of moves, the current Goodsprings Schoolhouse was erected in 1913. Now on the National Register of Historic Places, it is the oldest school in Clark County that was built as a school. In 2009 citing costs, the school was nearly shut down. By 2016, the school had only around 10 students.In 2026 the school had its final school year and remaining students would attend Sandy Valley School.

The town boasted a population of 800 by 1918. Lead mining increased during World War 1 to produce ammunition. However, after World War I, mining slowed and families moved away. World War II created a second boom, but it too slowed after the war ended. The town's population has dwindled to approximately 200.

During the 1950s, atomic testing took place in the area.

Several fires destroyed buildings in the city, including a 1966 fire which destroyed the local Fayle Hotel. The Goodsprings Historical Society has attempted to preserve and restore local buildings by making repairs to the roofs.

== Pioneer Saloon ==
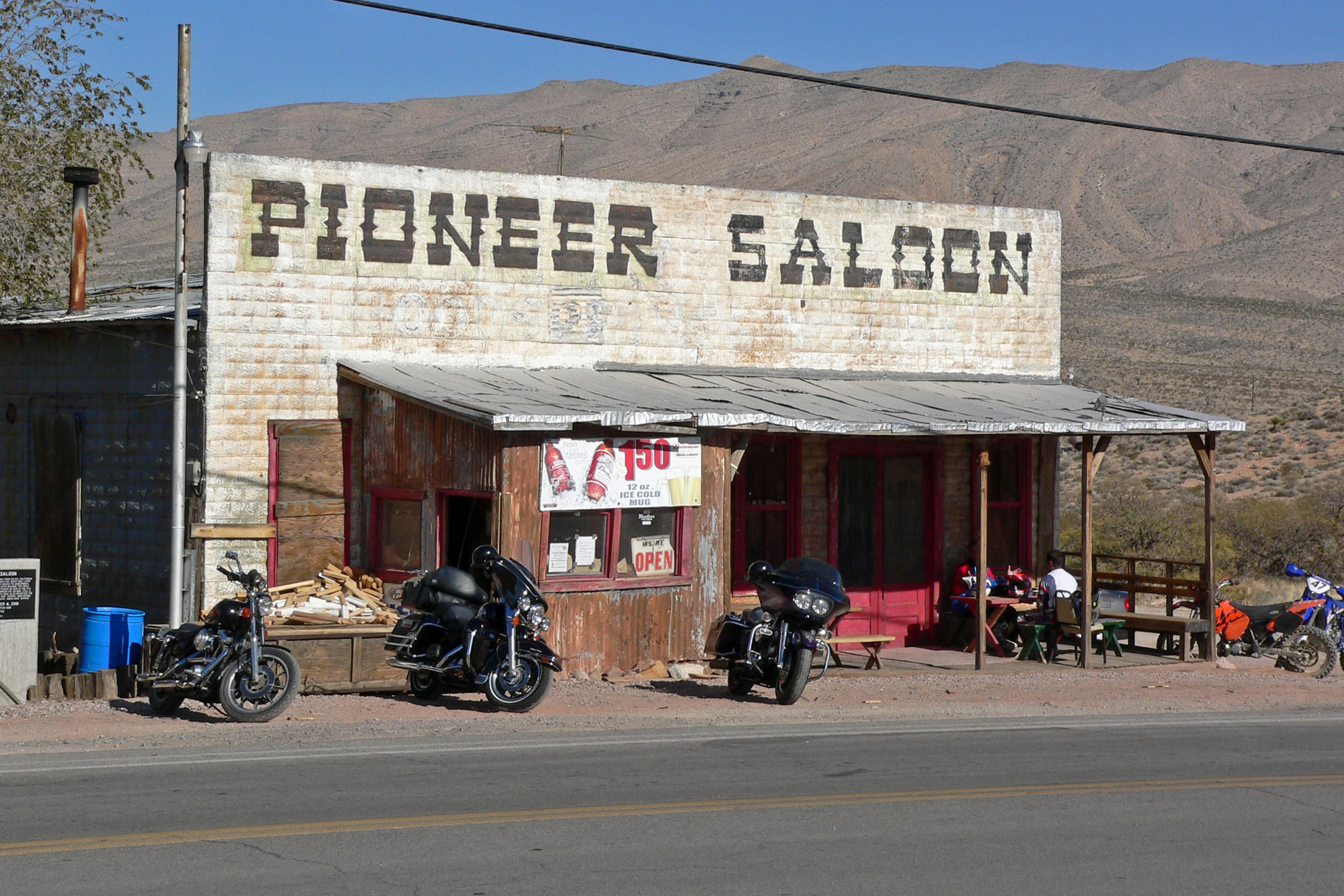
The Pioneer Saloon, pictured in 2006.

Goodsprings is the home of the Pioneer Saloon, which opened in 1913 and is considered to be one of the oldest saloons in Nevada. The walls of the saloon are made out of pressed tin. On June 27, 1915, a dispute over a card game between Paul Coski and miner Joe Armstrong resulted in Armstrong firing twice at Coski, killing him. Armstrong was initially exonerated of wrongdoing by coroner's jury on the basis of self-defense. He was subsequently put on trial and found not-guilty according to Reno Gazette-Journal on the basis that "he had never been a quarrelsome man, and had a splendid record". The contemporary saloon showcases two holes in the wall that it says were bullet holes from the shooting with a local newspaper article explaining the case.

The Pioneer Saloon and several other locations around Las Vegas were raided in 1924 by regulatory officers in violation of prohibition banning the sale of alcohol.

In addition, the Pioneer Saloon has a small memorial to Carole Lombard and her husband Clark Gable. Lombard's plane TWA Flight 3 crashed into nearby Potosi Mountain on January 16, 1942, resulting in the death of all 22 people on board, including Lombard's mother and press agent. The saloon and hotel were the centers of operations for the search in the aftermath of the accident.

A new owner purchased the saloon in 2006, and put around 2 million dollars renovating the building. The Pioneer Saloon was purchased in 2021 for 1.5 million dollars after the previous owner had owned it for 15 years.

The saloon has also been used as a filming location for film productions such as Fear and Loathing in Las Vegas, and Miss Congeniality as well as the reality television series Ghost Adventures. This saloon appeared in several films and TV series, such as The Twilight Zone, The Misfits, and Cherry 2000. The town also features prominently in the 2010 video game Fallout: New Vegas. The saloon, which is re-created accurately in the videogame, has a small corner dedicated to the game. Since 2022, the saloon has hosted a yearly festival, drawing thousands of Fallout fans from around the world to Goodsprings.

== Energy production ==
The Goodsprings Waste Heat Recovery Station opened in 2010, providing 7.5MW of energy from waste heat produced at a Kern River Pipeline compressor station. The plant is owned and operated by NV Energy and is the first renewable energy plant owned by the company. The plant which cost $22 million was constructed by Ormat Technologies construction began in March 2010 and began operations in November of that year.

== Geography ==
Goodsprings is in the Goodsprings Valley of southern Nevada. The Bird Spring Range lies to the northeast with Las Vegas beyond. The community is on Nevada State Route 161 five miles northeast of Jean and Interstate 15.

According to the United States Census Bureau, the census-designated place (CDP) of Goodsprings has a total area of 1.5 square miles (3.9 km^{2}), all of it land.

=== Climate ===
Goodsprings experiences an arid climate with long, hot summers, and mild winters.

Climate data for Goodsprings, Nevada (elevation 3,707 ft)
| Month | Jan | Feb | Mar | Apr | May | Jun | Jul | Aug | Sep | Oct | Nov | Dec | Year |
|---|---|---|---|---|---|---|---|---|---|---|---|---|---|
| Record high °F (°C) | 73 (23) | 75 (24) | 86 (30) | 95 (35) | 108 (42) | 112 (44) | 115 (46) | 113 (45) | 105 (41) | 95 (35) | 81 (27) | 68 (20) | 115 (46) |
| Mean daily maximum °F (°C) | 55.2 (12.9) | 58.1 (14.5) | 67.0 (19.4) | 74.9 (23.8) | 88.8 (31.6) | 98.0 (36.7) | 101.8 (38.8) | 99.4 (37.4) | 91.9 (33.3) | 77.3 (25.2) | 63.7 (17.6) | 53.4 (11.9) | 77.4 (25.2) |
| Mean daily minimum °F (°C) | 31.8 (−0.1) | 34.3 (1.3) | 39.0 (3.9) | 44.1 (6.7) | 54.0 (12.2) | 61.5 (16.4) | 68.8 (20.4) | 66.6 (19.2) | 60.5 (15.8) | 49.9 (9.9) | 38.1 (3.4) | 31.7 (−0.2) | 48.4 (9.1) |
| Record low °F (°C) | 9 (−13) | 14 (−10) | 21 (−6) | 25 (−4) | 36 (2) | 41 (5) | 55 (13) | 48 (9) | 42 (6) | 31 (−1) | 16 (−9) | 13 (−11) | 9 (−13) |
| Average precipitation inches (mm) | 0.90 (23) | 1.63 (41) | 0.47 (12) | 0.45 (11) | 0.04 (1.0) | 0.02 (0.51) | 0.55 (14) | 0.54 (14) | 0.30 (7.6) | 0.67 (17) | 0.33 (8.4) | 0.91 (23) | 6.82 (173) |
| Average snowfall inches (cm) | 0.4 (1.0) | 0.8 (2.0) | 0.2 (0.51) | 0 (0) | 0 (0) | 0 (0) | 0 (0) | 0 (0) | 0 (0) | 0 (0) | 0 (0) | 2.3 (5.8) | 3.7 (9.4) |
Source: The Western Regional Climate Center

== Demographics ==
Historical population
| Census | Pop. | Note | %± |
|---|---|---|---|
| 2020 | 162 | | — |
U.S. Decennial Census

As of the census of 2000, there were 232 people, 107 households, and 63 families residing in the CDP. The population density was 155.7 inhabitants per square mile (60.1/km^{2}). There were 122 housing units at an average density of 81.9 per square mile (31.6/km^{2}). The racial makeup of the CDP was 89.66% White, 1.72% African American, 0.43% Native American, 1.72% from other races, and 6.47% from two or more races. Hispanic or Latino of any race were 4.74% of the population.

There were 107 households, out of which 20.6% had children under the age of 18 living with them, 45.8% were married couples living together, 11.2% had a female householder with no husband present, and 40.2% were non-families. 35.5% of all households were made up of individuals, and 13.1% had someone living alone who was 65 years of age or older. The average household size was 2.17 and the average family size was 2.83.

In the CDP, the population was spread out, with 22.8% under the age of 18, 3.0% from 18 to 24, 22.8% from 25 to 44, 28.9% from 45 to 64, and 22.4% who were 65 years of age or older. The median age was 46 years. For every 100 females, there were 90.2 males. For every 100 females age 18 and over, there were 105.7 males.

The median income for a household in the CDP was $40,430, and the median income for a family was $58,125. Males had a median income of $35,924 versus $28,594 for females. The per capita income for the CDP was $22,282. None of the families and 9.2% of the population were living below the poverty line, including no under eighteens and 19.6% of those over 64.

== Education ==
Goodsprings has a public library, a branch of the Las Vegas-Clark County Library District.
