= East Mormon Mountains =

Mountain range in Nevada, United States

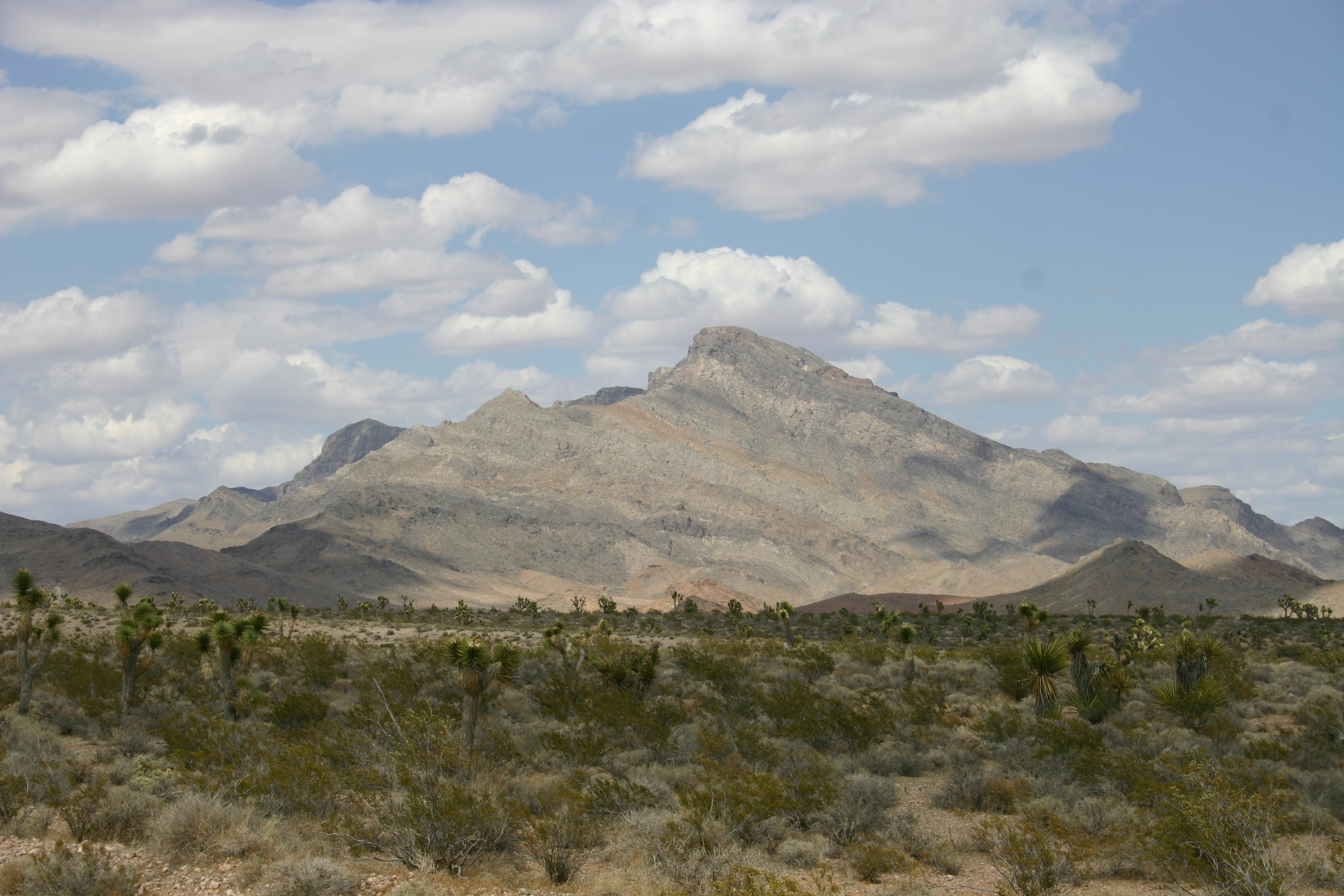
- East Mormon Mountains

Highest point
- Elevation: 1,471 m (4,826 ft)

Geography
- Location within Nevada
- Country: United States
- State: Nevada
- District: Lincoln County
- Range coordinates: 36°55′54.900″N 114°18′39.928″W
- Topo map: USGS Davidson Peak

The East Mormon Mountains is a mountain range in Lincoln County, Nevada. As their name implies, they are east of the Mormon Mountains.
