= Bird Spring Range =

Mountain range in Nevada, United States

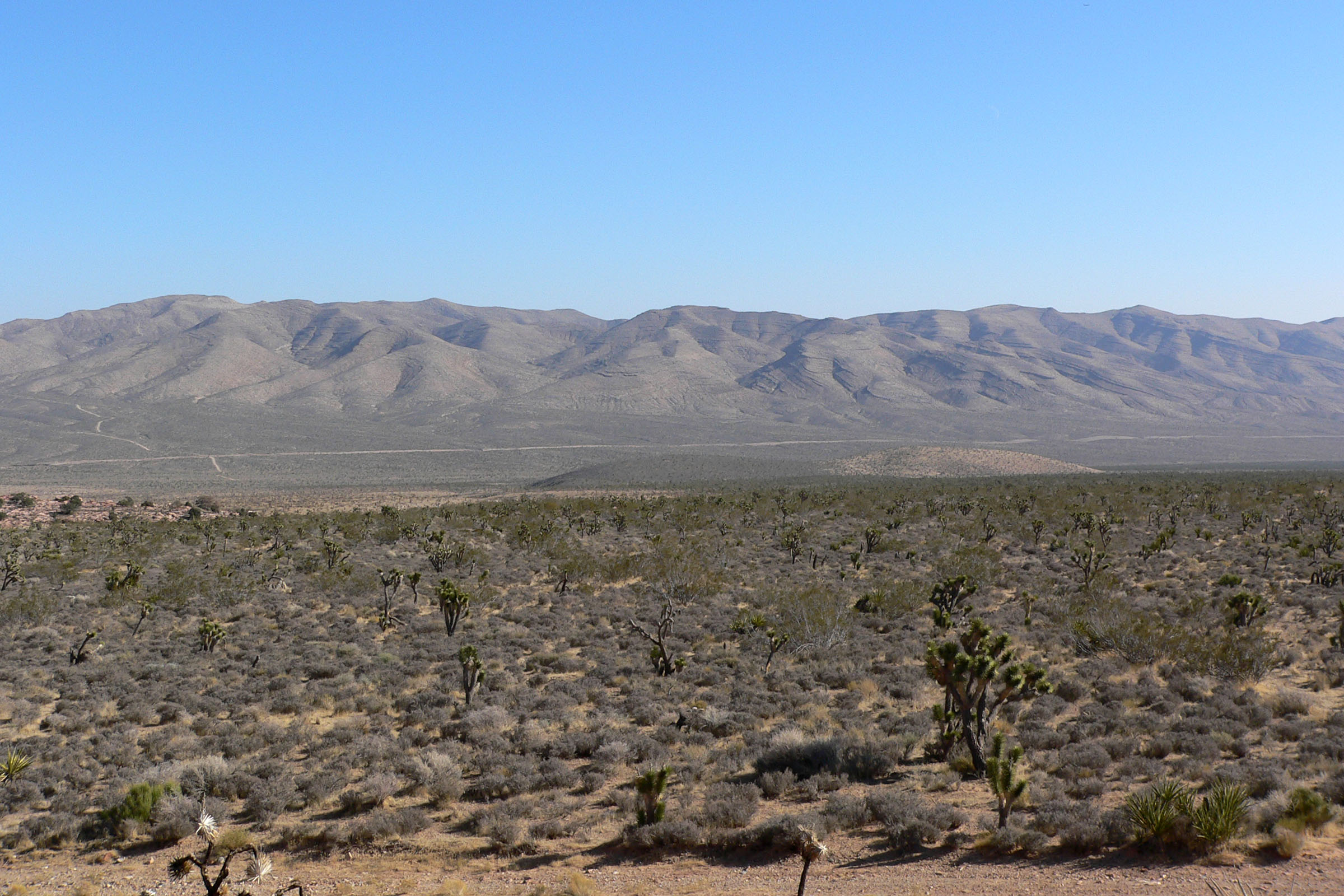
- View from the west

Highest point
- Elevation: 1,511 m (4,957 ft)

Geography
- Location within Nevada
- Country: United States
- State: Nevada
- District: Clark County
- Range coordinates: 35°54′29″N 115°24′0″W
- Topo map: USGS Cottonwood Pass

The Bird Spring Range is a mountain range in Clark County, Nevada.
