= Meadow Valley Wash =

Southern Nevada stream

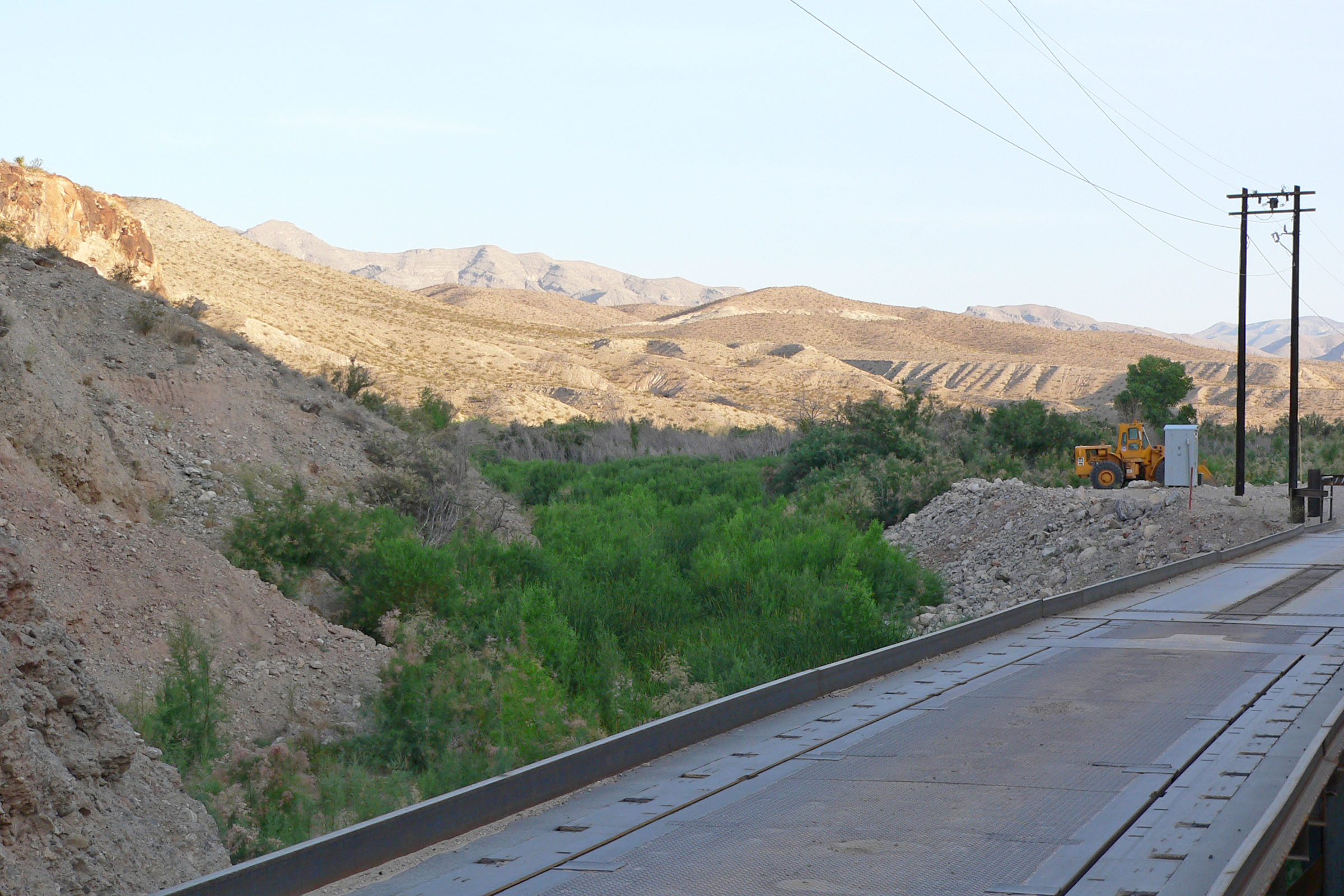
- The wash at the Union Pacific gate, north of Moapa

- Location of the mouth of Meadow Valley Wash in Nevada

Location
- Country: United States
- State: Nevada
- Region: Lower Colorado-Lake Mead subregion
- Counties: Lincoln, Clark

Physical characteristics
- Source
  - coordinates: 38.1913492°N 114.1874827°W
- Mouth: Muddy River
  - coordinates: 36.6638612°N 114.5719316°W
- Basin size: 2,840 sq mi (7,400 km^{2})

The Meadow Valley Wash is a southern Nevada stream draining the Meadow Watershed that is bordered on three sides by the Great Basin Divide. The wash's Lincoln County head point is in the Wilson Creek Range, and the wash includes two upper confluences (e.g., the Patterson Wash). Panaca is along the upper wash, and downstream of Caliente is the wash's confluence with its east fork. Just before the junction with the Muddy River, the wash flows from Lincoln County into northeastern Clark County. It flows into the Muddy in the Moapa Valley just west of Glendale adjacent to Interstate 15 approximately 40 miles (64 km) northeast of Las Vegas.

In addition to the Wilson Creek Range, the watershed's drainage divide is in the Delamar Mountains (to the west) and the Meadow Valley Range (east). The northern tip of the watershed is a triple watershed point with two Great Basin subregions: the Central Nevada Desert Basins and the Escalante-Sevier subregion.

== History ==
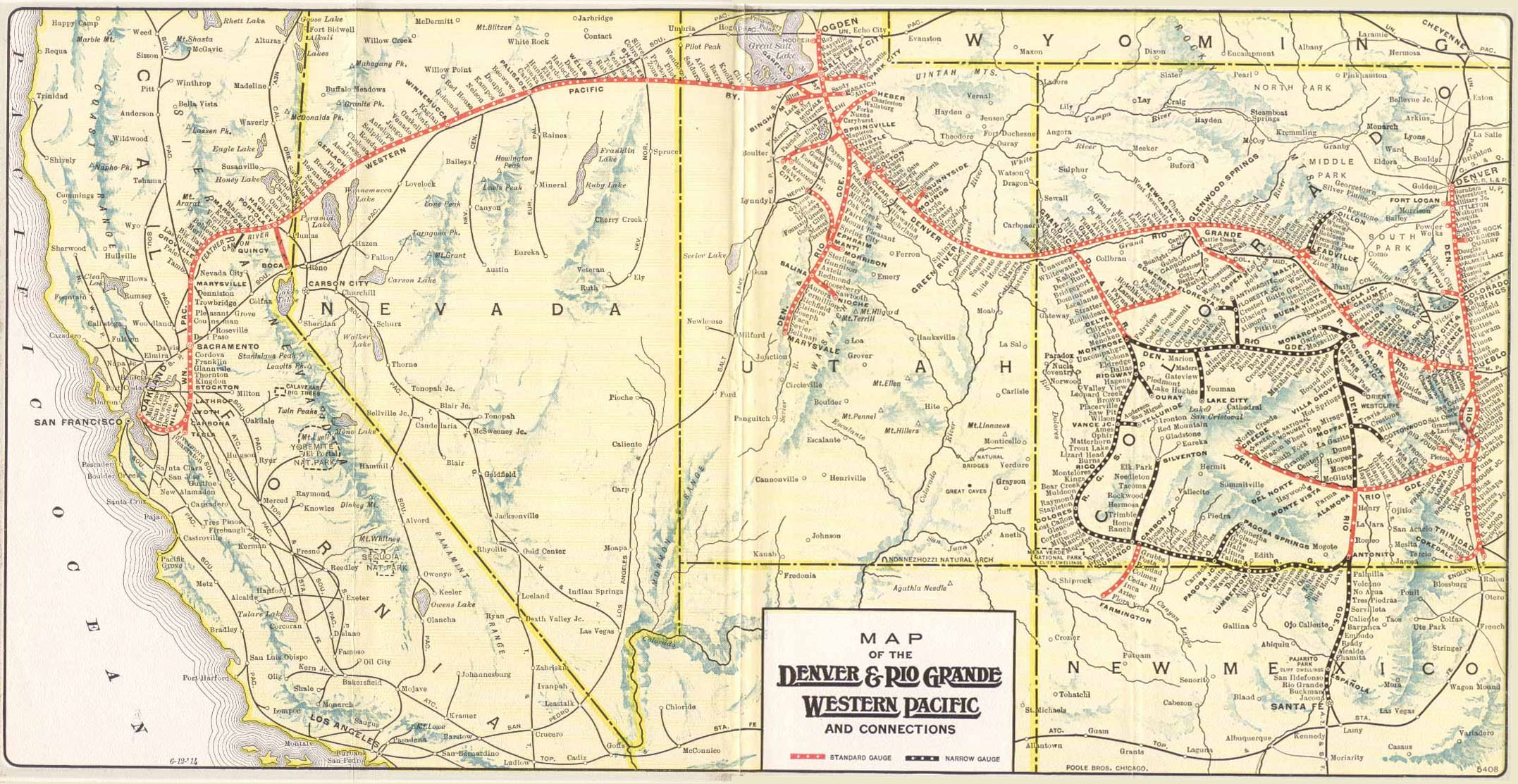
1914 railroad map showing Pioche. (Expandable photo in WikiCommons)

William Andrews Clark's 1903–1910 railroad that linked Pioche and Panaca operated through the wash until washed out by flooding.
