= Great Basin Divide =

Hydrological divide in western United States bounding a large endorheic basin

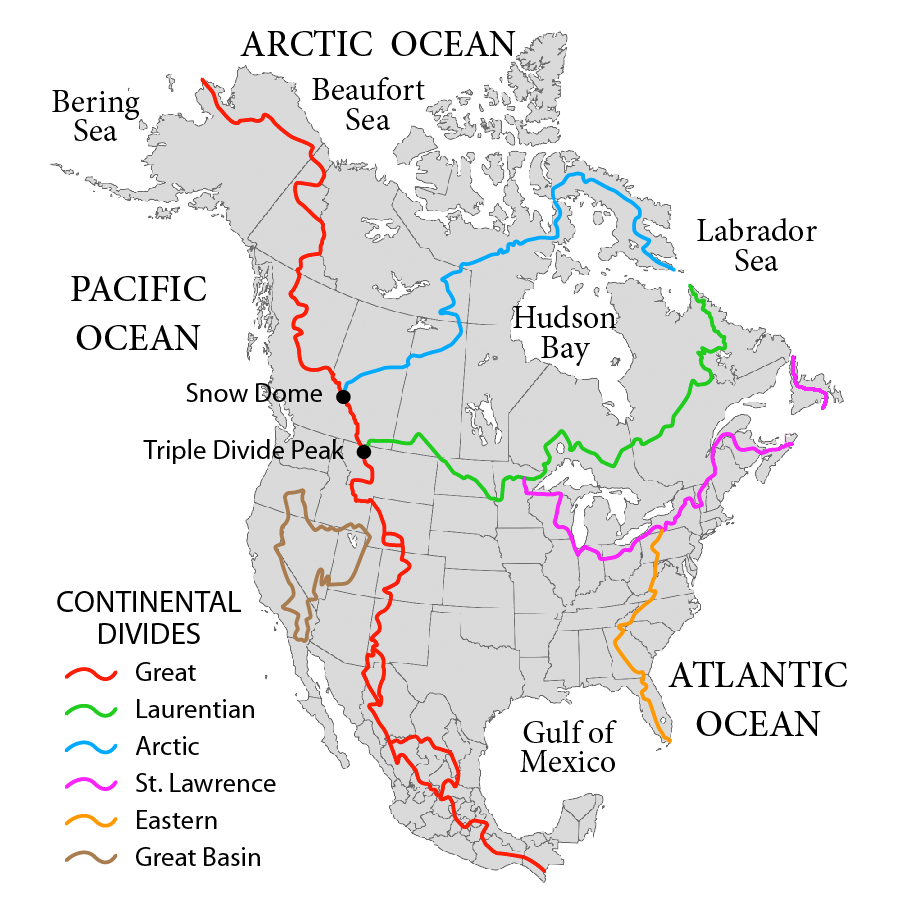
- The Great Basin Divide (shown as the brown line on the map) demarcates the Great Basin.

Geography
- Countries: United States and Mexico
- Parent range: North America

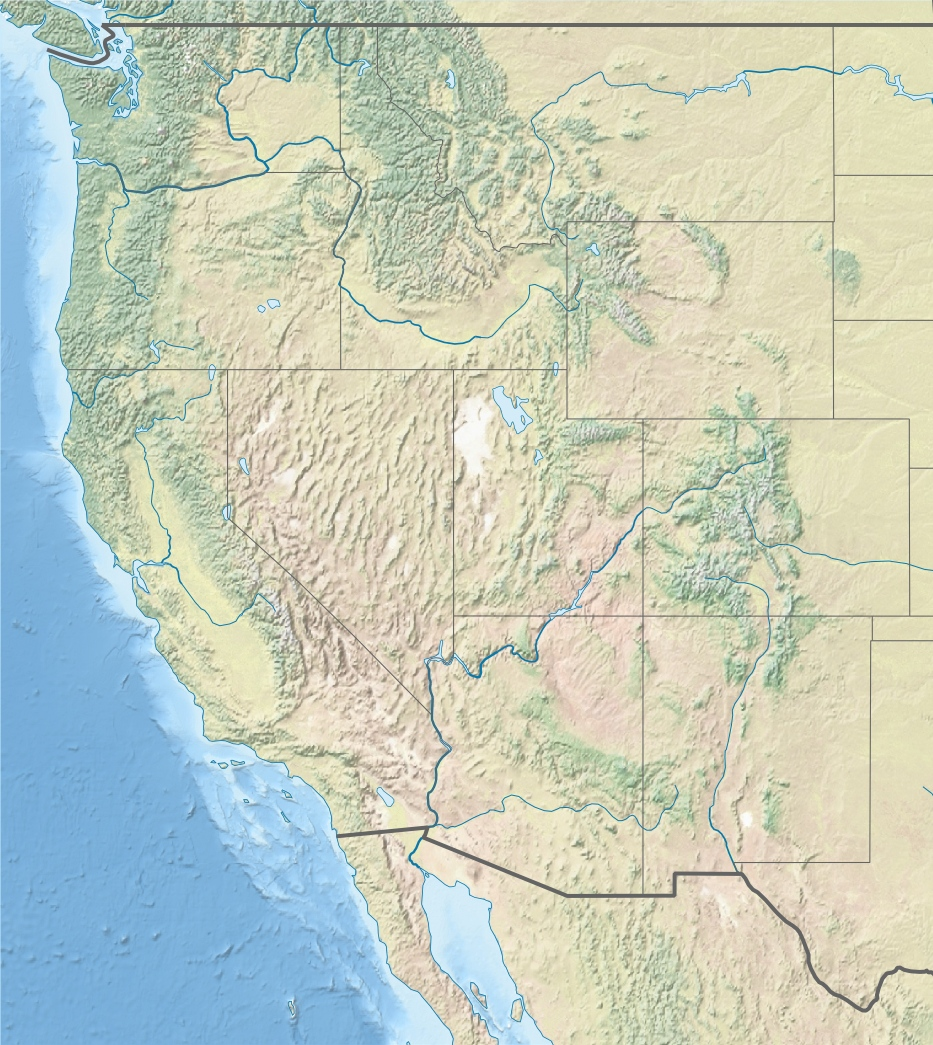
Great Basin Divide
-triple pt, -overflow pt, -border, -other

The Great Basin Divide in the western United States is the ridgeline that separates the Great Basin from the Pacific Ocean watershed, which completely surrounds it.

The Great Basin is the largest set of contiguous endorheic watersheds of North America, including six entire USGS watershed subregions. It contains the watersheds of several large prehistoric and still-existing lakes, most notably Lake Bonneville, Lake Lahontan, Lake Manly, and the Salton Sea. As such, it occupies most of present-day Nevada, about half of Utah, large parts of eastern California and Oregon, and small parts of Idaho, Wyoming, and Baja California. The arid climate of this area ensures that none of the major lake basins are filled to overflowing, and thus no precipitation falling into them reaches the sea.

Precipitation falling on the exterior of the Great Basin Divide does (if not evaporated or consumed on the way) reach the Pacific Ocean, through a number of different channels. Roughly speaking, the area to the north and northeast of the Great Basin drains into the Columbia River, mostly via the Snake River. Likewise, the area to the south and southeast drains into the Colorado River, a good part of it via the Green River. The area west of the Great Basin is drained by the Klamath River, the Central Valley of California (Sacramento and San Joaquin Rivers), and various small rivers of southern California and northern Baja California.
