= Penstemon nanus =

- Near the Wah Wah Mountains, Beaver County, Utah

Conservation status
- Vulnerable (NatureServe)

Scientific classification
- Kingdom: Plantae
- Clade: Tracheophytes
- Clade: Angiosperms
- Clade: Eudicots
- Clade: Asterids
- Order: Lamiales
- Family: Plantaginaceae
- Genus: Penstemon
- Species: P. nanus

Binomial name
- Penstemon nanus D.D.Keck

Plant species in the veronica family

Penstemon nanus, the dwarf penstemon, is a rare species in the veronica family that only grows wild in two counties in western Utah.

== Description ==
Dwarf penstemon is a small perennial plant, only growing 2 to 14 centimeters (1–5.5 in) tall, and rarely exceeding 10 cm (4 in). It grows herbaceous flowering stems from a branching, thick caudex atop a taproot. The stems are few to numerous, uniformly and thickly covered in hairs making them look like they are covered in ashes, and lean out from the base of the plant, sometimes curving to grow upwards.

Plants have both basal leaves and ones attached to the stems, that are not leathery, densely covered in stiff backwards pointing hairs, and usually have smooth edges, but occasionally have a few uneven teeth. Most of the leaves are basal, crowding close together, and have a short leaf stalk, as do the lowest ones on the stems. The lowest stem leaves and the basal ones are usually 1.2–3.5 centimeters long, but can reach 5 cm, but with a width of just 0.3–1 cm. They are spatulate to narrowly oblanceolate in shape, with a narrow to blunt point. The stems have two to six leaves attached in pairs to opposite sides, the upper ones with a tapering base directly attached to the main stem or slightly clasping it. They are narrowly oblanceolate to lanceolate.

The flowers are typically violet, ranging from blue to purple with darker reddish-violet floral guide lines; they rarely can be pink or albino. The petals are fused below into a funnel shaped tube and open to five almost equal sized lobes, with an overall length of 1–2 cm, though 1.2–1.7 cm is more typical. The exterior of the flower is covered in glandular hairs while the interior has sparse yellowish hairs on the lower side of the tube. The stamens do not extend out of the flowers, but the staminode might reach the flower's mouth and is 8–9 mm long. It is moderately to densely covered in orange hairs, 0.8 mm long.

It is very similar to Penstemon dolius, but that species has widely spreading pollen sacs that split the full length and an inflorescence that is covered in ashy hairs that are not glandular. In contrast dwarf penstemons have horseshoe shaped anthers and glandular hairs on the inflorescence part of the flowering stem.

== Taxonomy ==
In 1940 the Penstemon expert David D. Keck described a new species in the genus, naming it Penstemon nanus. Keck studied the species after Walter P. Cottam sent him a specimen, eventually describing it using plants gathered by Arthur Perry Plummer including the holotype collected on 13 May 1939. Alongside the rest of the genus it is part of the Plantaginaceae family and the species has no synonyms or varieties.

=== Names ===
The species name, nanus, means dwarf in Botanical Latin. It is similarly known as the dwarf penstemon, dwarf beardtongue, or low beardtongue, however Penstemon pumilus, Penstemon caespitosus, and Penstemon humilis are respectively known by identical common names.

== Range and habitat ==
Dwarf penstemon are endemic to the Great Basin, only growing in the western half of Beaver and Millard counties in southwestern Utah; though there are also uncertain reports of the species in Iron County. They are primarily found in and around the dry valleys and hillsides of low ranges such as the Burbank Hills, Confusion Range, Halfway Hills, Mountain Home Range, Tunnel Spring Mountains, and Wah Wah Mountains.

The species grows on soils with dolomite or limestone gravel at elevations of 1,580 to 2,170 meters (5,180–7,120 ft). They can grow in areas of sagebrush scrub, rabbitbrush and grasses, matchweed, or pinyon–juniper woodland.

== See also ==
- List of Penstemon species
