= Penstemon concinnus =

- South of the Tunnel Spring Mountains, Millard County, Utah

Conservation status
- Vulnerable (NatureServe)

Scientific classification
- Kingdom: Plantae
- Clade: Tracheophytes
- Clade: Angiosperms
- Clade: Eudicots
- Clade: Asterids
- Order: Lamiales
- Family: Plantaginaceae
- Genus: Penstemon
- Species: P. concinnus

Binomial name
- Penstemon concinnus D.D.Keck

Plant species in the veronica family

Penstemon concinnus, commonly Tunnel Springs penstemon, is a rare species in the Veronica family that only grows in the desert mountains of western Utah and eastern Nevada in the Great Basin. It is adapted to growing on alkaline soils from rocks such as limestone.

== Description ==
The Tunnel Springs penstemon is a short-lived herbaceous perennial plant that grows from a thick crown atop a taproot. The flowering stems are usually 7 to 18 centimeters (3–7 in) long, but can sometimes reach 24 cm (9.5 in). They grow straight upwards or lean outwards from the base of the plant; each plant has a few to several flowering stems. The stems are often covered all over with purple plant pigments and are always covered in thin backwards pointing hairs.

Most of the leaves are basal, attached directly to the base of the plant, but each stem can have six to ten leaves attached to opposite sides in pairs. The basal leaves and the lowest stem leaves are attached by leaf stems. They are typically 3–5.5 centimeters (1.2–2.2 in) long and just 2–5 mm wide, but can reach 7 cm (2.8 in) in length and 8 mm wide on occasion. The basal leaves are oblanceolate, lanceolate, or narrow and grass-like in shape. The uppermost leaves on the stems are attached by shorter leaf stems or directly by the base of the leaf and measure 1.7–6 cm (0.7–2.4 in) long and 1–5 mm wide. All the leaves can have smooth edges or have faint teeth towards the leaf tip. They are not leathery and can be hairless or just have hairs on the leaf stem or middle vein.

The flowers are violet to lavender or purple and covered externally in glandular hairs and 0.8–1.1 cm long. The fused funnel shaped petals are violet inside with white-hairs on the lower surface and dark violet-purple floral guide lines extending into the throat of the bloom. The staminode with its dense covering of white or pale yellow hairs is 6–8 mm long and extends out of the flower's mouth. The flowers are attached to an inflorescence called a thyrse with three to six groups of flowers, each with two attachment points with two to six flowers.

The fruit is a capsule that is 4–6 mm long and 3–4 mm wide. The capsule is a broad egg shape and contains seeds that are about 2 mm long.

== Taxonomy ==
The Penstemon expert, David D. Keck, published the scientific description of a new species in the genus in 1940, giving it the name Penstemon concinnus. The type specimen was collected by Walter P. Cottam on 28 June 1933 in the northwest corner of the Desert Range Experiment Station, about 16 kilometers (10 mi) east of Garrison, Utah. Alongside the rest of the genus it is classified in the Plantaginaceae family. The species has no varieties or botanical synonyms.

=== Names ===
Penstemon concinnus is known by the common names Tunnel Springs penstemon and Tunnel Springs beardtongue. It is also known as the elegant penstemon, but this name is used for other species including Penstemon venustus and Penstemon elegantulus.

== Range and habitat ==
Tunnel Springs penstemons are endemic to the calcareous mountains of the Great Basin. They grow in western central Utah and eastern Nevada. In Utah they are found in the Burbank Hills, Needle, Tunnel Spring, and Wah Wah mountains and the Snake Range in Nevada. According to the Flora of North America they are reliably reported from four counties, Lincoln and White Pine in Nevada and Beaver and Millard counties in Utah, however the USDA Natural Resources Conservation Service plant database also places the species in Iron and Washington counties in southwestern Utah. The size of its range is estimated at 3,200 square kilometers (1,200 sq mi).

The plants grow on gravelly soils from limestone or from calcareous igneous rocks, usually pale in color. They grow at elevations of 1,600–2,200 meters (5,200–7,200 ft) in pinyon–juniper woodlands or desert shrublands.

=== Conservation ===
When reviewed by NatureServe in 2026 they rated the Tunnel Springs penstemon as imperiled at the global level and in both Nevada and Utah (G2, S2).There are an estimated 26 populations of the species, but the total number of plants is unknown. Threats to the spices include grazing, road maintenance, off-road vehicle recreation, the removal of pinyon–juniper woodlands using heavy machinery (mastication), invasive species (specifically Bromus tectorum), and drought.

== See also ==
- List of Penstemon species
