= Fossil Mountain (Utah) =

Mountain in the state of Utah

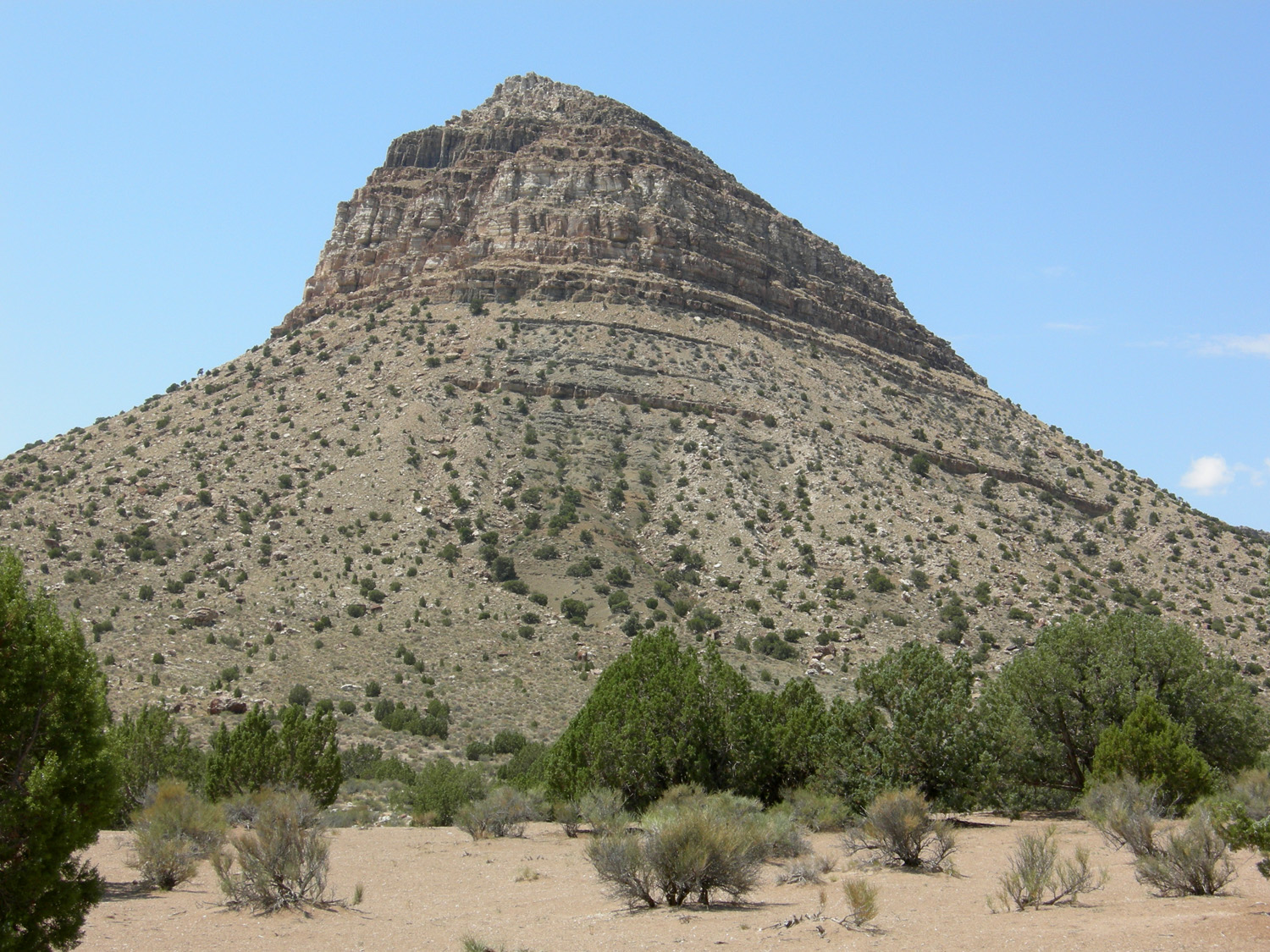
- Early to middle Ordovician sedimentary strata exposed at Fossil Mountain, west-central Utah

Highest point
- Elevation: 6,649 ft (2,027 m)
- Listing: Mountains of Utah
- Coordinates: 38°52′33″N 113°28′10″W

Geography
- Location within Utah
- Location: Millard County, Utah, U.S.
- Parent range: Confusion Range
- Topo map: USGS The Barn 7.5 Minute Series

Fossil Mountain is a peak in the south end of the Confusion Range in Millard County, Utah. It is a well-known and popular location with rockhounds and fossil hunters because of the variety and abundance of Ordovician fossils found on it. Fossil Mountain has also been the site of paleontological research. Sedimentary strata of the Ely Springs Dolomite, Eureka Quartzite, Crystal Peak Dolomite, Watson Ranch Quartzite, and the highly fossiliferous upper Pogonip Group are exposed on it slopes and by its cliffs.

== History ==
Frank Beckwith was the first person to appreciate and publicize the abundant Ordovician fossils at Fossil Mountain along with the abundant Cambrian fossils around Antelope Springs. Around 1910, he started as a cashier at the first bank in the newly founded town of Delta. From Delta, Utah, he and his friend, Charles Kelly, roamed the deserts of Utah and collected fossils and Native American artifacts. It was during this time that they recognized the abundance of well-preserved fossils at Fossil Mountain and around Antelope Springs. Beckwith named Fossil Mountain because of the abundance of marine invertebrate fossils found on its slopes. Both Beckwith and Kelly promoted Fossil Mountain and Antelope Springs to rockhounds and fossil collectors to encourage to visit and spend time in Millard County, Utah.

Later, as editor of the weekly newspaper in Delta, Beckwith encouraged professional paleontologists to study the Cambrian trilobites found around Antelope Springs and Ordovician fossils found at Fossil Mountain. As a result, in the 1930s, the University of Utah geology department conducted regular student field trips to collect Ordovician fossils. Also, Charles E. Resser, Curator of Paleontology, U.S. National Museum, visited Fossil Mountain in 1930, to conduct paleontological research. Beckwith also sent to the U.S. National Museum several collections of Ordovician fossils, including trilobites, brachiopods, ostracods, gastropods, and cephalopods, from Fossil Mountain. Of these fossils, Ulrich and Cooper (1938) formally described the Ordovician brachiopods.

In the late 1940s and early 1950s, Hintze made extensive collections of fossils from and described the stratigraphy of lower Paleozoic strata exposed at Fossil Mountain and the surrounding Confusion Range. The fossils included various genera of trilobites, brachiopods, ostracods, and gastropods, nautiloids, cystoids, and a receptaculitid. Hintze also designated the east slope of Fossil Mountain as the type section for the Kanosh Shale.

== Geology ==
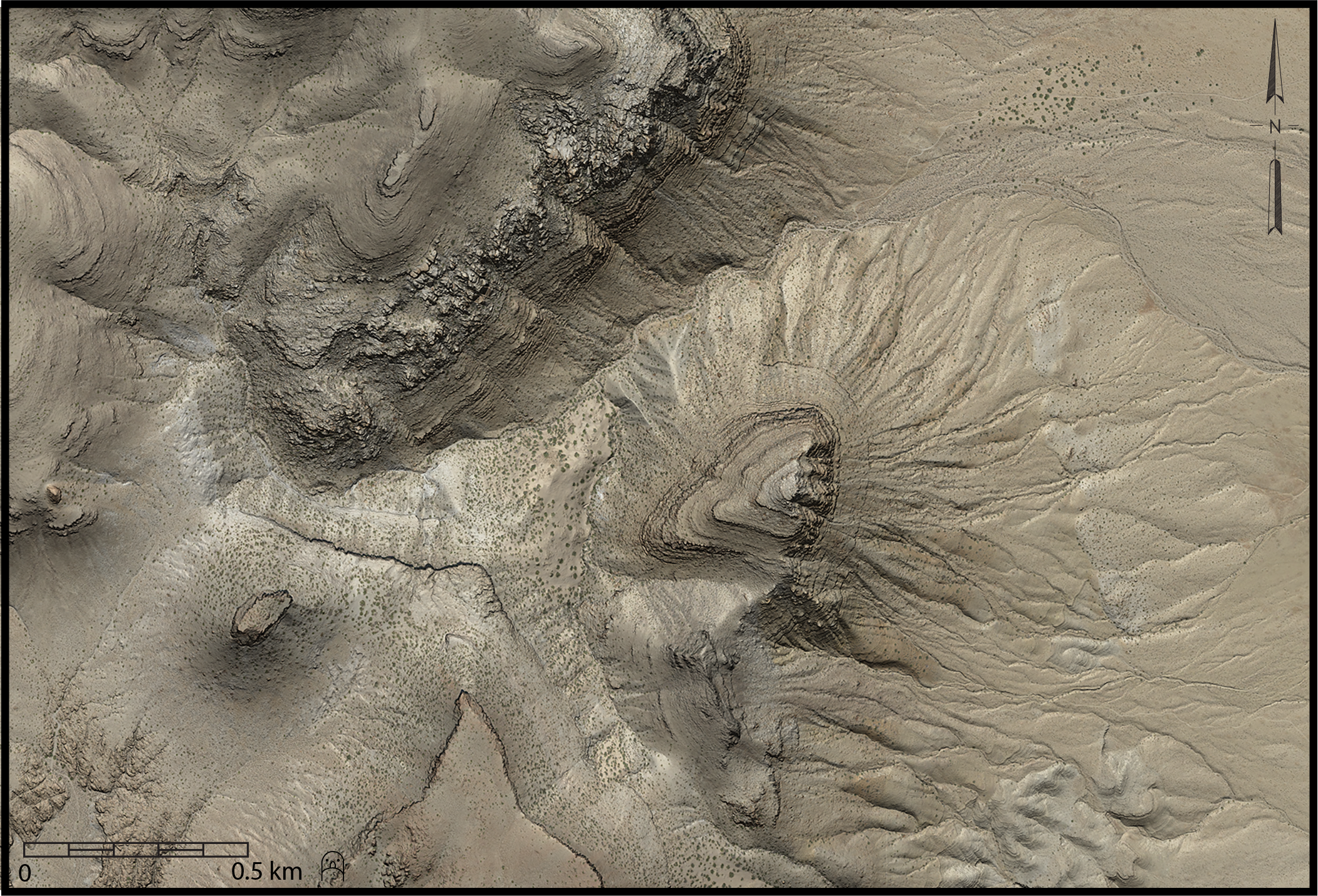
Shaded relief map with aerial base of Fossil Mountain, Utah

The cliffs and slopes of Fossil Mountain expose a neatly layered set of shallow marine, early to middle Ordovician limestones, dolomites, shales, siltstones, sandstones and quartzites. At the base of Fossil Mountain, the limestones, calcium-rich siltstones, sandstones, conglomerates, and shales of the upper Pogonip Group outcrop. At this location, the Pogonip Group is subdivided, from oldest to youngest, into the Wah Wah Limestone, Juab Limestone, Kanosh Shale, and Lehman Formation. The Wah Wah Limestone is poorly exposed as it is largely covered by the accumulation of colluvium and rock debris at the base of Fossil Mountain. The formations of the upper Pogonip Group accumulated on a shallow marine shelf during the early and middle Ordovician Period (about 485 to 458 million years ago). Overlying the upper Pogonip Group, from oldest to youngest, are the Watson Ranch Quartzite, Crystal Peak Dolomite, and Eureka Quartzite. The summit of Fossil Mountain consists of Eureka Quartzite. They consist of an interbedded quartzite, limestone, and dolomite. The quartzites represent periods of geologic time during which influxes of quartz-rich sands from the northeast overwhelmed the accumulation of invertebrate remains and lime mud within shallow marine shelf and coastal environments.

== Fossils ==
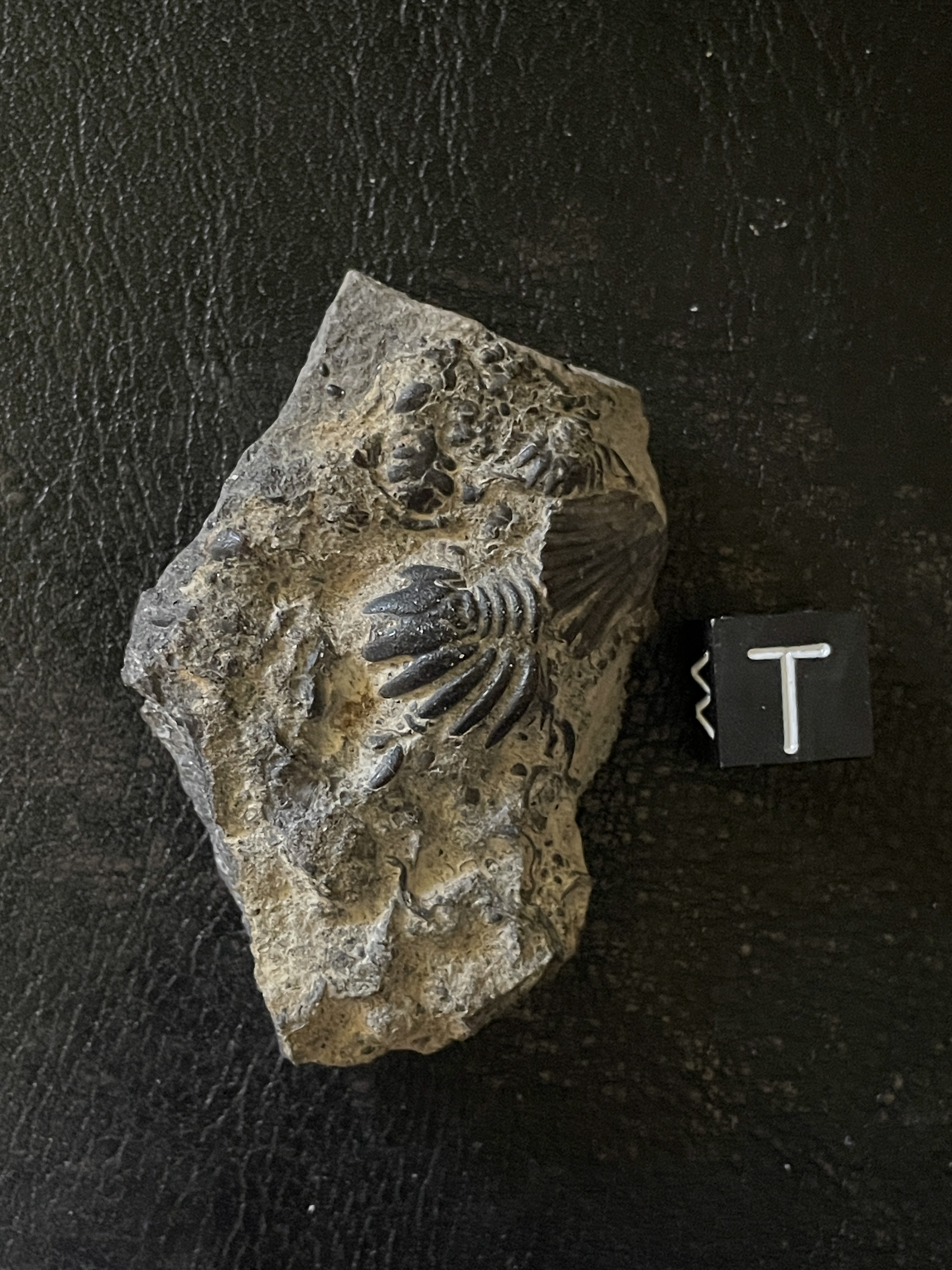
Pygidium and glabella of Hintzeia aemula from Pogonip Group, east face of Fossil Mountain, Millard County, Utah. Black cube is a one centimeter square.

At Fossil Mountain, upper Pogonip Group is highly fossiliferous. The outcrops of it at this location contain a highly diverse assemblage of trilobites, graptolites, conodonts, brachiopods, echinoderms, ostracods, gastropods, cephalopods, pelecypods, sponges, bryozoans, corals, cyanobacteria, and trace fossils. This diversity of invertebrate fossils found at this location reflects the biodiversification of invertebrates at the family, genus, and species levels during the Great Ordovician Biodiversification Event. The fossils at Fossil Mountain are commonly fragmentary because they accumulated in a high-energy, wave-dominated shoreline and shallow marine environments. Typically, they are cemented together into thin beds of fossil hash. The most common fossils found on the slopes of Fossil Mountain are brachiopods, gastropods, crinoids, cephalopods, and trilobites.

As part of the King Top Wilderness Area, only surface collecting is allowed, and digging is prohibited by the U.S. Bureau of Land Management Fillmore Field Office. In addition, they allow only the collection of rocks and fossils in reasonable amounts for personal use only. Collection of fossils and rocks with intent to sell is prohibited.
