= Pine Valley (Beaver, Millard, Iron counties, Utah) =

Valley in Millard, Beaver, and Iron counties in Utah, United States

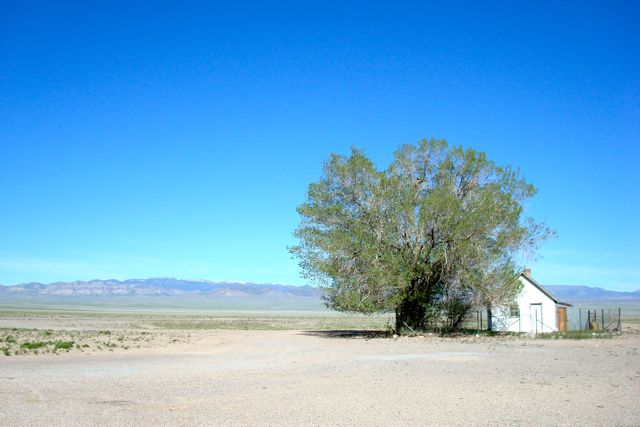
- North Pine Valley and the Wah Wah Mountains, May 2010

- Location within Utah
- Length: 50 mi (80 km) N-S
- Width: 13 mi (21 km)

Geography
- Country: United States
- State: Utah
- Region: Great Basin Desert
- Counties: Beaver; Millard; Iron
- Communities: Five Points
- Borders on: List: Antelope Valley; Tunnel Springs Mountains; Ferguson Desert; Confusion Range; Wah Wah Mountains; Indian Peak Range; Mountain Home Range
- Coordinates: 38°25′03″N 113°41′14″W
- River: Pine Valley Wash
- Interactive map of Pine Valley

Pine Valley is a 50-mile (80 km) long valley in southwestern Utah, United States. Most of the valley lies in western Beaver and Millard counties; the extreme south of the valley arises in two mountain range regions in northwestern Iron County.

The valley is endorheic, with a north-flowing Pine Valley Wash that ends in sinks. At about seven miles north of the sinks region, in a north valley area, lies the Pine Valley Hardpan, about 4 miles (6.4 km) long, east-west.

The northwest of Pine Valley contains a 12-mile (19 km) long Desert Biosphere Reserve and Experimental Station. The southern stretch of the Tunnel Springs Mountains is in the experimental station.

== Description ==
Pine Valley is about a 50-mile (80 km) long valley. The valley narrows in the south to about 3 miles (4.8 km) wide, where Pine Valley Wash originates. The valley is a north-south valley, but the southern 10 miles (16 km) turns southeasterly, paralleling a mountain ridgeline stretch of the Indian Springs Range bordered to the west. The south terminus of Pine Valley is at the merge point of the southeast Indian Springs and Wah Wah Mountains. Steamboat Mountain, 8,588 feet (2,618 m), is west, south of the Indian Springs, but a northeasterly stretch of peaks, ridges, and hills form the southern border of the two ranges. The northeast mountainous stretch is also a part of the northwest border of the Escalante Desert, which lies below at lower elevations.

The north terminus of Pine Valley also narrows; here, the Tunnel Springs Mountains are the west border, and a lower stretch of mountains and hills trend northwest from the north Wah Wah Mountains to form the eastern border.

The center of Pine Valley has a 7-mile (11 km) long alluvial fan that trends northeasterly off the center and southeast flank of the Mountain Home Range. The center of the valley has CCC Reservoir (south, about the north-south valley center); the center-north contains Cow Camp Well and Electric Fence Reservoir. Cow Camp and Electric Fence are in the sinks region at the north terminus of Pine Valley Wash. Adjacent just north are the Pine Valley Hardpan, which has washes feeding it from the northwest (Tunnel Springs Mtns), and northeast; and from the alluvial fan washes southwest, Pine Valley Wash, south, and other washes from the east and southeast (Wah Wah Mtns).

The low point of the valley is probably Pine Valley Hardpan or the Pine Valley Wash sinks.

== Access ==
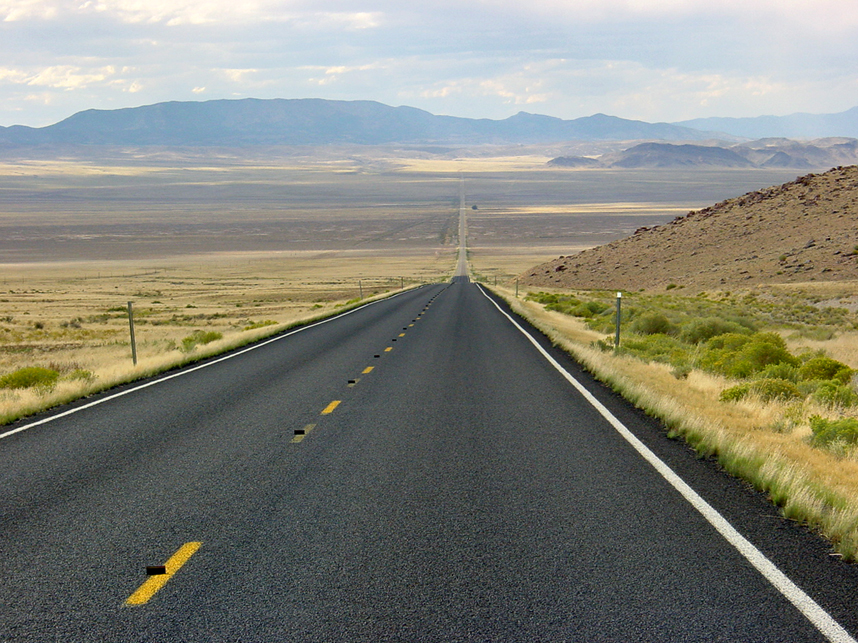
Looking northwest along Utah State Route 21 across the Pine Valley, September 2001

The paved highway, Pine Valley Road, traverses from the south Pine Valley terminus to its north center, east of Five Points. The highway starts at Lund at the south of the Wah Wah Mountains, and in the Escalante Desert. The paved route section ends at the north at its intersection with Utah State Route 21 (SR‑21). A local road section of Pine Valley Road transits north from SR‑21, a due-north, straight stretch that borders the east of the Desert Biosphere Reserve and Experimental Station, traverses the west of north Pine Valley, adjacent to its terminus, and also crosses the east flank of the small Tunnel Springs Mountains. The road terminates further north at the east-west stretch of U.S. Route 6U.S. Route 50. Pine Valley Road also dissects the Pine Valley Hardpan; the west section of the hardpan is in the Desert Range Experimental Station.

State Route 21 northwest, from Garrison crosses the central-north section of Pine Valley; the route transits east to Milford, about 40 miles (64 km) distant.

Numerous unimproved roads access surrounding mountain foothills and many mountain canyons or washes.

== See also ==
- List of valleys of Utah
