= Crystal Peak Dolomite =

Geologic formation in Utah, United States

- Stratigraphic range: Middle Ordovician (Whiterockian); ~471–458 Ma
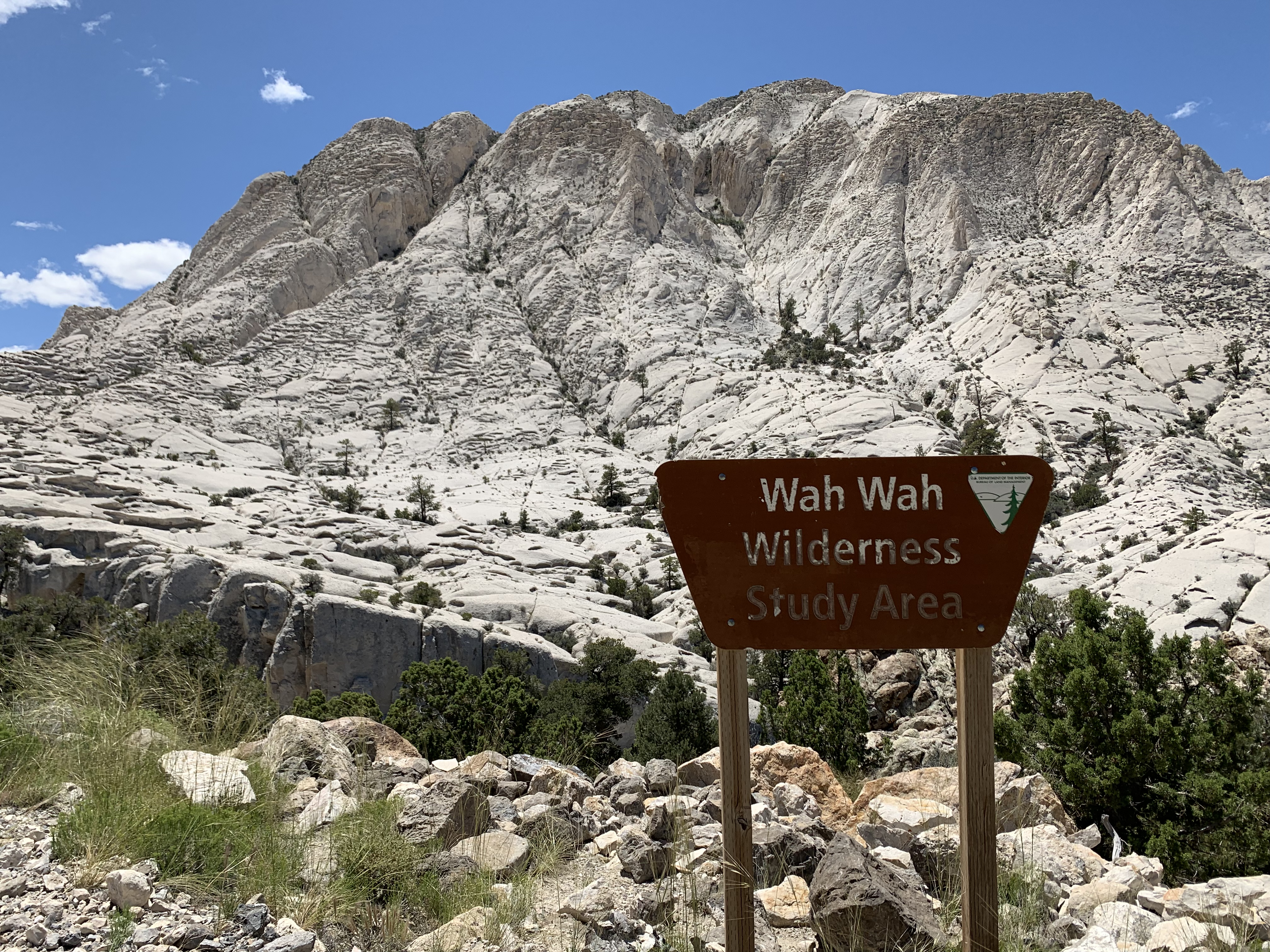
- Type: Formation
- Underlies: Eureka Quartzite
- Overlies: Watson Ranch Quartzite
- Thickness: up to 92 ft (28 m)

Lithology
- Primary: dolomite
- Other: Limestone

Location
- Coordinates: 38.8°N 113.6°W
- Approximate paleocoordinates: 8.1°S 79.8°W
- Region: Utah
- Country: United States
- Extent: Wah Wah Mountains

Type section
- Named for: Crystal Peak section
- Crystal Peak Dolomite (the United States) Crystal Peak Dolomite (Utah)

The Crystal Peak Dolomite is a geologic formation in the Wah Wah Mountains of western Utah. It preserves fossils dating to the Middle Ordovician period.

== Background ==
This geographic stratum is named for its dolomite (used to describe a sedimentary carbonate rock composed predominantly of the mineral dolomite). It is named for exposures at the Crystal Peak section 10 miles (16 km) southwest of Smooth Canyon, Millard County, Utah in the Great Basin province. It separates the Watson Ranch Quartzite tongue of Swan Peak Quartzite from the younger Eureka Quartzite. The stratum generally consists of brown, gray to black, usually fine- to medium-grained, but may be coarse-grained, dolomite. Thin [about 6 feet (1.8 m) thick] quartz sandstone and siltstone occur about 50 feet (15 m) from base. The layer is 85 feet (26 m) thick in Smooth Canyon. The stratum is fossiliferous and it has been shown to contain orthocone cephalopods and corals identified as Eofletcheria sp.. The thickness has been measured between 61 feet (19 m) thick in Tule Valley, Utah to 92 feet (28 m) thick in Desert Range Experiment Station, Utah; it is 89 feet (27 m) thick at Crystal Peak. It is classified as Middle Ordovician age. The Crystal Peak equivalent has been recognized in the Lehman Formation in the Snake Range of Nevada, but was not specifically identified in adjoining eastern Nevada.

== See also ==
- List of fossiliferous stratigraphic units in Utah
- Paleontology in Utah

== Bibliography ==
- L.F. Hintze. 1951. Lower Ordovician detailed stratigraphic sections for western Utah. Utah Geological and Mineralogical Survey Bulletin 39:99
