= Plateau Valley =

Plateau Valley may refer to:

- Plateau Valley (Colorado)
- Plateau Valley (Utah)
