= List of valleys of Utah =

This is a list of valleys of Utah. Valleys are ordered alphabetically by county and then for the entire state.

== Beaver County ==
- Beaver Valley (Utah)
- Hamlin Valley
- Milford Valley
- Pine Valley (Beaver, Millard, Iron counties, Utah) (in Beaver, north Iron, and south Millard counties)
- Wah Wah Valley

== Box Elder County ==
- Bear River Valley
- Blue Creek Valley
- Curlew Valley
- Junction Valley
- Upper Raft River Valley

== Cache County ==
- Ant Valley
- Cache Valley

== Carbon County ==
- Castle Valley (Carbon, Emery, and Sevier counties, Utah)
- Emma Park
- Whitmore Park

== Daggett County ==
- Lucerne Valley

== Davis County ==
- Salt Lake Valley

== Duchesne County ==
- Pleasant Valley
- Roosevelt Valley

== Emery County ==
- Antelope Valley (Wayne-Emery counties, Utah)
- Castle Valley (Carbon, Emery, and Sevier counties, Utah)
- Gunnison Valley (Emery and Grand counties, Utah)
- Joe's Valley
- San Rafael Valley

== Garfield County ==
- Bear Valley Junction, Utah
- Circle Valley'
- Johns Valley
- Mammoth Valley
- Upper Valley

== Grand County ==
- Castle Valley (Grand County, Utah)
- Gunnison Valley (Emery and Grand counties, Utah)
- Grand Valley (Colorado-Utah)
- Salt Valley

== Iron County ==
- Castle Valley (Iron County, Utah)
- Cedar Valley (Iron County, Utah)
- Lower Bear Valley
- Parowan Valley
- Pine Valley (Beaver, Millard, Iron counties, Utah) (in Beaver, north Iron, and south Millard counties)
- Upper Bear Valley

== Juab County ==
- Deep Creek Valley
- Dugway Valley
- Fish Springs Flat
- Johnson Canyon (Juab County, Utah)
- Juab Valley
- Little Valley (Utah)
- Snake Valley (Great Basin)

== Kane County ==
- Kimball Valley
- Long Valley (Kane County, Utah)
- Long Valley Junction, Utah
- Mammoth Valley
- Navajo Valley-(at northeast Lake Powell)

== Millard County ==
- Antelope Valley (southeast Millard County, Utah)
- Antelope Valley (southwest Millard County, Utah)
- Ferguson Desert
- Pahvant Valley
- Pine Valley (Beaver, Millard, Iron counties, Utah) (in Beaver, north Iron, and south Millard counties)
- Round Valley (Millard County, Utah)
- Scipio Valley
- Snake Valley (Great Basin)
- Tule Valley
- Wah Wah Valley
- Whirlwind Valley

== Piute County ==
- Circle Valley
- Grass Valley (Piute and Sevier counties, Utah)

== Salt Lake County ==
- Salt Lake Valley

== San Juan County ==
- Dry Valley (San Juan Valley)
- Lisbon Valley
- Monument Valley
- Spanish Valley, Utah
- Valley of the Gods

== Sanpete County ==
- Antelope Valley (Sanpete County, Utah)
- Gunnison Valley (Sanpete and Sevier counties, Utah)
- Sanpete Valley

== Sevier County ==
- Castle Valley (Carbon, Emery, and Sevier counties, Utah)
- Central Valley, Utah
- Grass Valley (Piute and Sevier counties, Utah)
- Gunnison Valley (Sanpete and Sevier counties, Utah)
- Plateau Valley (Utah)

== Summit County ==
- Rhodes Valley
- Snyderville Basin, (Round Valley (Utah))

== Tooele County ==
- Deep Creek Valley
- Dugway Valley
- Falcon Valley
- Ripple Valley
- Rush Valley
- Skull Valley (Utah)
- Snake Valley (Great Basin)
- Tooele Valley

== Uintah County ==
- Ashley Valley
- Diamond Valley (Uintah County, Utah), at Diamond Mountain Plateau
- Pleasant Valley
- Roosevelt Valley

== Utah County ==
- Cedar Valley (Utah County, Utah)
- Goshen Valley
- Utah Valley

== Washington County ==
- Diamond Valley (Washington County, Utah)
- Pine Valley (Washington County, Utah)
  - Pine Valley, Utah
- Warner Valley

== Wayne County ==
- Antelope Valley (Wayne and Emery counties, Utah)
- Blue Valley (Wayne County, Utah)
- Blue Valley Benches
- Cathedral Valley
- Dry Valley (Wayne County, Utah)

== Weber County ==
- Ogden Valley

== Alphabetical listing for entire state ==
A

- Ant Valley
- Antelope Valley (southeast Millard County, Utah)
- Antelope Valley (southwest Millard County, Utah)
- Antelope Valley (Sanpete County, Utah)
- Antelope Valley (Wayne and Emery counties, Utah)
- Ashley Valley

B

- Bear River Valley
- Bear Valley Junction, Utah
- Beaver Valley (Utah)
- Blue Creek Valley
- Blue Valley (Wayne County, Utah)
- Blue Valley Benches

C

- Cache Valley
- Castle Valley (Carbon, Emery, and Sevier counties, Utah)
- Castle Valley (Grand County, Utah)
- Castle Valley (Iron County, Utah)
- Cathedral Valley
- Cedar Valley (Iron County, Utah)
- F (Utah County, Utah)
- Central Valley, Utah
- Circle Valley
- Curlew Valley

D

- Deep Creek Valley
- Deer Creek Valley
- Diamond Valley (Uintah County, Utah)
- Diamond Valley (Washington County, Utah)
- Dry Valley (Wayne County, Utah)
- Dry Valley (San Juan Valley)
- Dugway Valley

E

- Emma Park

F

- Falcon Valley
- Ferguson Desert
- Fish Springs Flat

G

- Goshen Valley
- Grand Valley (Colorado-Utah)
- Grass Valley (Piute and Sevier counties, Utah)
- Gunnison Valley (Emery and Grand counties, Utah)
- Gunnison Valley (Sanpete and Sevier counties, Utah)

H

- Hamlin Valley

J

- Joe's Valley
- Johns Valley
- Juab Valley
- Junction Valley

K

- Kimball Valley

L

- Lisbon Valley
- Little Valley (Utah)
- Long Valley (Kane County, Utah)
- Long Valley Junction, Utah
- Lower Bear Valley
  - Upper Bear Valley
- Lucerne Valley

M

- Mammoth Valley
- Milford Valley
- Monument Valley

N

- Navajo Valley-(at northeast Lake Powell)

O

- Ogden Valley

P

- Pavant Valley
- Parowan Valley
- Pine Valley (Beaver, Millard, Iron counties, Utah)
- Pine Valley (Washington County, Utah)
  - Pine Valley, Utah
- Pine Valley (Beaver, Millard, Iron counties, Utah) (in Beaver, north Iron, and south Millard counties)
- Plateau Valley (Utah)
- Pleasant Valley

R

- Rhodes Valley
- Ripple Valley
- Roosevelt Valley
- Snyderville Basin, (Round Valley (Utah))
- Rush Valley

S

- Salt Lake Valley
- Salt Valley
- San Rafael Valley
- Sanpete Valley
- Scipio Valley
- Skull Valley (Utah)
- Snake Valley (Great Basin)
- Spanish Valley, Utah

T

- Tooele Valley
- Tule Valley

U

- Upper Bear Valley
  - Lower Bear Valley
- Upper Raft River Valley
- Upper Valley
- Utah Valley

V

- Valley of the Gods

W

- Wah Wah Valley
- Warner Valley
- Whirlwind Valley
- Whitmore Park

== See also ==
- List of mountain ranges of Utah
- List of plateaus and mesas of Utah
- List of rivers of Utah
