= Salina Creek (Sevier River tributary) =

River in Sanpete and Sevier counties in Utah, United States

Salina Creek is a tributary of the Sevier River, in Utah.

Salina Creek has its source at 39°04′30″N 111°32′14″W at the top of Gunnison Valley at 9960 feet near the top of the west slope of the northern ridge of White Mountain in Sanpete County, Utah.

Its mouth is at its confluence with the Sevier River at an elevation of 5118 feet just west of Salina, Utah, in Sevier County, Utah.

== History ==
From 1830 into the 1850s, the Old Spanish Trail trade route passed westward, entering the Great Basin through the Salina Creek canyon to cross the San Rafael Swell, between the Green River and the Sevier River.

== See also ==
- List of rivers of Utah
