= Limestone Hills =

Hills in Nevada, United States

- Location within Nevada

Highest point
- Elevation: 2,233 m (7,326 ft)
- Coordinates: 38°29.65′N 114°15.27′W

Dimensions
- Length: 17 mi (27 km) NW-SE
- Width: 2.2 mi (3.5 km) E-W

Geography
- Country: United States
- State: Nevada
- District: Lincoln County
- Range coordinates: 38°32′49.834″N 114°16′0.962″W
- Topo map: USGS Wells Summit

The Limestone Hills is a group of hills in the northeast Lincoln County, Nevada. The hills trend northwest-southeast with a length of about 27 km (17 mi) and width of about 3.5 km (2.2 mi). They lie adjacent to the north end of the Wilson Creek–White Rock ranges and the old mining camp of Atlanta. The Nevada–Utah border is 16.5 km (10.3 mi) across Hamlin Valley to the east. The Snake Range and White Pine County lie 12 km (7.5 mi) to the north. The Fortification Range lies to the northwest.
