= Kings Canyon =

Kings Canyon may refer to:

- Kings Canyon (Northern Territory), a canyon within the Watarrka National Park in Australia
- Kings Canyon (Millard County, Utah), a canyon in the Confusion Range of west-central Utah, United States, which the combined U.S. Highway 6/U.S. Highway 50 pass through
- Kings Canyon (Uintah County, Utah), a canyon within the Uintah and Ouray Indian Reservation in southwest Uintah County, Utah, United States
- Kings Canyon National Park, a national park in California, United States, named for Kings Canyon, a canyon within the park
