= Watson Ranch =

Watson Ranch may be:

- Watson Ranch Quartzite, found near Ibex, Utah
- Watson Ranch (Nebraska), near Kearny
- Watson Ranch (California), near American Canyon
