= Dead Mare Wash =

Valley in Utah, United States

Coordinates: 37°40′22″N 111°49′36″W

Dead Mare Wash is a valley in the Dixie National Forest in south-central Garfield County, Utah, United States.

Dead Mare Wash was so named on account of a mare which was found dead there.

== See also ==
- Arroyo (creek)
- List of rivers of Utah
- List of valleys of Utah
