= Alpine penstemon =

Alpine penstemon is a common name for several plants and may refer to:

- Penstemon davidsonii, native to North America
- Penstemon venustus, native to the northwestern United States
- Penstemon glaber, var. alpinus
