= Fossil Mountain =

Fossil Mountain refers to several mountains, including:

- Fossil Mountain (Alberta) in Alberta, Canada
- Fossil Mountain (Alaska) in Alaska, United States
- Fossil Mountain, Arizona in Arizona, United States
- Fossil Mountain (Colorado) in Colorado, United States
- Fossil Mountain (Montana) a mountain in Powell County, Montana, United States
- Fossil Mountain (Utah) in Utah, United States
- Fossil Mountain (Wyoming) in Wyoming, United States
