= Giles, Utah =

- Ghost town
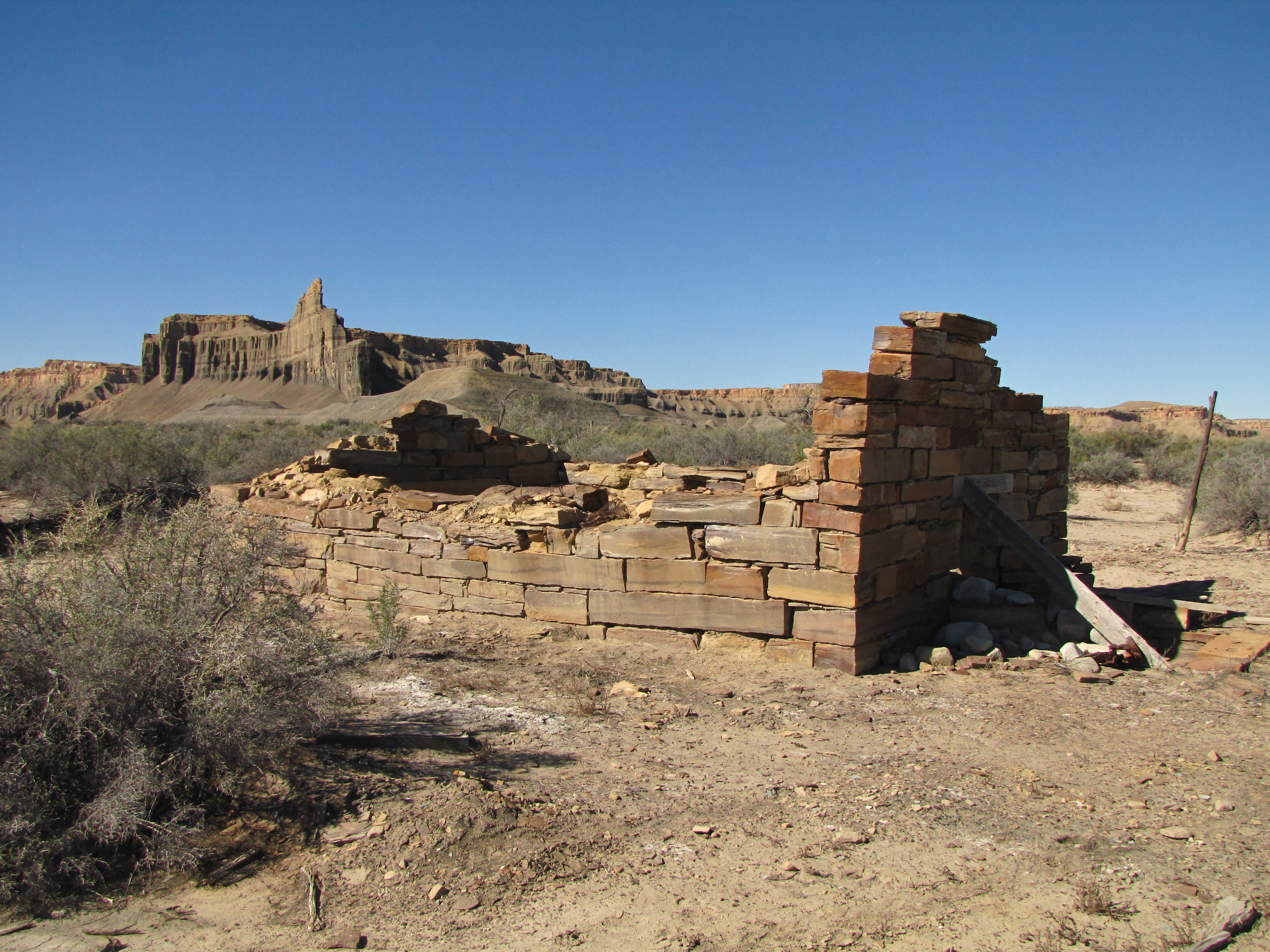

- Location within Utah Location within the United States
- Coordinates: 38°22′10″N 110°50′53″W
- Country: United States
- State: Utah
- County: Wayne
- Established: 1883
- Abandoned: 1919
- Named for: Henry Giles
- Elevation: 4,436 ft (1,352 m)
- GNIS feature ID: 1428188

Giles is a ghost town along the Fremont River in the Blue Valley of Wayne County, Utah, United States. The town was inhabited circa 1883–1919.

== History ==
In the early 1880s, several settlements in Wayne County were started by Mormon farmers under the leadership of Hyrum Burgess. By 1883, some Burgess family members had moved to the Blue Valley area, constructing a dam and irrigation canal by 1884.

The land along the Fremont River was fertile, and the growing season was longer than in western Wayne County. The valley's farming potential soon brought other settlers. The settlement was known as Blue Valley for its blue-gray soil, colored by Bentonite clay and Mancos Shale. The town was built on both riverbanks, but most people lived on the south side. A footbridge connected the two halves. A school building was erected in 1888, but a proper townsite was not laid out until June 1895. At that time, residents renamed their settlement Giles, in honor of the late Bishop Henry Giles, one of Blue Valley's most prominent residents. The crops in Giles grew well, and by 1900 the population had increased to 200. A new meetinghouse went up in 1901, which is said to be the largest in the county. There was a sawmill in the nearby Henry Mountains, and the town included a grocery store, blacksmith shop, and boarding house.

The early 1900s brought frequent devastating floods of the Fremont River. The flooding in 1909–1910 was so severe that local church authorities gave up on trying to maintain a permanent dam. Unable to irrigate their crops, the residents began to leave. By 1919, Giles was a ghost town.

Two rock buildings still stand at the site, and numerous foundations and old corrals show where the town once was.
