= Blue Valley (Wayne County, Utah) =

Valley in Wayne County, Utah, United States

Coordinates: 38°22′N 110°50′W

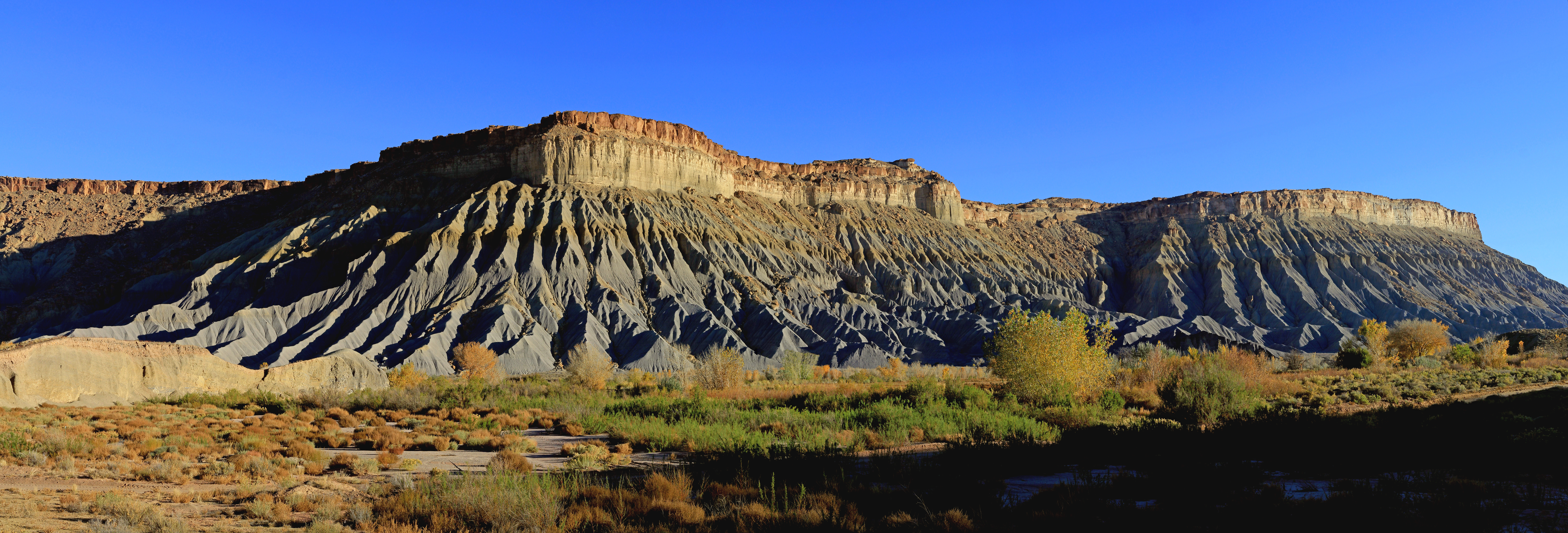

Blue Valley is part of the Fremont River drainage extending from just east of the Caineville Reef to Hanksville, Utah. This stretch of the Fremont River is located approximately 15 miles east of Capitol Reef National Park. It is called Blue Valley because of the blue color of the Mancos Shale that is the dominant geological formation of the Fremont river valley at that elevation. Blue Valley is the location of several ghost towns including Caineville, Giles, and Elephant. First settled by Americans (Mormon pioneers) during the late 1880s as farming and ranching communities, the settlements were all abandoned in 1910 due to flooding of the Fremont River which washed away many farms, destroyed the irrigation systems, and lowered the elevation of the river.

== See also ==
- List of valleys in Utah
