= Gunnison Valley (Sanpete and Sevier counties, Utah) =

Valley in Utah, United States

Gunnison Valley, is a valley that heads in Sanpete County, at 39°03′46″N 111°32′26″W and whose mouth is in Sevier County, Utah, United States.

The headwaters of Salina Creek have their origin here.

== See also ==
- List of valleys of Utah
