= Antelope Valley (southwest Millard County, Utah) =

Valley in southwest Millard County, Utah, United States

- Location within Utah
- Length: 25 mi (40 km)
- Width: 7 mi (11 km)

Geography
- Country: United States
- State: Utah
- Region: Great Basin
- County: Millard
- Population center: Garrison
- Borders on: List: Burbank Hills; Ferguson Desert; Tunnel Springs Mountains; Desert Range Experimental Station; Mountain Home Range
- Coordinates: 38.72412°N 113.92276°W
- Interactive map of Antelope Valley

The Antelope Valley of southwest Millard County, Utah, United States, is a small 25-mile (40 km) long valley, adjacent the Ferguson Desert and 40 miles (64 km) southwest of Sevier Lake. The valley is just east of the Nevada border, with Snake Valley and the Burbank Hills. The other Antelope Valley of Utah occurs 165 miles (266 km) east in the Great Basin, in southeast Emery County and extending into adjacent Wayne County.

The Desert Biosphere Reserve forms the entire southeast, central & south valley border, where the small, low elevation arid Tunnel Springs Mountains are located.

== Description ==
The Antelope Valley is southwest-northeast trending with a drainage northeast into the Ferguson Desert area. The valley also drains from the northeast flank of the Mountain Home Range adjacent the Nevada border to the southwest. The valley is narrow, only about 7 miles (11 km), at its widest.

== Access ==
Utah State Route 21 transects the upper region of the valley at the alluvial fans of the Mountain Home Range. Route 21 crossing the valley is a NNW trending section, coming from Frisco and Milford, Utah to the town site closest to the valley, Garrison, Utah, northwest of Antelope Valley, and on the Utah-Nevada state line.

== See also ==
- List of valleys of Utah
