= Conger Mountain =

Mountain in the American state of Utah

- Location within Utah

Highest point
- Elevation: 8,144 ft (2,482 m)
- Prominence: 1,824 ft (556 m)
- Coordinates: 39°13′46″N 113°43′23″W

Geography
- Location: Millard County, Utah, United States
- Parent range: Confusion Range
- Topo map: USGS Conger Mountain

Conger Mountain is a mountain in Millard County, Utah. It is located 60 miles west of Delta, Utah.

== Wildlife ==
Conger Mountain is almost completely undeveloped. It serves as a habitat for mule deer and antelope and is home to a herd of wild horses. It is considered a vital habitat for the golden eagle and bald eagles have been spotted near the mountain. Conger Mountain is also home to ferruginous hawks, Swainson's hawks, mountain bluebird, red-tailed hawks, prairie falcons, kit foxes, badgers, and chukar.

== Protection status ==
Currently, the 20,400 acres encompassing Conger Mountain are considered a Wilderness Study Area. Action may be taken in the future to designate this area as a Wilderness Area.
