= Kings Canyon (Millard County, Utah) =

Coordinates: 39°05′10″N 113°33′35″W

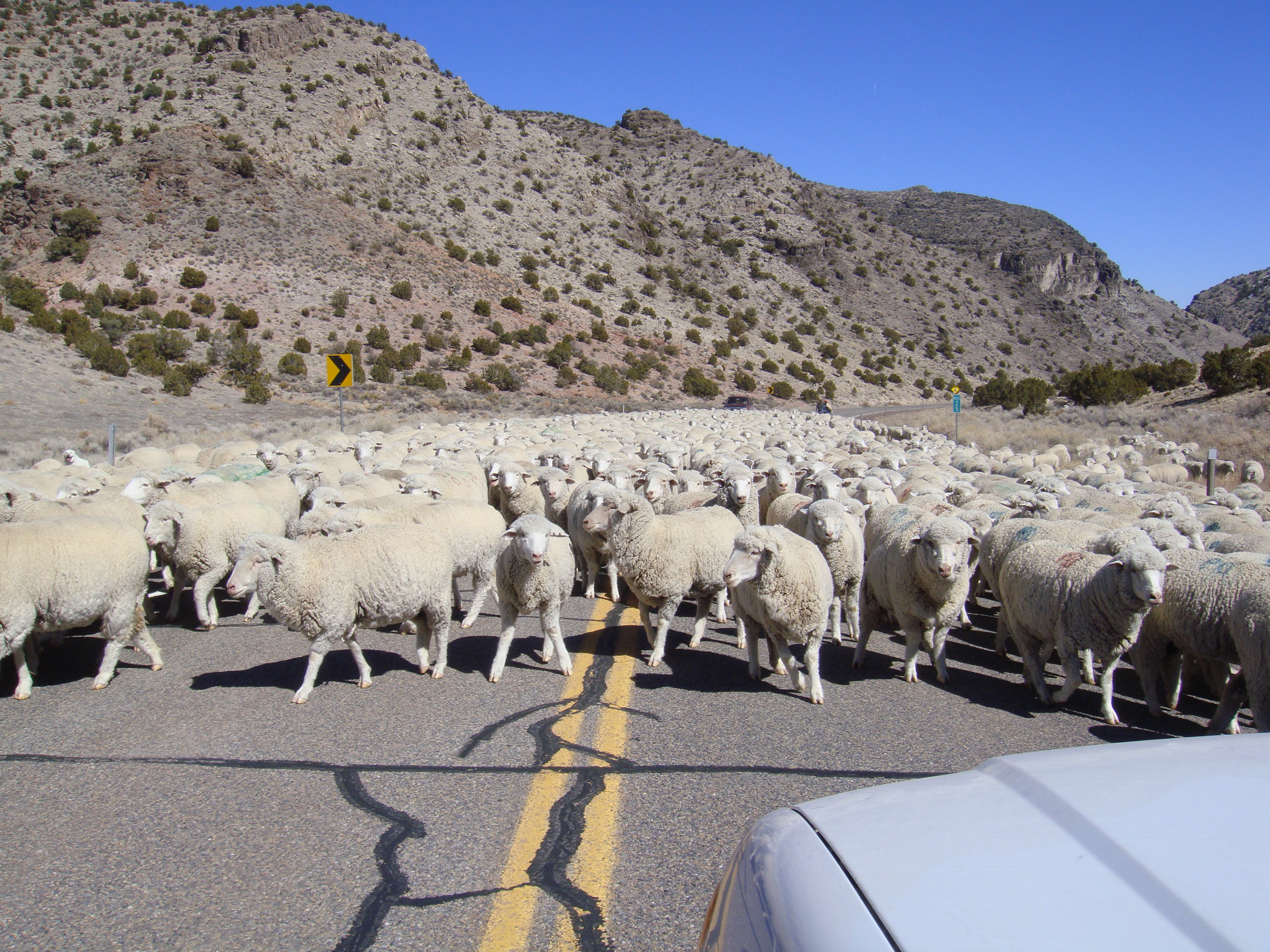
Sheep herded along the road through the canyon, March 2009

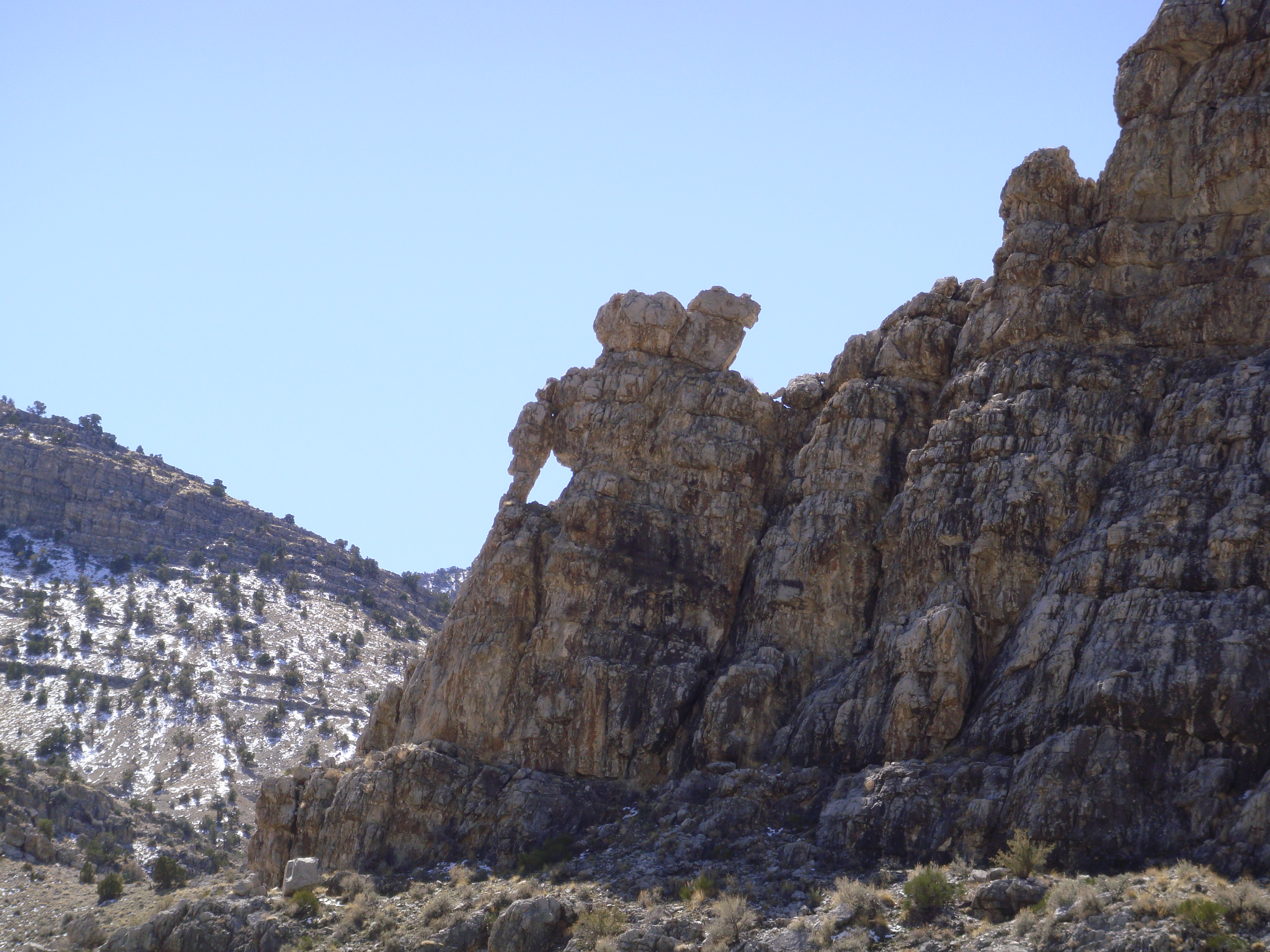
Elephant Rock, March 2009

Kings Canyon is a canyon within the Confusion Range in Millard County, Utah, United States. US Highway 6/US Highway 50 runs through the windy canyon. The area in and around the canyon is unpopulated, and is only used by humans for transportation and some sheep herding.

The strongly bedded rocks that line the canyon are chiefly Silurian to Devonian carbonate rocks, though pink Tertiary ignimbrites can also be seen sporadically in places. A side spur of the canyon, called Cat Canyon, is the location of the most famous tourist attraction in the canyon, Elephant Rock which is in the shape of an elephant carrying a pack or load.

== See also ==
- List of canyons and gorges in Utah
