= White Mountain (Sevier County, Utah) =

Mountain in Utah, United States

White Mountain is a mountain with an elevation of 10,804 feet (3,293 m) NGVD 29 in Sevier County, Utah, United States. A long ridge of it extends northwestward into Sanpete County, at 39°02′12″N 111°31′08″W.
