= Lehman Formation =

Geologic formation in Utah, United States

- Stratigraphic range: Ordovician
- Type: Formation
- Unit of: Pogonip Group
- Underlies: Eureka Quartzite
- Overlies: Kanosh Shale

Lithology
- Primary: Shale, quartzite, limestone

Location
- Region: Great Basin
- Country: United States

Type section
- Named for: Lehman Caves
- Named by: Lehi Hintze
- Year defined: 1951

The Lehman Formation is a geologic formation in Utah. It preserves fossils dating back to the Ordovician period.

== See also ==
- List of fossiliferous stratigraphic units in Utah
- Paleontology in Utah
