= Hamlin Valley =

Valley on both sides of the Nevada–Utah state line

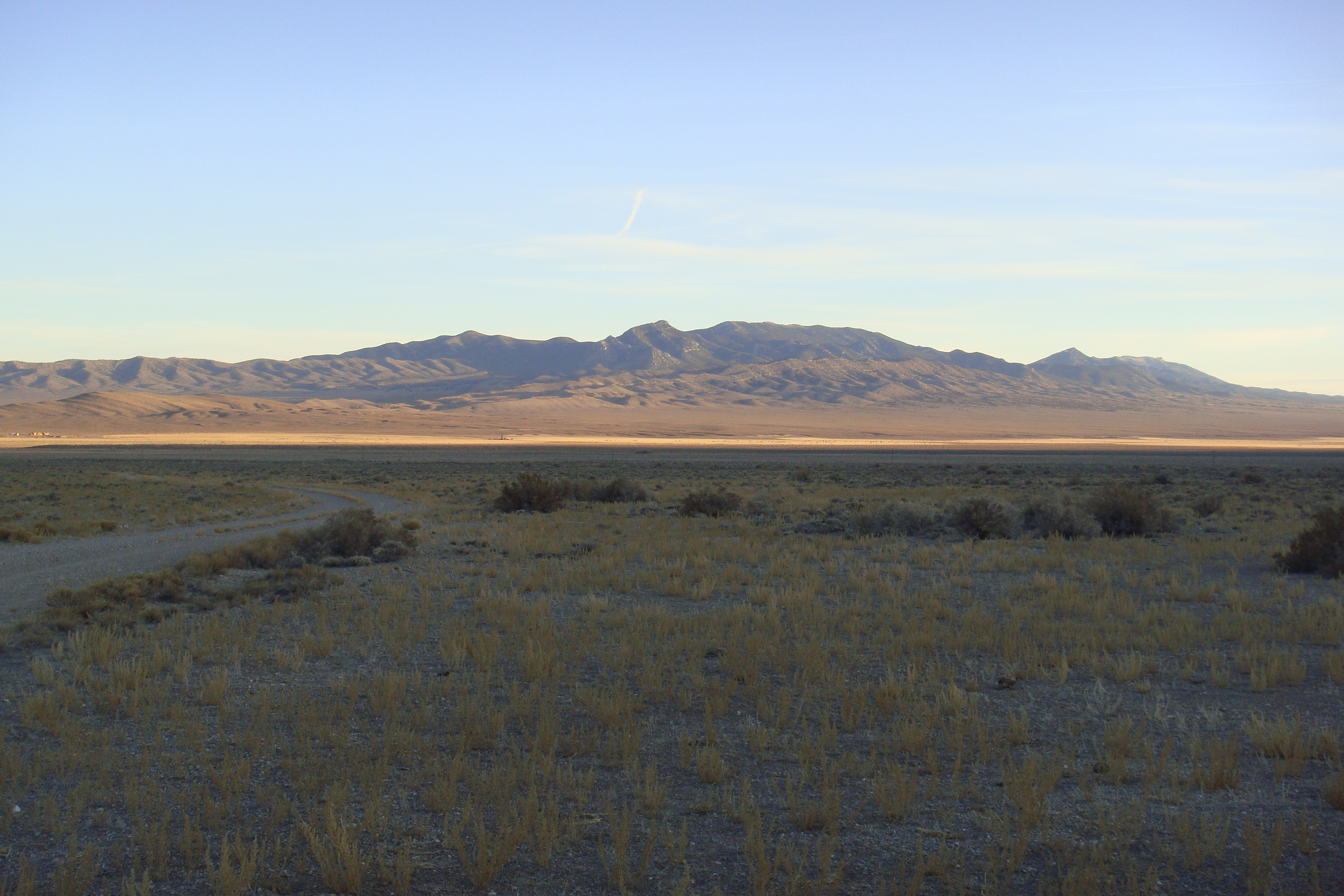
- Valley's northeast, view of northwest Mountain Home Range, (southeasterly view from Snake Range)

- Location within Nevada
- Floor elevation: 6,000 ft (1,800 m)
- Length: 60 mi (97 km)
- Width: 10 mi (16 km)
- Area: 750 sq mi (1,900 km^{2})

Geography
- Location: Utah & Nevada, United States
- Borders on: Mountain Home Range–NE & E Indian Peak Range–E, SE & S Needle Mountains–SSW; White Rock Mountains–SW; Limestone Hills–W; Snake Range-NNW; Snake Valley–NNE
- Coordinates: 38°30′49.82″N 114°10′36.95″W
- Rivers: Hamlin Valley Wash, Big Springs Creek
- Interactive map of Hamlin Valley

Hamlin Valley is a mostly north-south trending valley of the Great Basin located on both sides of the Nevada–Utah state line. It is about 60 miles (97 km) long. Its north-northeast end point adjacent the state line is the southwest start region of the Snake Valley (Great Basin).

== Description ==
Hamlin Valley lies between the Mountain Home Range on the east and Indian Peak Range on the southeast and south, and the Needle Mountains, White Rock Mountains, and Limestone Hills on the west. On the north, it merges with Snake Valley, about 11 miles (18 km) south of Garrison; the south of the Snake Range north-northwest, causes the north valley to narrow and change to northeasterly, as the valley merges into Snake Valley. The north end of the valley is located at 38°45′20″N 114°4′30″W, and the south end at 37°57′33″N 113°56′50″W. Rosencrans Well is located just southwest of the valley's center.

The Hamlin Valley Wash is an ephemeral stream running through the valley, flowing north-northwest, then due north. It originates in the foothills north of Modena, Utah, (in a widening valley origin, southeast, south, and southwest, about 8 mi wide), and drains northwest, following the Hamlin Valley into Nevada. This southeast stretch of the valley trends north-northwesterly, about 25 mi, as do the Indian Peak and White Rock Mountain's central ridgelines, east and west.

The Hamlin Valley Wash disappears near the north end of the valley. Adjacent at the disappearing region 2.5 mi west, Big Springs Creek, originates from Big Springs, at the southeast foothills of the Snake Range, and flows north past Burbank and into the Snake Valley, joins Lake Creek, and empties into Pruess Lake. The Hamlin and Snake valleys together constitute a closed drainage basin.

== Testing incident ==
In 1953, at a sheep camp in Hamlin Valley, Elma Mackelprang observed tiny whitish flakes swirling through the air. They were part of the fallout associated with the Grable experiment, part of the Operation Upshot–Knothole series of nuclear weapon tests, the most reckless and dirtiest ever conducted in Nevada. Mackelprang later experienced symptoms of radiation poisoning.

== See also ==
- List of valleys of Nevada
- List of valleys of Utah
