= White Rock Mountains =

Mountain range in Nevada and Utah, US

- Location within Nevada

Highest point
- Peak: White Rock Peak
- Elevation: 2,786 m (9,140 ft)

Geography
- Country: United States
- State: Nevada
- District: Lincoln County
- Range coordinates: 38°14′55″N 114°6′11″W
- Topo map: USGS White Rock Peak

The White Rock Mountains are a north-northwest trending mountain range located in eastern Lincoln County, Nevada, with the eastern slopes of the range extending into Beaver and Iron counties of Utah. The north end of the range merges with the Wilson Creek Range on the west.

To the east the Hamlin Valley bounds the range with the Indian Peak Range of Utah beyond. To the southeast the range merges with the Paradise Mountains of the Nevada–Utah border area. Spring Valley State Park and the Eagle Reservoir lie in the Spring Valley along the southwest margin of the range. The community of Ursine is about two miles downstream from the Eagle Reservoir.

The Camp Valley separates the main portions of the White Rock and Wilson Creek ranges and continues to the southeast to form the northeast headwaters of Meadow Valley Wash through Spring Valley/Eagle Valley.

The White Rock caldera associated with this range was the site of one of the large-volume volcanic eruptions in the Basin and Range Province.

The range was named from the white color of the rocks which form it.
