= Plateau Valley (Utah) =

Valley in Sevier County, Utah, United States

Plateau Valley (38.568865°N 111.847413°W) is a valley in south-central Sevier County, Utah, United States.

== Description ==
The valley is roughly 15 miles (24 km) southeast of Richfield. It is located immediately north of Grass Valley, and is bounded on the west by Mormon Mountain and on the east by Boobe Hole Mountain. The Koosharem Reservoir is located in the southern part of the valley. Utah State Route 24 runs north-to-south through the valley.

== See also ==
- List of valleys of Utah
