= Desert Biosphere Reserve =

- Desert Experimental Range Station Historic District
- U.S. National Register of Historic Places
- U.S. Historic district
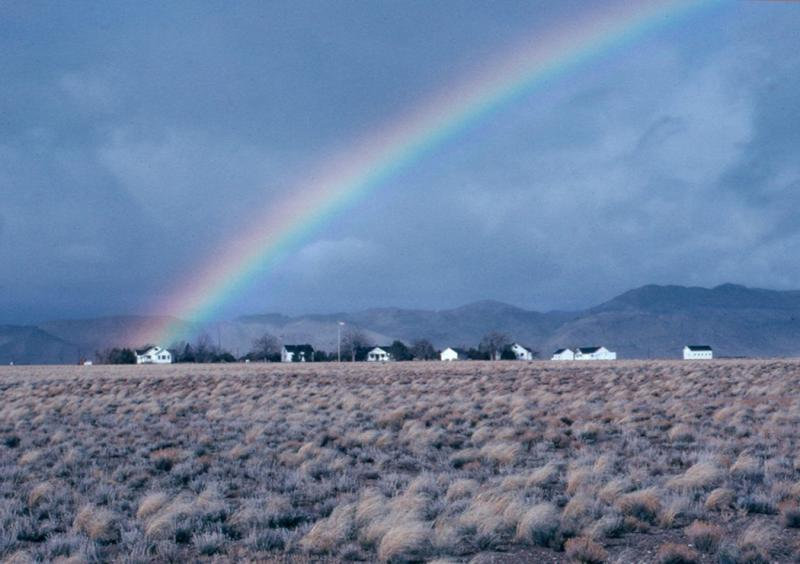
- Desert Biosphere Reserve with rainbow in background, January 2016

- Location within Utah Location within the United States
- Location: Pine Valley; Millar County, Utah; United States
- Nearest city: Milford
- Coordinates: 38°40′N 113°45′W
- Area: 7.5 acres (3.0 ha)
- Built by: United States Forest Service & Civilian Conservation Corps
- Architectural style: Forest Service standard plan
- Website: www.fs.fed.us/rmrs/experimental-forests/desert-experimental-range
- NRHP reference No.: 94000267
- Added to NRHP: April 11, 1994

The Desert Biosphere Reserve and Experimental Range is a biosphere reserve and experimental range in western Millard County, Utah, United States, that is listed as a historic district on the National Register of Historic Places.

== Description ==
The experimental range was established in 1933 when 87 square miles (230 km^{2}) of public lands were designated "as an agricultural range experiment station" by President Herbert Hoover.

The range is maintained by the U.S. Forest Service's Rocky Mountain Research Station. It was declared a biosphere reserve by UNESCO in 1976 but was withdrawn from the program as of June 14, 2017. It is located in the northwest of Pine Valley, a valley section in southwest Millard County, about 40 miles (64 km) west of Milford; the north section of the reserve covers the southern half of the Tunnel Springs Mountains. It protects a landscape typical of the Great Basin, with its typical geography of north–south aligned mountain ranges separated by desert basins. Vegetation is typical of the Great Basin shrub steppe, with shadscale saltbush (Atriplex confertifolia) and sagebrush (Artemisia spp.) scrublands predominant. The reserve also includes areas of Single-leaf Pinyon (Pinus monophylla) juniper woodland and pasture land.

== See also ==
- National Register of Historic Places listings in Millard County, Utah
