= Joe's Valley =

Bouldering area in Utah, United States

Coordinates: 39°16′35″N 111°10′26″W

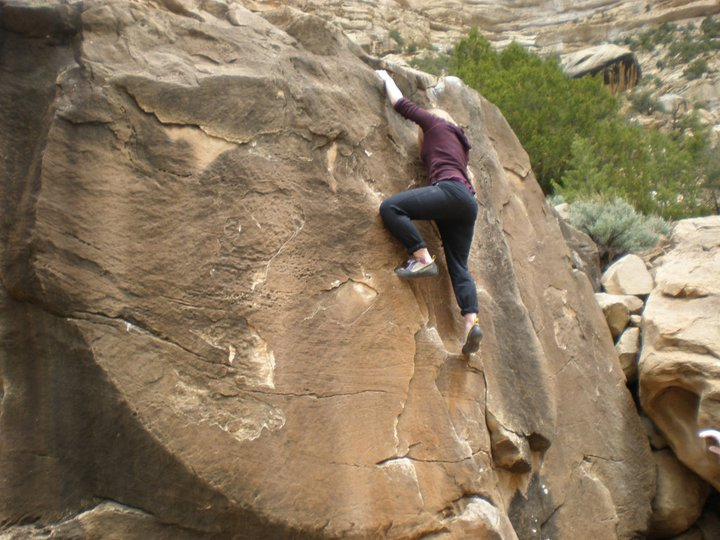
Bouldering at Joe's Valley

Joe's Valley is a large concentration of sandstone boulders east of the Joe's Valley Reservoir near Orangeville, Utah. Joe's is a popular destination for bouldering, divided into three main areas: the Left Fork, the Right Fork, and New Joe's. Climbers have been coming to Joe's Valley since the mid-1990s, and an estimated 15,000 climbers visit Joe's each year.

The climbing is found in three main areas: Left Fork, Right Fork, and New Joe's. Each area has many world class climbs, some of which are listed in the Famous Problems section below.

Joe's Valley Bouldering Fest takes place every fall, drawing competitive climbers from all over the world.

== Famous problems ==
- Black Lung (V13) - Area 51
- Smoking Joe (V9) - Big Joe
- Phony Baloney Traverse (V8) - Area 51
- Planet of the Apes (V7) - New Joe's
- Will A Fire (V6) - Left Fork
- Scary Monster (V6) - Big Joe
- Pocket Rocket (V6) - Area 51
- Kill by Numbers (V5) - Left Fork
- Pimpin Jeans (V3) - New Joe's
- The Angler (V2) - Riverside

== Sources ==
- A Bouldering Guide to Utah, Baldwin, Beck, and Russo.
