= Ferguson Desert =

Valley in Millard County, Utah, United States

Coordinates: 38°58′14″N 113°43′56″W

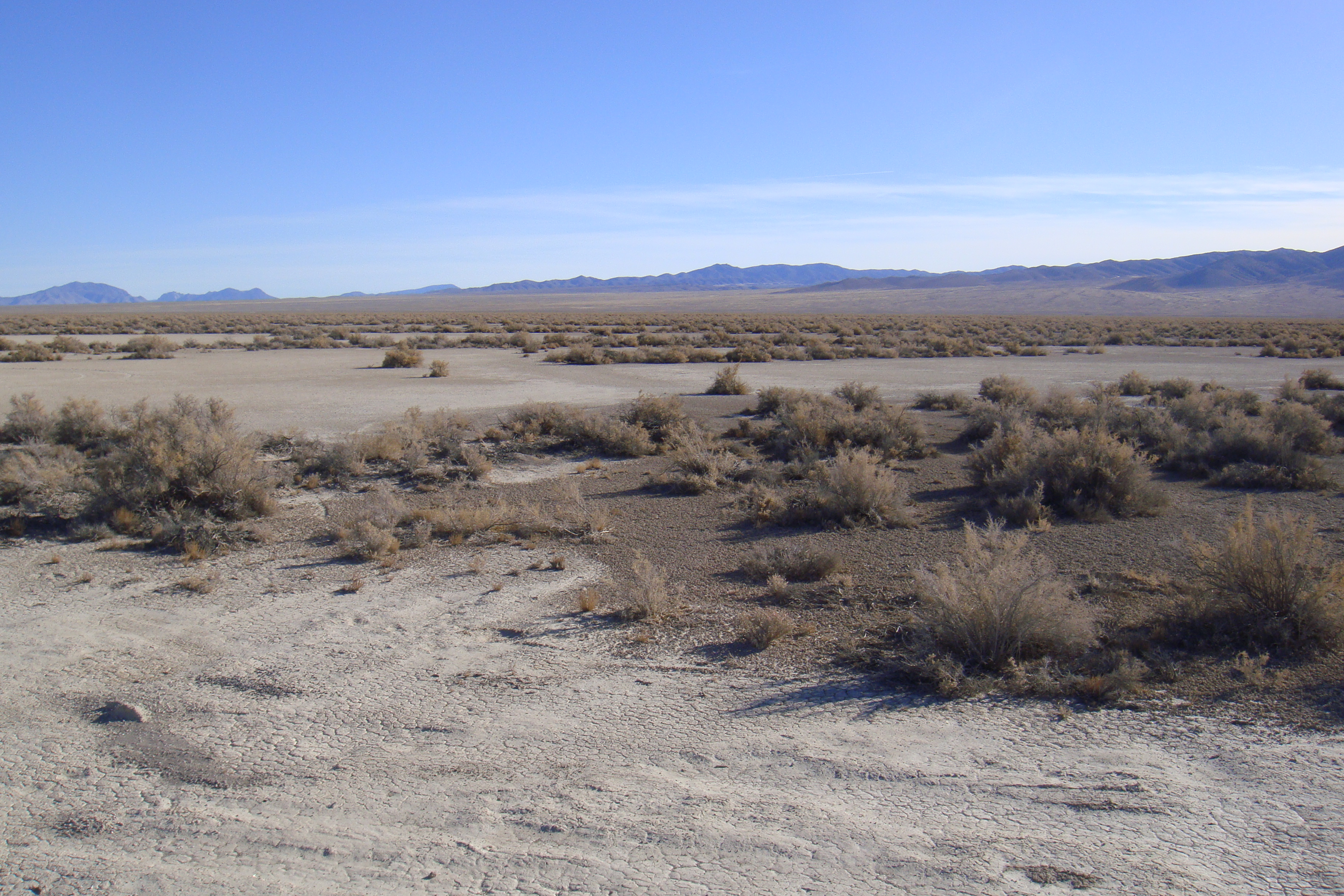
Picture looking down the valley (southeast) from the salt flat

The Ferguson Desert is a small valley in the Hamlin-Snake Watershed of west-central Utah, United States, southeast of the Snake Valley to the northwest, and is bound by the Burbank Hills to the west, the Tunnel Springs Mountains, Pine Valley, and Wah Wah Valley to the south, and the House Range to the north and east; Antelope Valley from the southwest is the southeast border of the Burbank Hills. It is named after James (Jim) Ferguson of Ibapah, Utah. He established a large ranch in the area. The term desert comes from the large hardpan (salt flat) that covers the area.
