= Mountain Home Range =

Mountain range in Utah, United States

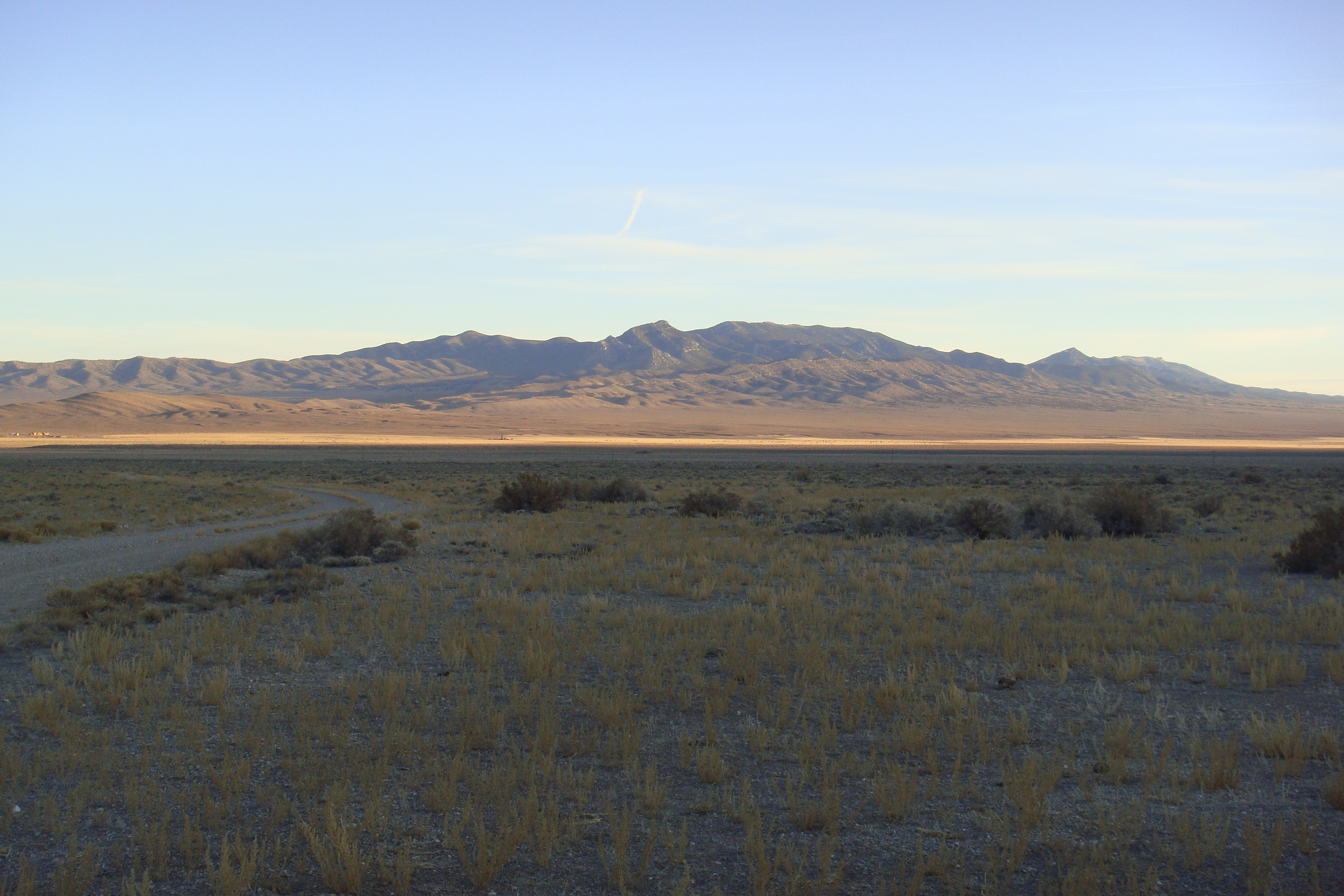
- The range at sunset, from the northwest

Highest point
- Peak: Needle Benchmark
- Elevation: 9,480 ft (2,890 m)
- Coordinates: 38°29′24″N 113°57′29″W

Dimensions
- Length: 25 mi (40 km) N/S
- Width: 23 mi (37 km) E/W
- Area: 424 mi^{2} (1,100 km^{2})

Geography
- Location within Utah
- Country: United States
- State: Utah

The Mountain Home Range is a north-south trending mountain range in western Beaver County in southwest Utah, United States. It is part of the Basin and Range Province. It is bound by Hamlin Valley to the west, Snake Valley (part of this area known as Antelope Valley on some maps) to the north, Pine Valley to the east, and trends into the Indian Peak Range to the south. Collectively, the Mountain Home Range and Indian Peak Range are known as the Needle Mountains due to their jagged nature.

The highest peak in the range, known simply as the 'Needle benchmark,' is 9,480 feet (2,890 m) tall.

The range is very uncommonly used by humans, and is more known for wildlife and wild horses.

== Geology ==
The northern part of the range is made of Paleozoic carbonate rocks which are part of a long structural trend of rocks that go through the Burbank Hills, Conger Range, and Confusion Range. This is highlighted by a massive (30 by 50 mile) syncline. The southern part of the range is made of mid-Tertiary ignimbrites from the Indian Peak Caldera Complex.

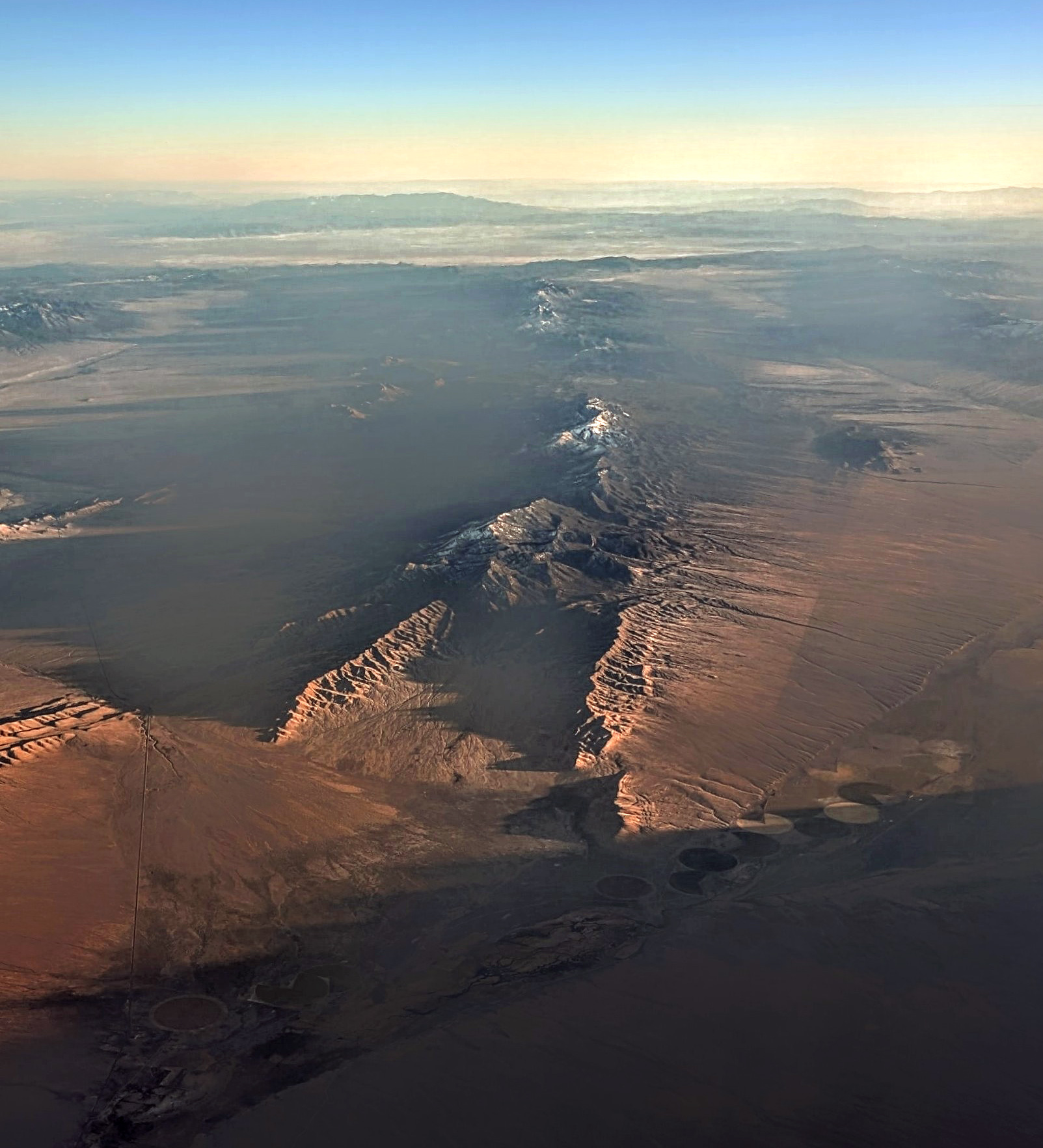
Aerial view from the north of Mountain Home Range near sunset
