= Confusion Range =

Mountain range in Utah, United States

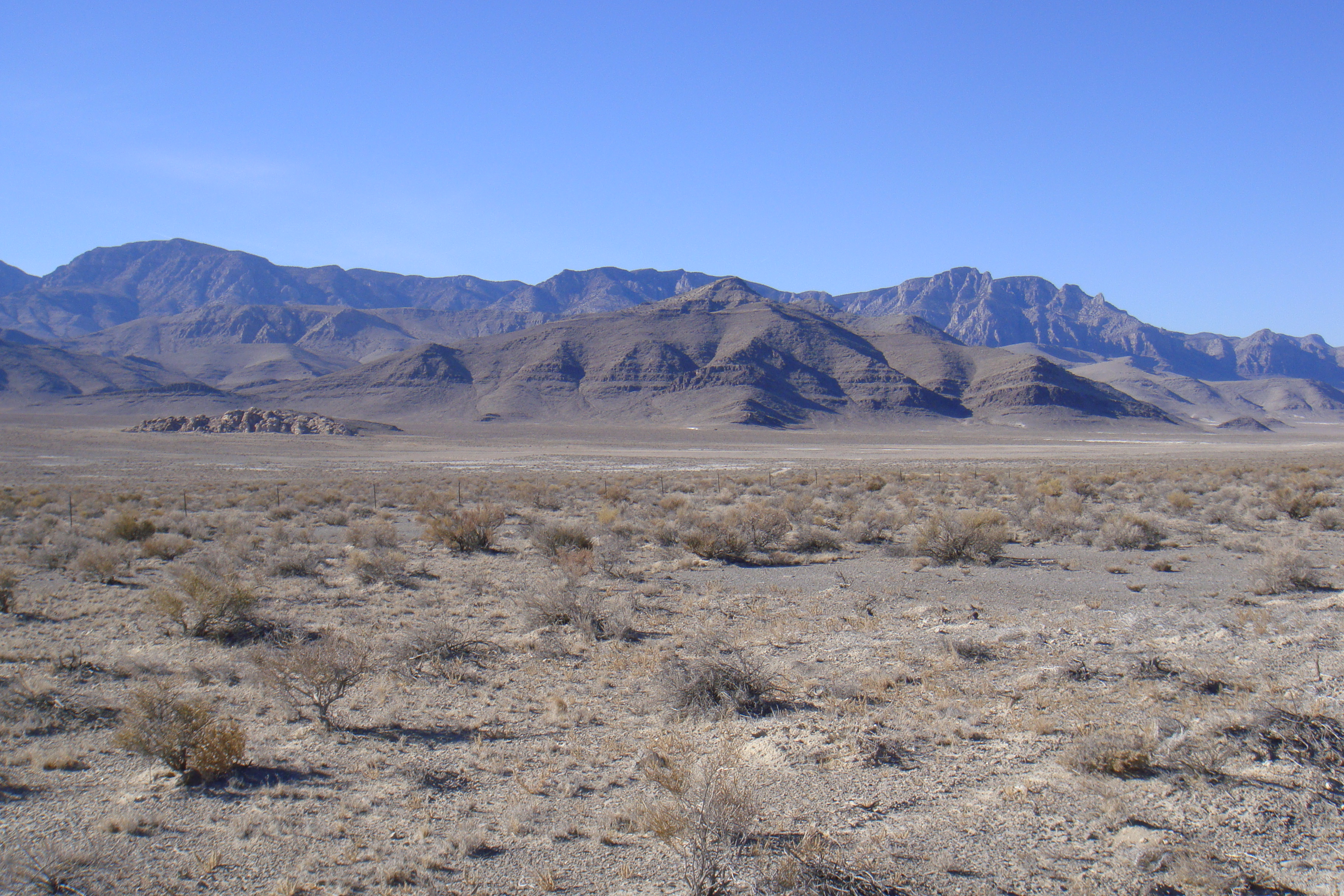
- The Confusion Range from Skull Rock Pass, looking west toward Kings Canyon (Utah)

Highest point
- Peak: King Top
- Elevation: 8,350 ft (2,550 m)
- Coordinates: 38°58′51″N 113°31′50″W

Dimensions
- Length: 78 mi (126 km) N/S
- Width: 31 mi (50 km) E/W
- Area: 1,323 mi^{2} (3,430 km^{2})

Geography
- Location within Utah
- Country: United States
- State: Utah

The Confusion Range is a north-south trending mountain range in west-central Utah, United States. It is bounded by Snake Valley to the west, Tule Valley to the east, the Great Salt Lake Desert to the north, and the Ferguson Desert to the south. The range trends into the Burbank Hills, Mountain Home Range, and the Wah Wah Mountains to the south. In the central part of the range, an offshoot of the mountains to the west is known as the Conger Range. The Confusion Range is named for its "rugged isolation and confusing topography."

The highest peaks in the range are Conger Mountain 39.23328°N 113.700817°W, which is 7,713 feet tall, and King Top 38.910000°N 113.529666°W, which is 8,350 feet tall.

== Geology ==
The geology of the Confusion range is deformed Silurian to Permian limestones, dolomites, and shales.

== Roads ==
There are three main ways to travel through the Confusion Range:

- Around the north end, from Callao, Utah to Sand Pass
- On old Highway 6/50, on a dirt road through Cowboy Pass
- On US Highway 6/US Highway 50, through Kings Canyon (Utah)

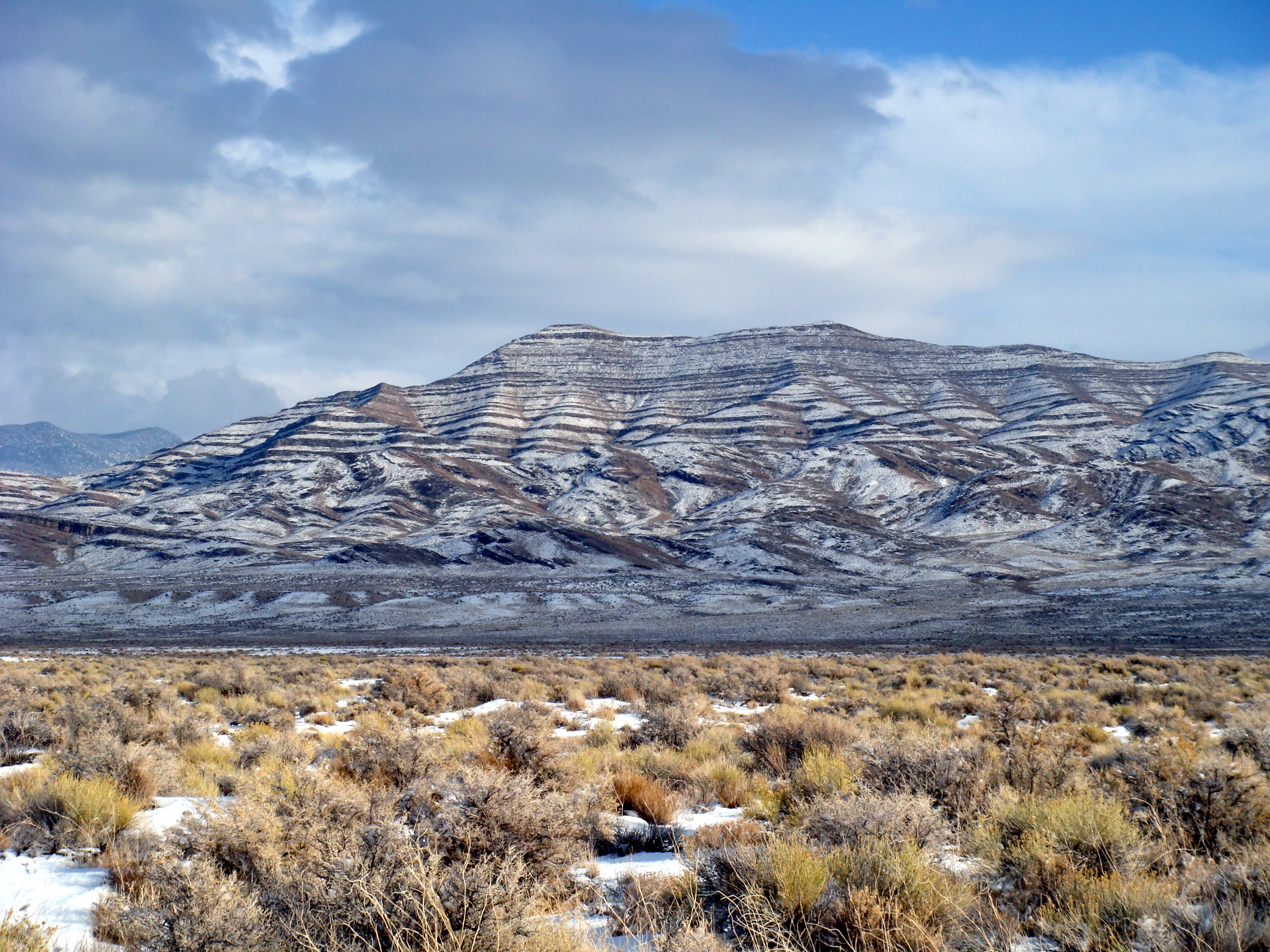
Snow on the hills around Willow Springs Canyon, eastern flank of the range, near Cowboy Pass
