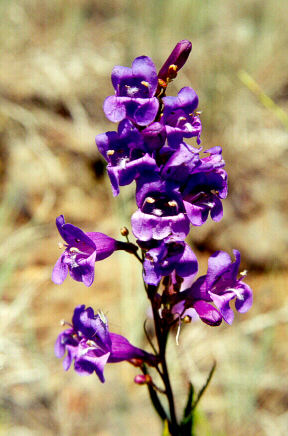

Conservation status
- Apparently Secure (NatureServe)

Scientific classification
- Kingdom: Plantae
- Clade: Tracheophytes
- Clade: Angiosperms
- Clade: Eudicots
- Clade: Asterids
- Order: Lamiales
- Family: Plantaginaceae
- Genus: Penstemon
- Species: P. venustus

Binomial name
- Penstemon venustus Dougl. ex Lindl.

= Penstemon venustus =

Species of flowering plant

Penstemon venustus is a species of penstemon known by the common names Venus penstemon and alpine penstemon. It is native to the northwestern United States, where it grows in many types of open habitat. It is a spreading shrub growing erect to a maximum height near 80 centimeters. The thick, stiff leaves are lance-shaped, serrated, and up to 12 centimeters in length. The showy inflorescence bears many tubular lavender flowers, the largest nearly 4 centimeters long. The mouth of the flower and the staminode are covered in long, white hairs. This penstemon is cultivated for use in wilderness landscaping in its native habitat.
