= Burbank Hills =

Coordinates: 38°49′55″N 113°48′36″W

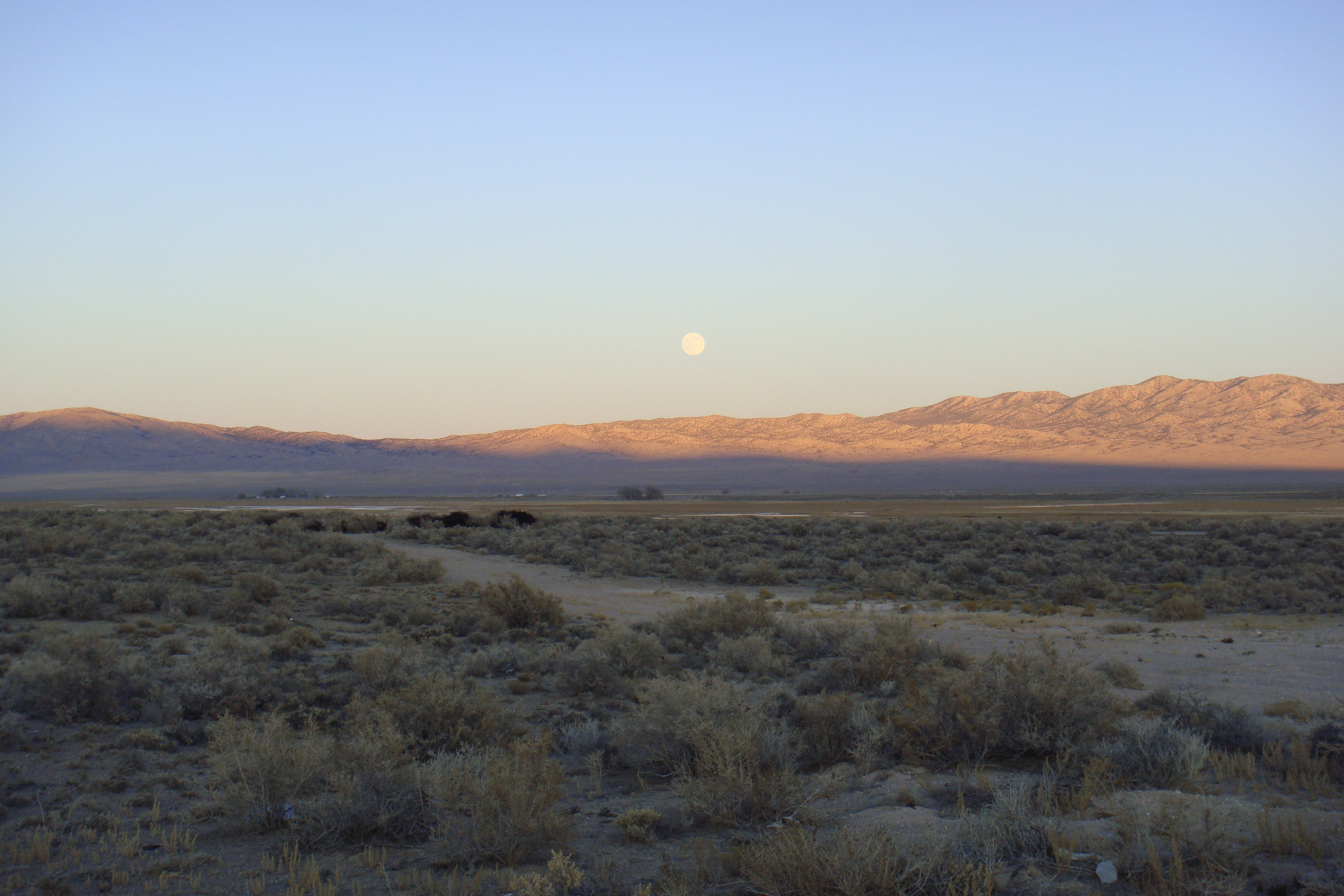
The Burbank Hills at sunset

The Burbank Hills are a small northwest-southeast mountain range in western Utah, United States that lie entirely within the Hamlin-Snake Watershed, between the Snake Range and the Ferguson Desert. It is bounded by Snake Valley to the north, west, and south; and trends into the Tunnel Springs Mountains, to the southeast, opposite the Antelope Valley on its southeast border. It was named after the settlement of Burbank, Utah, and Margie Burbank Clay, the wife of local Judge E. W. Clay in the 1870s.

The Burbank Hills has numerous ATV trails and fossils.

== Geology ==
The structural trend of rocks in the range is similar to rocks in the northern Mountain Home Range to the southwest and Conger Range and central Confusion Range to the northeast. These are chiefly Devonian to Permian carbonate rocks arranged in a massive 30-by-50-mile (48 by 80 km) syncline.
