= Wah Wah Mountains =

Mountain range in Utah, U.S.

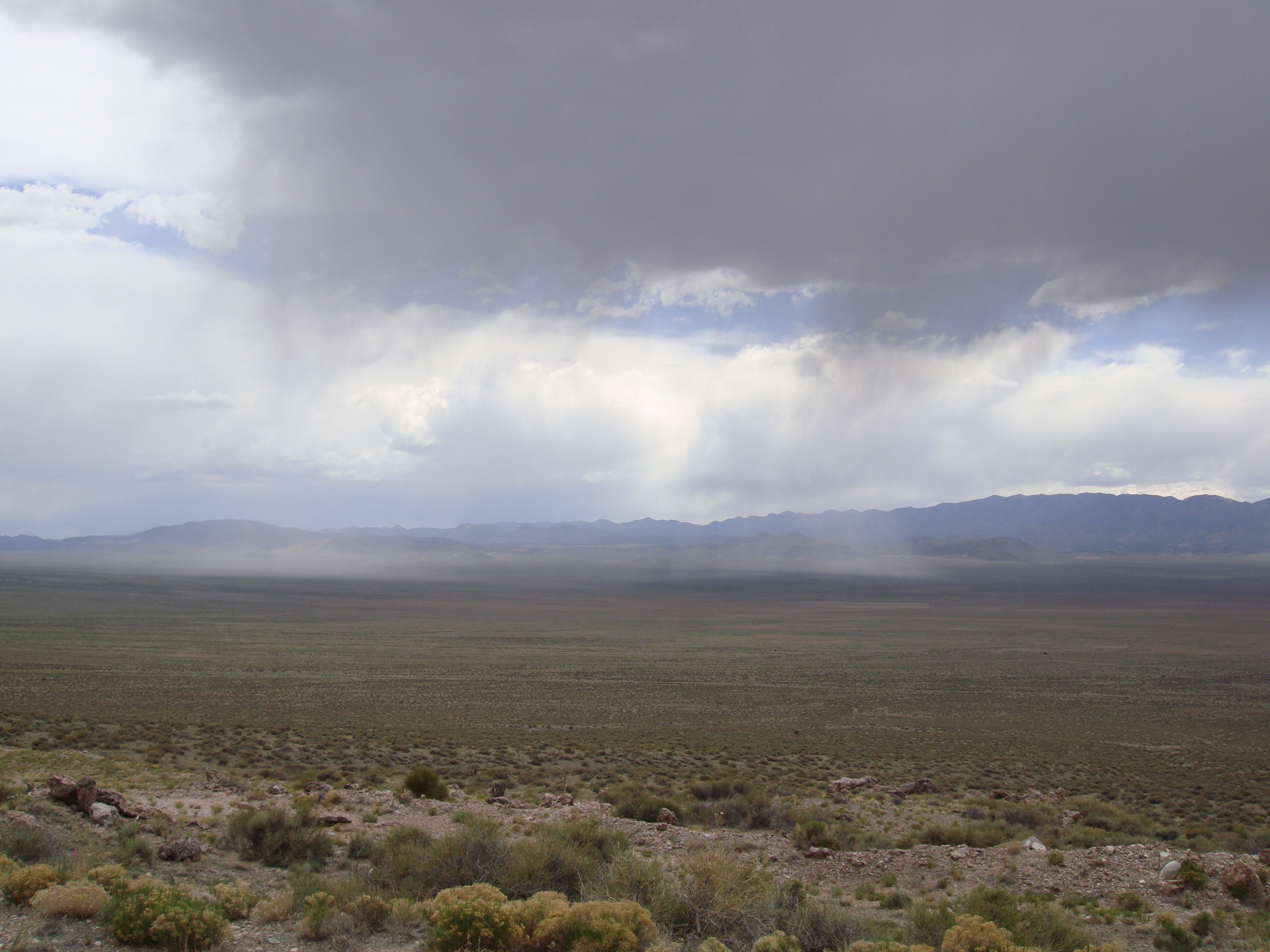
- A storm hits Wah Wah Valley and the Wah Wah Mountains.

Highest point
- Peak: Wah Wah Mountains High Point
- Elevation: 9,393 ft (2,863 m)
- Coordinates: 38°21′15″N 113°35′12″W

Dimensions
- Length: 63 mi (101 km) N/S
- Width: 27 mi (43 km) E/W
- Area: 924 mi^{2} (2,390 km^{2})

Geography
- Location within Utah
- Country: United States
- State: Utah

The Wah Wah Mountains are a north–south trending range in Iron, Beaver, and Millard counties in west-central Utah, United States part of the larger Basin and Range Province.

== Description ==
The range is bounded by Pine Valley to the west, Wah Wah Valley to the east, the Escalante Desert to the south, and on trend with the Confusion Range to the north. The Wah Wah Mountains are located in Beaver and Millard counties. State Route 21 bisects the range, crossing over Wah Wah Summit at about 6,500 feet (1,980 m) above sea level. Elevations range from about 6,000 feet (1,800 m) at the mountain front to 9,393 feet (2,863 m) in the southern Wah Wahs.

The "Wah Wah" name comes from Wah Wah Springs, on the eastern slope of the mountain range. "Wah Wah" is reported to mean "good clear water".

The Bureau of Land Management, which administers most of the land within the Wah Wah Mountains, has designated two wilderness study areas, one in the north and one in the central portion of the range.

== Geology ==
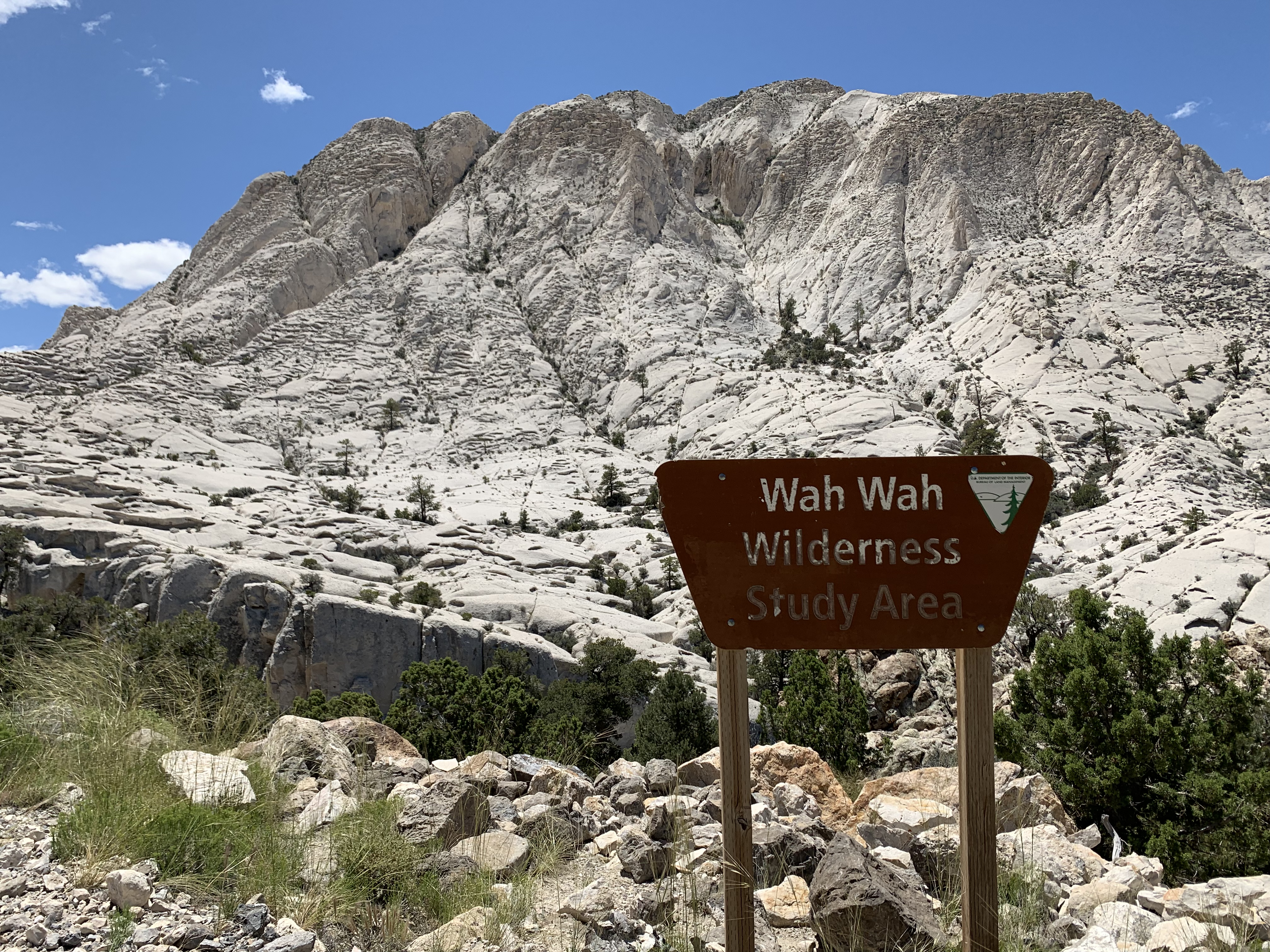
Northern Wah Wah Wilderness Study Area, with Crystal Peak in the background.

The Wah Wah Mountains are made up of Neoproterozoic- to Paleozoic-aged sedimentary rocks (limestone, dolomite, shale, and sandstone metamorphized into quartzite), overlain by younger Tertiary volcanic rocks (basalt, andesite, dacite, rhyolite, and tuff) on the eastern flank of the range. A series of thrust faults cut through the sedimentary rocks in the southern end of the range. It is notable as the only known source of a rare red beryl gemstone, which is mined commercially. Perhaps, the most famous geologic feature is Crystal Peak, in the northern part of the range (near the pass between the Wah Wah Mountains and the Confusion Range). It is an erosional remnant of a Paleogene rhyolite tuff that has abundant doubly terminated crystals of quartz. The Wah Wah Mountains were the site of a massive supervolcano eruption 30 million years ago that ejected more than 5,900 cubic kilometers of material. An additional reference to the geology of the range is the map by Hintze and Davis.

== Ecology ==
The plant species Terraria haydenii, commonly known as Frisco Mountains mustard, is endemic to the Wah Wah Mountains, where it is known only from two small populations.

== In other media ==
- The Wah Wah Mountains are featured in the science fiction novel EarthCore by Scott Sigler.

== See also ==
- List of mountain ranges of Utah
