= Echo State Park =

State park in Utah, United States

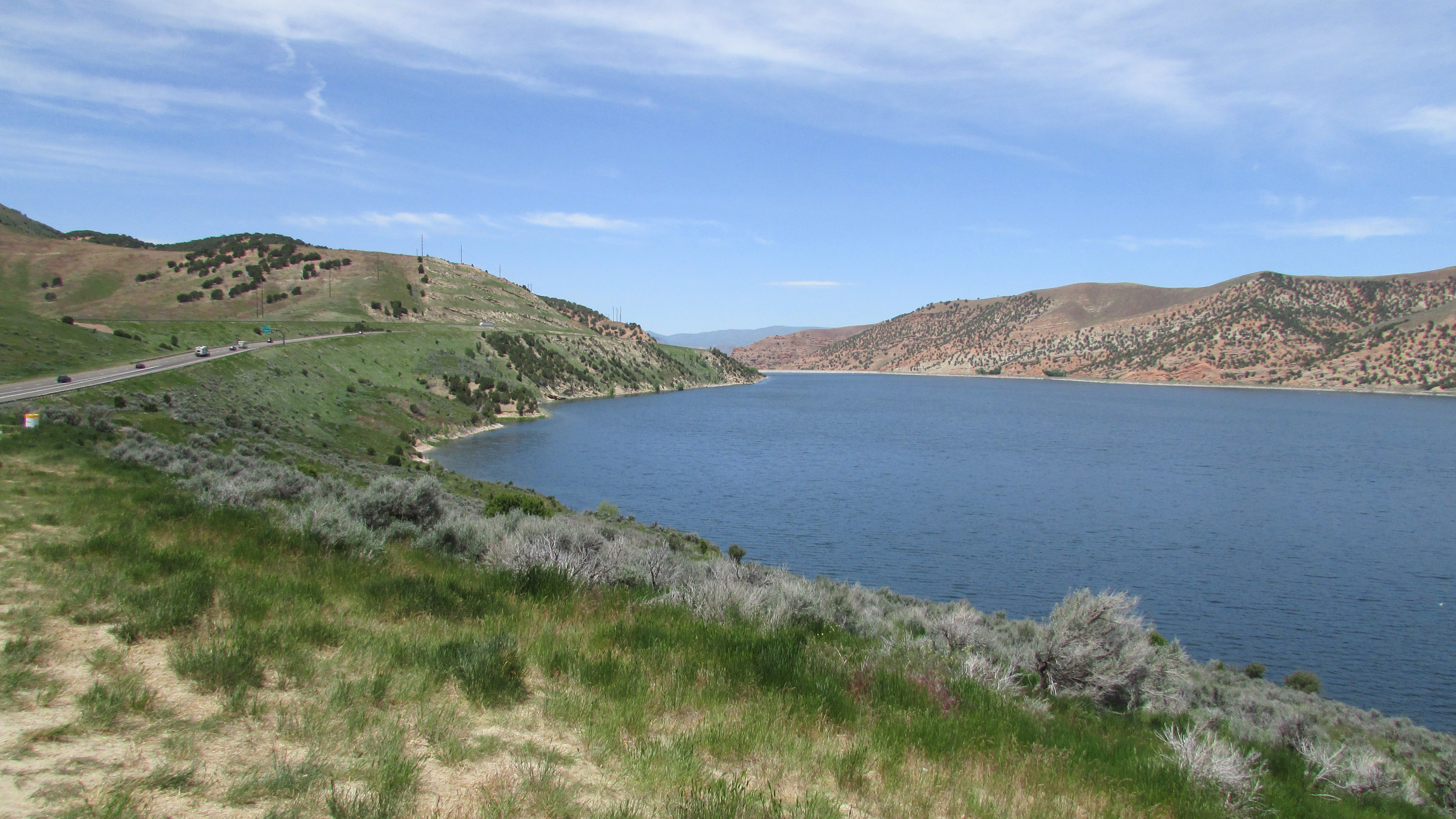
- Echo Reservoir

- Location within Utah Location within the United States
- Interactive map of Echo State Park
- Location: Summit County, Utah, United States
- Coordinates: 40°57′30″N 111°24′28″W
- Elevation: 5,560 ft (1,690 m)
- Opened: 2018
- Operator: Utah State Parks
- Visitors: 125,620 (in 2025)
- Website: Official website
- Utah State Parks

Echo State Park is a state park on the Echo Reservoir in northwestern Summit County, Utah, United States, just west of the city of Coalville. The park occupies the site of the former Echo Resort which closed in 2017. Park activities include boating, fishing, hiking and camping.

== See also ==
- List of Utah State Parks
