= Utah State Route 202 =

Highway in Utah

State Route 202
- SR-202 in red

Route information
- Maintained by UDOT
- Length: 1.683 mi (2.709 km)
- Existed: 1969–present

Major junctions
- South end: SR-201 near Magna, Utah
- North end: I-80 near Great Salt Lake

Location
- Country: United States
- State: Utah

Highway system
- Utah State Highway System; Interstate; US; State; Minor; Scenic
← SR-201	→ SR-203

State Route 202 (SR-202) is a 1.683-mile (2.709 km) long state highway in the U.S. state of Utah that serves as a connector, linking SR-201 to Interstate 80 (I-80) in rural Salt Lake County. The road has existed since at least 1937, when it connected U.S. Route 40 (US-40) and US-50 via the Garfield Cut-Off Road. It also serves as the eastbound on-ramp for I-80.

== Route description ==
Located entirely in Salt Lake County, Utah, SR-202 begins at an intersection with SR-201 and 11500 West northwest of Magna, Utah. The road travels northwesterly, bordered on the east by a large tailing pond owned by Kennecott Utah Copper and part of the former Denver and Rio Grande Western Railroad rail line, which is now owned by the Union Pacific Railroad (UP). The parallel rail line intersects a pair of east–west rail lines, the southern line being UP main line, and the northern line being the Feather River Route of the former Western Pacific Railroad, which is now owned by UP. After crossing the rail lines, SR-202 intersects with I-80 near the Great Salt Lake State Park and comes to a terminus at the I-80 frontage road, which provides access to the Great Salt Lake State Park and to the Saltair resort. Kennecott Utah Copper owns all of the land surrounding SR-202, except for the right-of-way for the railroad, and the highway itself.

SR-202 serves as the eastbound ramp from SR-201 onto Interstate I-80, because at its intersection with I-80, the SR-201 (which is the southern terminus of SR-202) traffic only has the option to continue on I-80 westbound, and does not have an offramp to eastbound I-80. Traffic on SR-202 has increased 12% between 2002 and 2007, with a daily average of 735 cars per day using SR-202 in 2007, compared to 475 cars per day in 2002. Half of the traffic on SR-202 consists of buses and trucks.

== History ==
Two other roads have been designated Utah State Route 202 in the past. From 1939 to 1953, the name was used by the road that formed the eastern approach to Mercur, Utah, and later became part of SR-73. From 1961 to 1967, the name was used by Main Street between SR-201 (2100 South) and SR-171 in downtown Salt Lake City, which is now part of Utah State Route 186.

The road that currently carries the SR-202 designation has existed since 1937, when it connected US-40 and US-50 along the Garfield Cut-Off Road. The Utah State Legislature designated the road SR-202 in 1969, thus taking responsibility of maintaining the road from the county. No changes or alterations have been made to SR-202, except for the legal definition of the road, which has changed twice since it was formed.

On September 26, 2008, a sulfuric acid spill occurred, reported by people in vehicles traveling on Interstate 80.

In 2015, as part of a federal-aid project, a traffic signal was installed at the junction with SR-201, which was moved slightly to the west; as a result, the south end of SR-202 was realigned, resulting in a net loss of approximately 0.21 miles (0.34 km) of state highway mileage.

== Major intersections ==
The entire route is in Salt Lake County.

mi	km	Destinations	Notes
0.000	0.000	SR-201 – Magna, Kennecott	Southern terminus
1.303– 1.596	2.097– 2.569	I-80 – Elko, Salt Lake City	
1.683	2.709	Saltair Drive / Frontage Road	Northern terminus
1.000 mi = 1.609 km; 1.000 km = 0.621 mi

== Gallery ==
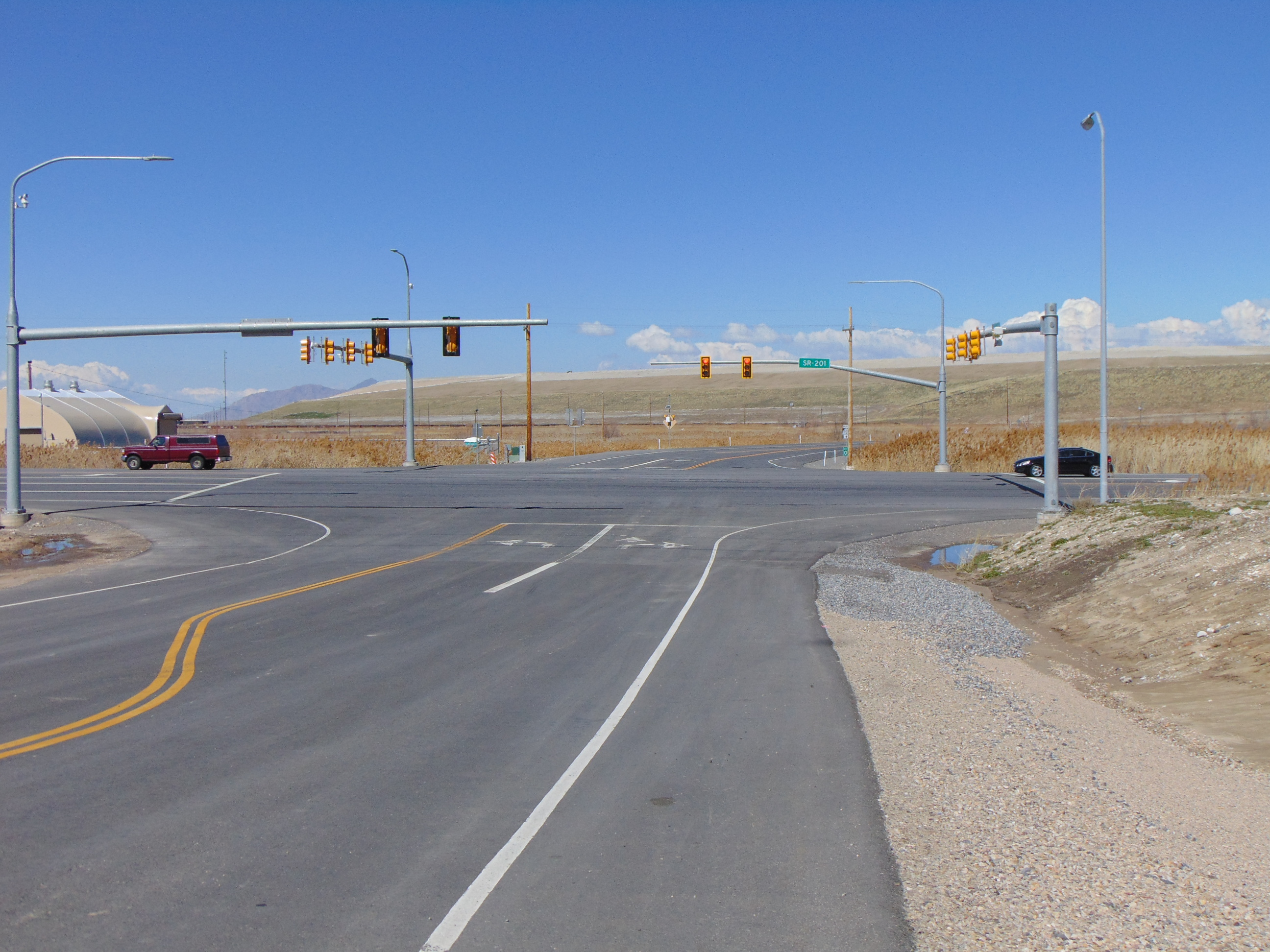
Looking north at the intersection of Utah State Route 201 and Utah State Route 202 (the southern terminus of SR-202), March 2016

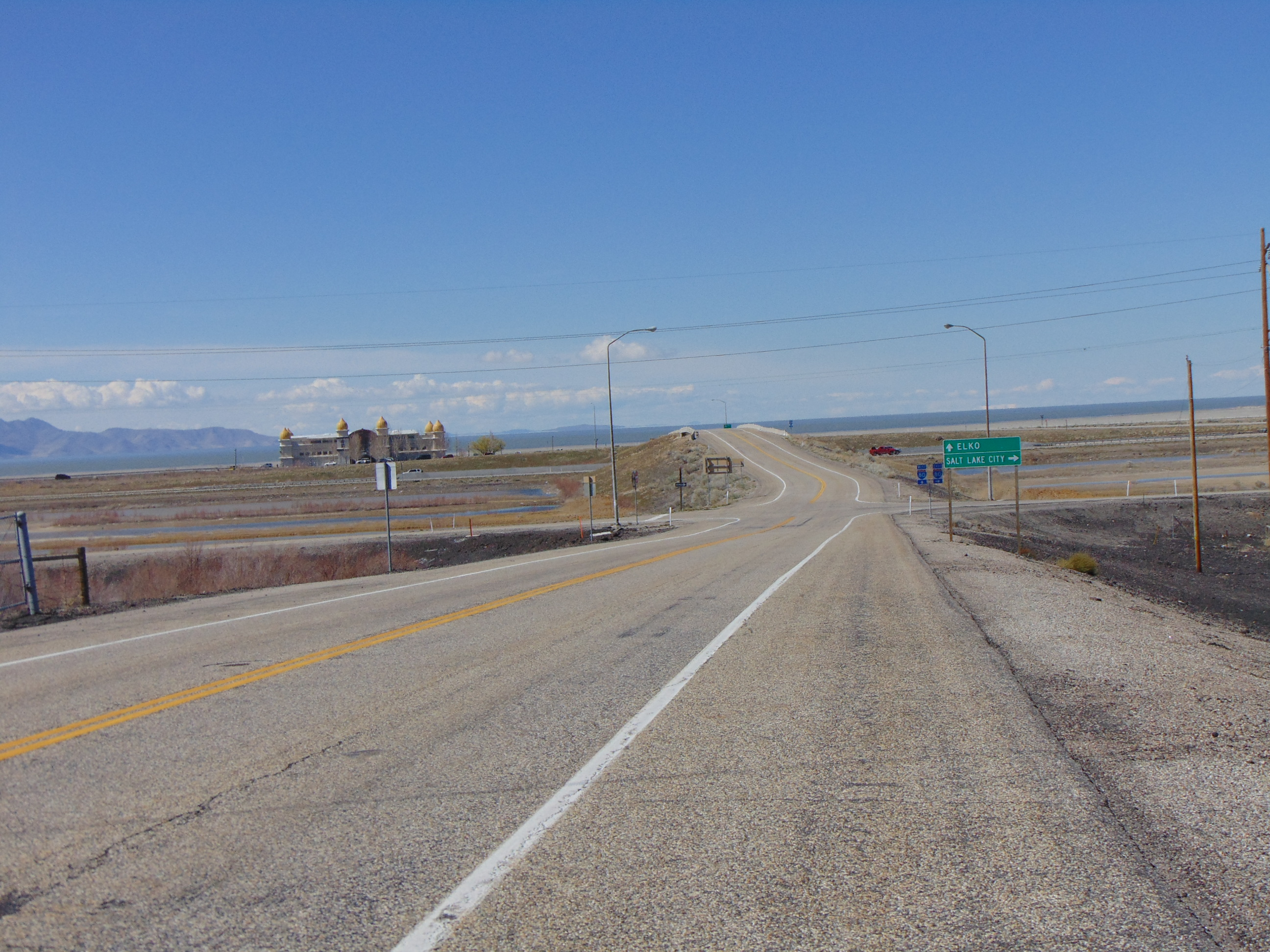
Looking northwest at the Interstate 80 and Utah State Route 202 interchange (the northern terminus of SR-202) with Stansbury Island, the Great Salt Lake, and Saltair in the background, March 2016

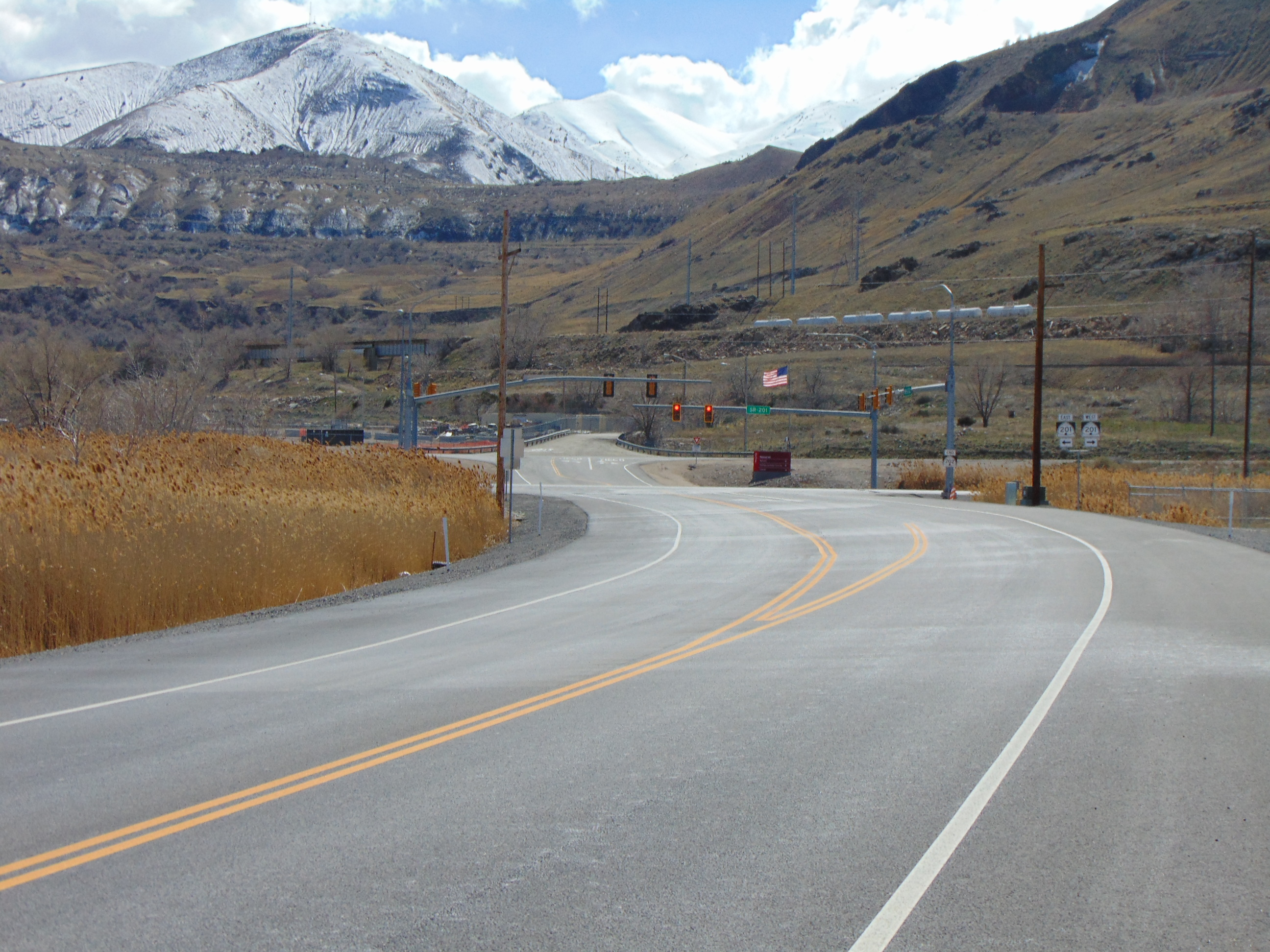
Looking south at the intersection of Utah State Route 201 and Utah State Route 202 (the southern terminus of SR-202) with the snow covered Oquirrh Mountains in the background, March 2016

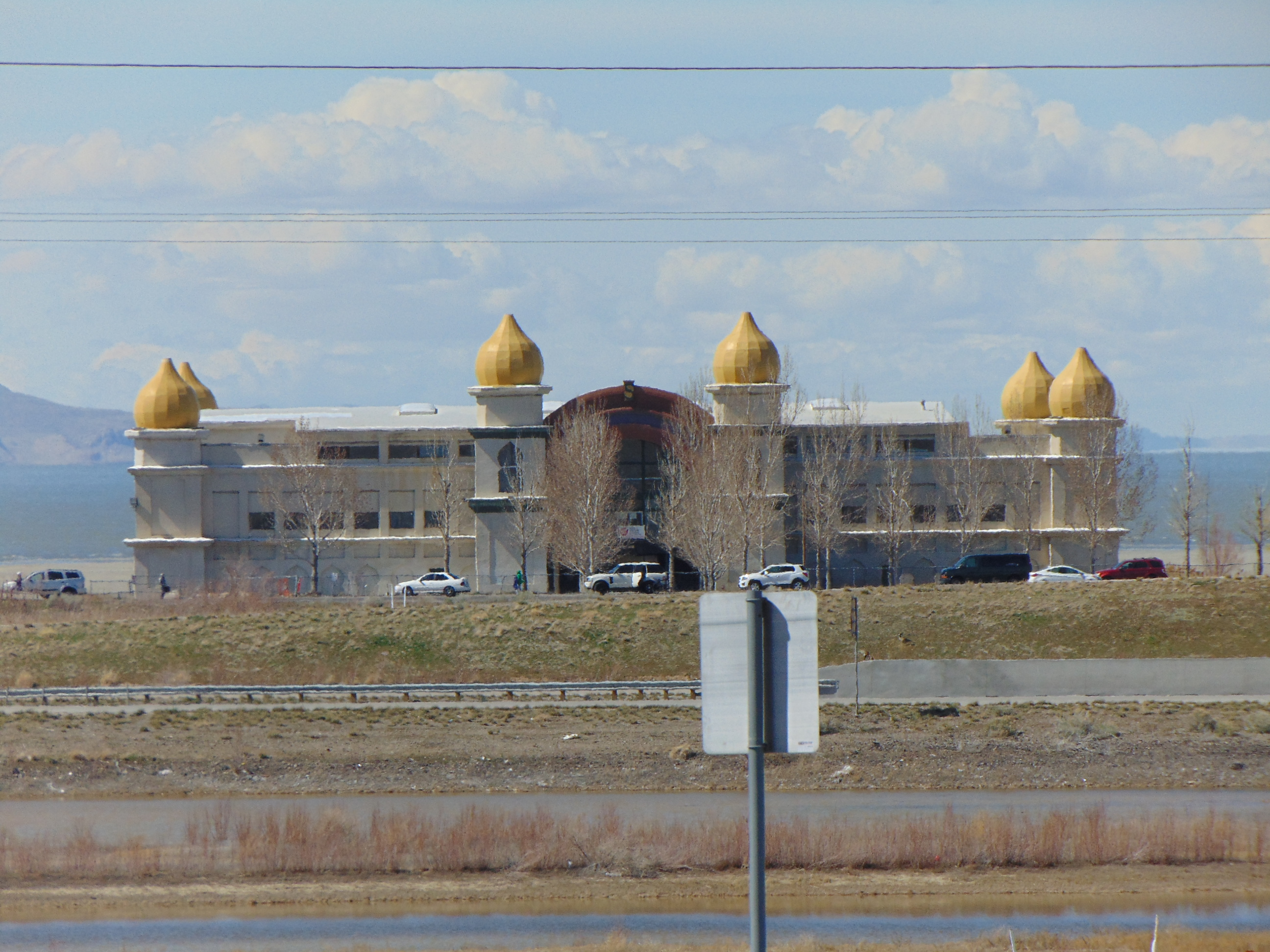
Looking northwest from Utah State Route 202 across Interstate 80 at Saltair, Utah, March 2016
