= Thomas L. Allen House =

Historic house in Utah, United States

- U.S. National Register of Historic Places
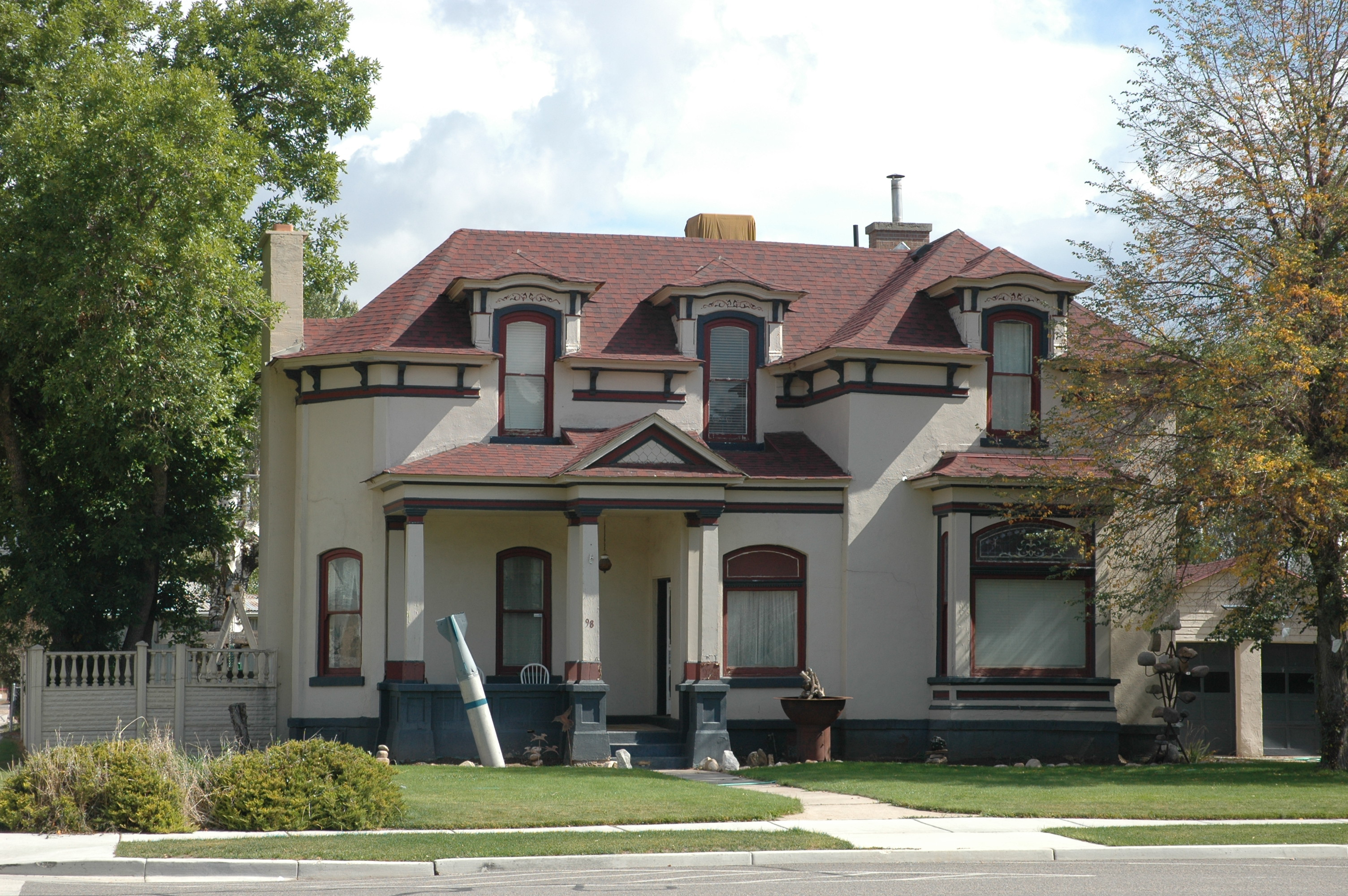

- Location within Utah Location within the United States
- Location: 98 N. Main St., Coalville, Utah
- Coordinates: 40°55′8″N 111°23′55″W
- Area: less than one acre
- Built: c. 1880
- Built by: Allen, Thomas L.
- Architectural style: Italianate, Victorian Eclectic
- NRHP reference No.: 82004161
- Added to NRHP: July 23, 1982

The Thomas L. Allen House is a historic house located at 98 North Main Street in Coalville, Utah.

== Description and history ==
Constructed in the 1880s, it is a "fine" house significant for association with Thomas L. Allen, who was an architect and builder as well as being a LDS area leader and a businessman. Allen is notable specifically for designing and building the National Register-listed Coalville Tabernacle, and built this house, too. A painted plaster ceiling in the parlor, by Danish immigrant C.M. Olsen, is a "highlight" of the house, and is similar to works by Olsen in the Coalville Tabernacle.

It was listed on the National Register of Historic Places on July 23, 1982.
