= List of Utah State Parks =

Utah State Parks is the common name for the Utah Division of State Parks; a division of the Utah Department of Natural Resources. This is the state agency that manages the state park system of the state of Utah in the United States.

Utah State Parks: green=recreational state park; red=state park museum

Utah's state park system began with four heritage parks in 1957: Sugar House Park (which was later removed from the system), Utah Territorial Statehouse in Fillmore, This Is the Place Monument in Salt Lake City, and Camp Floyd outside of Fairfield. Today, there are 46 Utah State Parks and several undeveloped areas totaling over 95,000 acres (380 km^{2}) of land and more than one million surface acres of water. Utah's state parks are scattered throughout Utah; from Bear Lake State Park at the Utah/Idaho border to Edge of the Cedars State Park Museum deep in the Four Corners region, and everywhere in between.

The Division of State Parks also administers the Utah off highway vehicle, boating, and trails programs. In this capacity, they work to provide access to waterways and trails, and promote education, safety, and resource protection.

The division's mission statement is "To enhance the quality of life by preserving and providing natural, cultural, and recreational resources for the enjoyment, education, and inspiration of this and future generations."

== Gallery ==
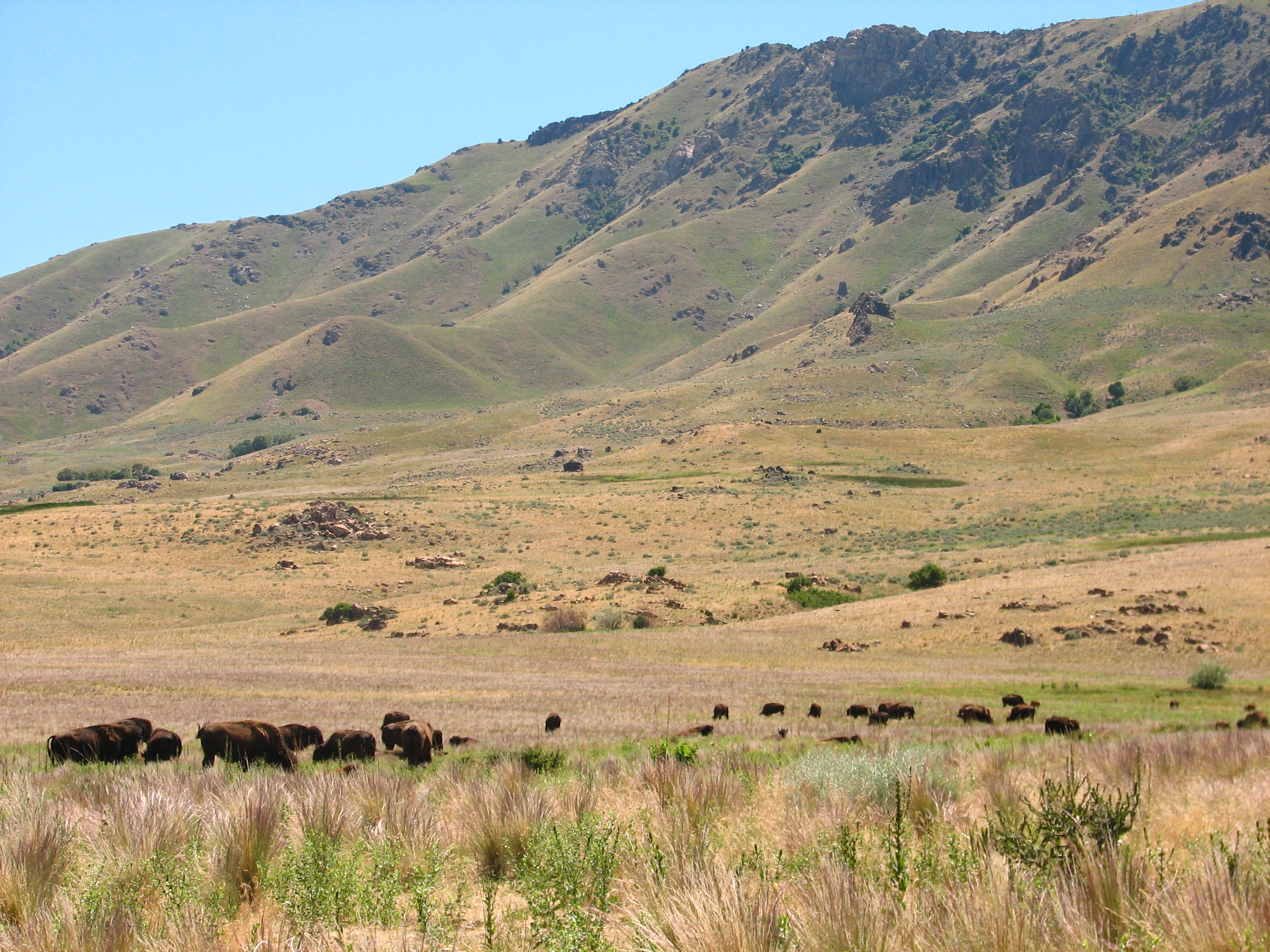
A herd of bison on Antelope Island

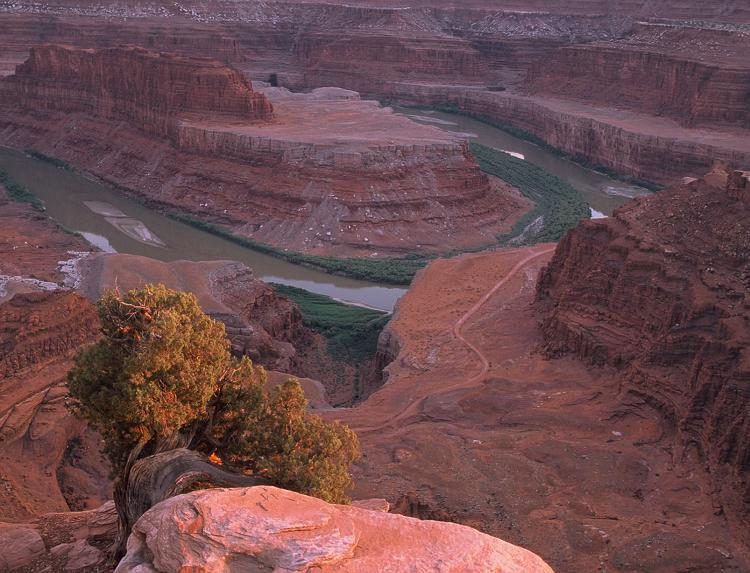
The Colorado River from Dead Horse Point State Park

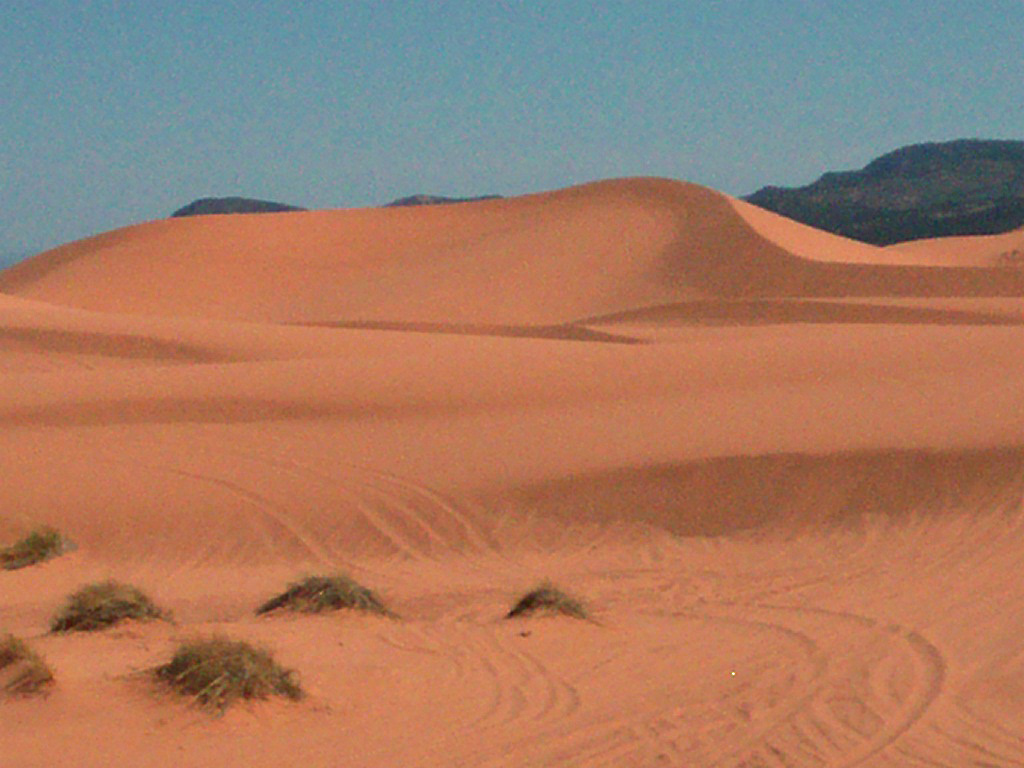
Coral Pink Sand Dunes State Park

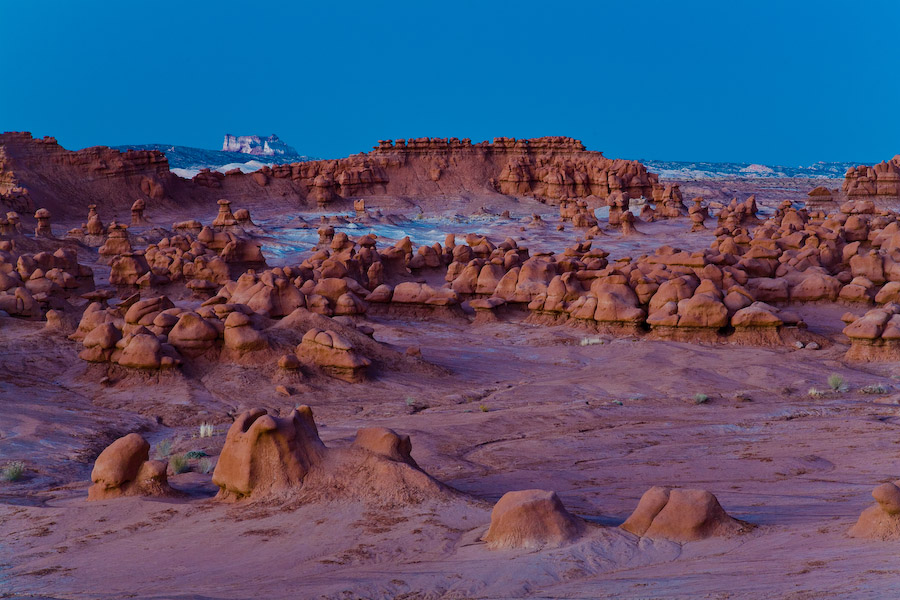
Goblin Valley State Park

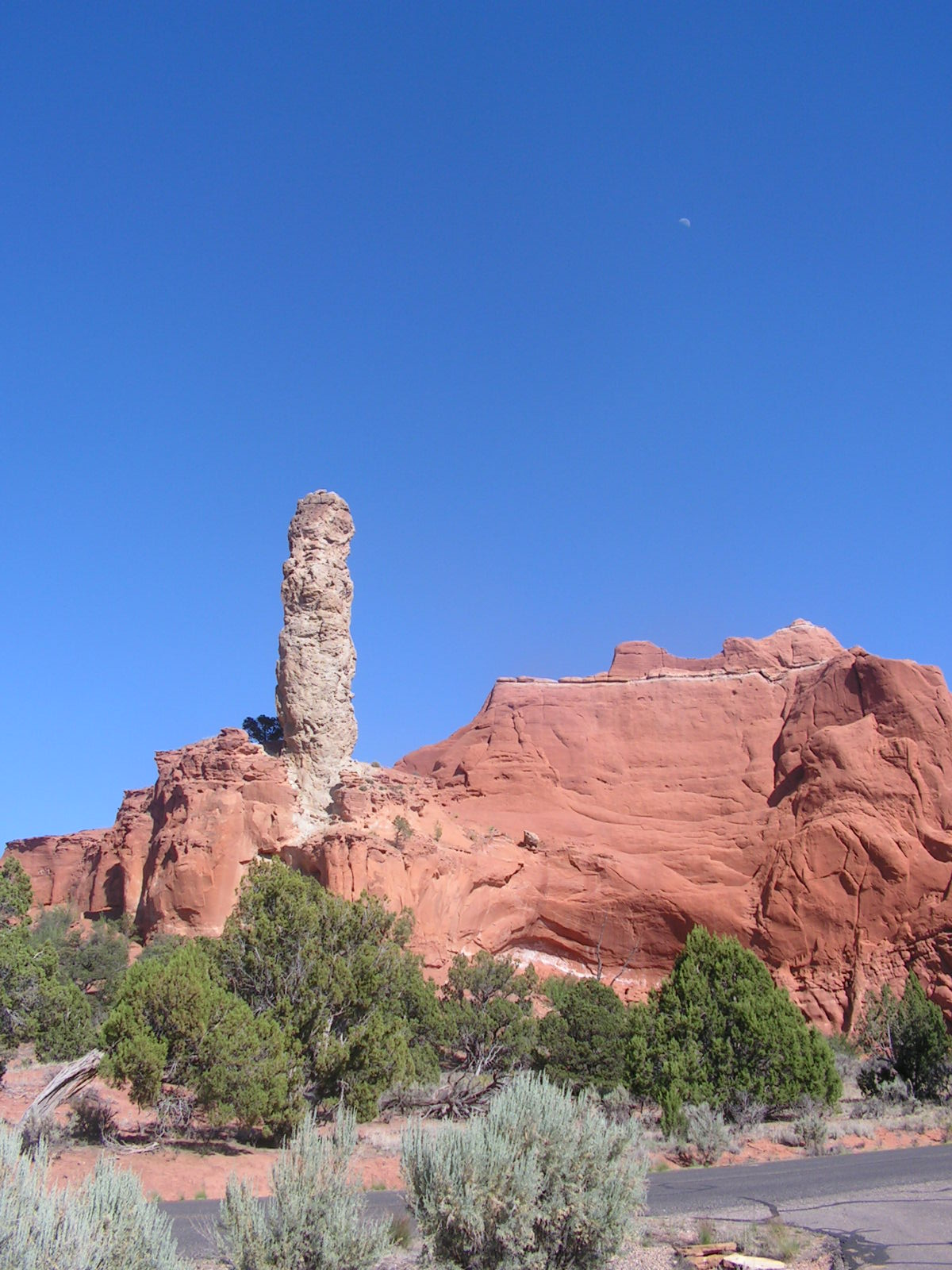
Sand pipe, Kodachrome Basin State Park

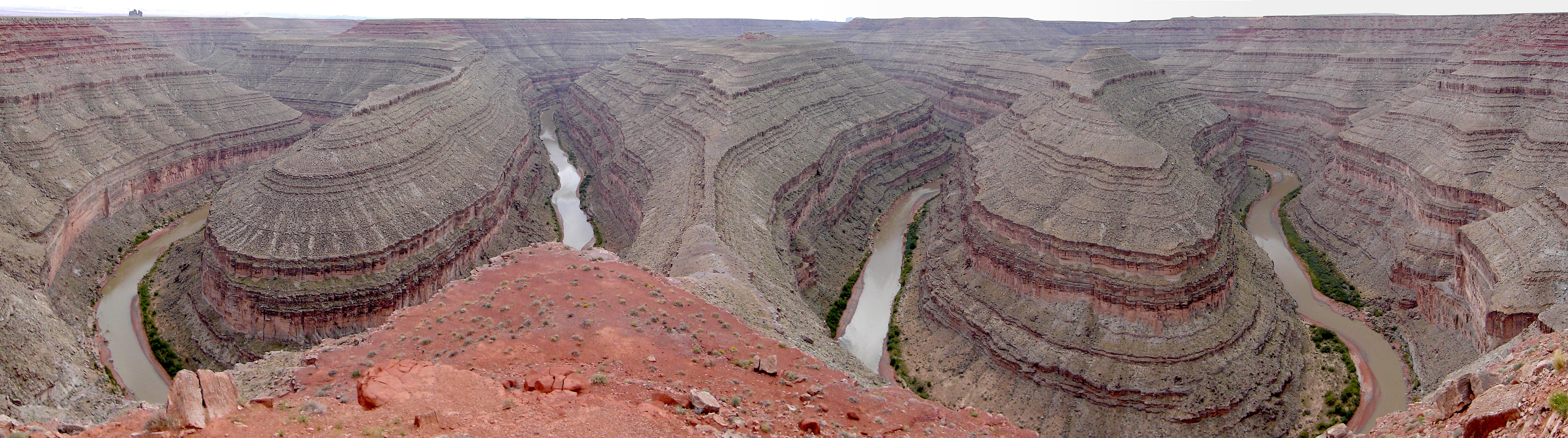
Goosenecks State Park

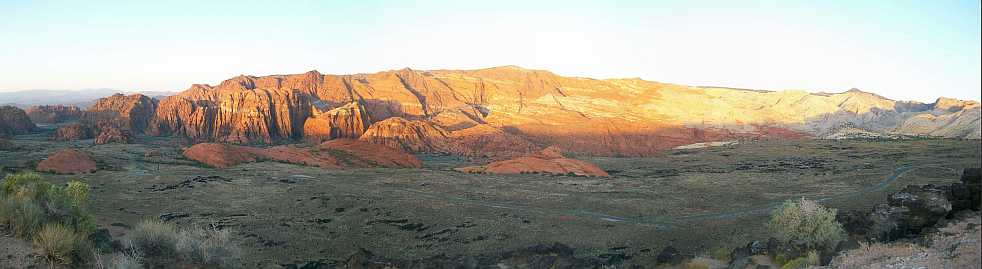
Snow Canyon State Park

== State parks ==
Name	Web- site	County	Size	Elevation	Estab- lished	Image	Notes
Anasazi State Park Museum		Garfield	6 acres (2.4 ha)	6,700 ft (2042 m)	1970		Interprets a large Ancestral Puebloan village occupied from AD 1160 to 1235.
Antelope Island State Park		Davis	22,022 acres (11340 ha)	5,308 ft (1618 m)	1969		Protects Antelope Island, the largest island in the Great Salt Lake and habitat for bison, Pronghorn, and bighorn sheep.
Bear Lake State Park		Rich		5,900 ft (1798 m)	1962		Comprises three units on Bear Lake.
Camp Floyd State Park Museum		Utah	40 acres (16 ha)	4,877 ft (1487 m)	1958		Interprets sites from the time of a massive 1858-1861 U.S. Army camp prompted by fear of the Utah War.
Coral Pink Sand Dunes State Park		Kane	3,730 acres (1510 ha)	6,000 ft (1829 m)	1963		Preserves the only dune field on the Colorado Plateau, with a unique color caused by iron oxides and minerals in the Navajo sandstone.
Dead Horse Point State Park		Grand and San Juan	5,300 acres (2145 ha)	5,900 ft (1798 m)	1959		Showcases views of the Colorado River and Canyonlands National Park from a finger of land once used as a horse corral.
Deer Creek State Park		Wasatch	3,260 acres (1319 ha)	5,400 ft (1646 m)	1971		Adjoins the extremely popular 2,965-acre (1,200 ha) Deer Creek Reservoir.
East Canyon State Park		Morgan	267 acres (108 ha)	5,700 ft (1737 m)	1962		Features a reservoir in a canyon first traversed by the Donner Party and soon thereafter by Mormon pioneers.
Echo State Park		Summit		5,560 ft (1,690 m)	2018		Echo Reservoir recreation.
Edge of the Cedars State Park Museum		San Juan	16 acres (6.5 ha)	6,200 ft (1890 m)	1978		Interprets an Ancestral Puebloan village occupied from AD 825 to 1125.
Escalante Petrified Forest State Park		Garfield	1,350 acres (546 ha)	5,900 ft (1798 m)	1976		Features petrified wood and other fossils plus a recreational reservoir.
Flight Park State Recreation Area		Salt Lake and Utah	147 acres (60 ha)	5,146 ft (1569 m)	2006		Offers one of the world's best training sites for hang gliding and parasailing, plus a modelport for radio control aircraft.
Fred Hayes State Park at Starvation		Duchesne	3,500 acres (1416 ha)	5,700 ft (1737 m)	1972		Features a 3,495-acre (1,414 ha) reservoir where early settlers once struggled against starvation.
Fremont Indian State Park and Museum		Sevier	889 acres (360 ha)	5,900 ft (1798 m)	1987		Preserves rock art and artifacts from the largest Fremont culture village yet discovered.
Frontier Homestead State Park Museum		Iron	11 acres (4 ha)	5,800 ft (1768 m)	1973		Preserves historic structures and equipment from the 1850s to the 1920s, including Old Iron Town and an extensive collection of horse-drawn vehicles. Formerly called Iron Mission State Park.
Goblin Valley State Park		Emery	3,654 acres (1479 ha)	5,000 ft (1524 m)	1974		Showcases an unearthly landscape of hoodoos and other rock formations.
Goosenecks State Park		San Juan	10 acres (4 ha)	4,500 ft (1372 m)	1962		Overlooks some dramatic meanders of the San Juan River.
Great Salt Lake State Park		Salt Lake	162 acres (66 ha)	4,200 ft (1280 m)	1978		Maintains a public boat launch and 320-slip marina on the Great Salt Lake.
Green River State Park		Emery	53 acres (21 ha)	4,050 ft (1234 m)	1965		Features a shady campground, nine-hole golf course, and float trip launching on the Green River.
Gunlock State Park		Washington	549 acres (222 ha)	3,600 ft (1097 m)	1970		Adjoins a 266-acre (108 ha) reservoir.
Historic Union Pacific Rail Trail State Park		Summit	450 acres (182 ha)	6,900 ft (2103 m)	1992		Comprises a 28-mile (45 km) rail trail on a route used by the Union Pacific Railroad from 1880 to 1989.
Huntington State Park		Emery	111 acres (45 ha)	5,840 ft (1780 m)	1966		Features a warm-water reservoir.
Hyrum State Park		Cache	264 acres (107 ha)	4,700 ft (1433 m)	1959		Surrounds a 450-acre (180 ha) reservoir.
Jordan River Off-Highway Vehicle State Recreation Area		Salt Lake	350 acres (142 ha)	4,700 ft (1433 m)	2002		Offers four tracks for off highway vehicles along the Jordan River.
Jordanelle State Park		Wasatch		6,166 ft (1879 m)	1995		Comprises two recreation areas on Jordanelle Reservoir.
Kodachrome Basin State Park		Kane	2,240 acres (906 ha)	5,800 ft (1768 m)	1963		Showcases 67 rock spires and other geologic wonders in a basin so photogenic it was named after Kodachrome film.
Lost Creek State Park		Morgan			2021		Largely undeveloped, offering vault restrooms, primitive campground, boat ramp.
Millsite State Park		Emery	638 acres (258 ha)	6,100 ft (1859 m)	1971		Features a reservoir and lands for off highway vehicles and mountain biking.
Otter Creek State Park		Piute	80 acres (32 ha)	5,900 ft (1798 m)	1964		Features a 3,120-acre (1,260 ha) reservoir, begun in 1897 as one of the earliest dam projects in Utah.
Palisade State Park		Sanpete	64 acres (26 ha)	5,800 ft (1768 m)	1962		Features a reservoir and 18-hole golf course on the former site of a private resort founded in the 1860s.
Piute State Park		Piute	40 acres (16 ha)	5,900 ft (1798 m)	1963		Protects a quiet fishing reservoir on the Sevier River.
Quail Creek State Park		Washington		3,300 ft (1006 m)	1986		Adjoins a 600-acre (240 ha) reservoir surrounded by red rock desert.
Red Fleet State Park		Uintah	1,963 acres (794 ha)	5,500 ft (1676 m)	1988		Features a 750-acre (300 ha) reservoir and a fossil trackway of dinosaur footprints.
Rockport State Park		Summit	550 acres (223 ha)	6,000 ft (1829 m)	1966		Features a 1,080-acre (440 ha) reservoir.
Sand Hollow State Park		Washington	20,611 acres (8341 ha)	3,000 ft (914 m)	2003		Features a 1,322-acre (535 ha) reservoir and an extensive off highway vehicle recreation area.
Scofield State Park		Carbon		7,600 ft (2316 m)	1965		Features a 2,800-acre (1,100 ha) reservoir.
Snow Canyon State Park		Washington	7,400 acres (2995 ha)	3,100 ft (945 m)	1962		Showcases a canyon carved out of colorful Navajo sandstone and landforms created by the Santa Clara Volcano.
Steinaker State Park		Uintah	2,283 acres (924 ha)	5,500 ft (1676 m)	1964		Features an 820-acre (330 ha) reservoir.
This Is the Place Heritage Park		Salt Lake	450 acres (182 ha)	4,921 ft (1500 m)	1957		Interprets Utah's settlement era with a living history village and This Is the Place Monument.
Utahraptor State Park		Grand			2021		Features the Dalton Wells Dinosaur Quarry
Territorial Statehouse State Park Museum		Millard	3 acres (1.2 ha)	5,100 ft (1554 m)	1957		Interprets the capitol of Utah Territory, the state's oldest government building, constructed between 1852 and 1855.
Utah Field House of Natural History State Park Museum		Uintah	2 acres (0.8 ha)	5,300 ft (1615 m)	1959		Houses a state-owned museum of natural history.
Utah Lake State Park		Utah	308 acres (125 ha)	4,500 ft (1372 m)	1970		Adjoins Utah Lake, the state's largest body of fresh water.
Wasatch Mountain State Park		Wasatch	21,592 acres (8738 ha)	5,900 ft (1798 m)	1968		Features extensive recreational developments, including facilities built for the 2002 Winter Olympics.
Willard Bay State Park		Box Elder		4,200 ft (1280 m)	1966		Provides water recreation opportunities on a 9,900-acre (4,000 ha) freshwater reservoir on the floodplain of the Great Salt Lake.
Yuba State Park		Juab and Sanpete	15,940 acres (6451 ha)	5,100 ft (1554 m)	1970		Features a reservoir on the Sevier River.
