= Traverse Mountains =

Mountain range separating the Salt Lake Valley and Utah Valley

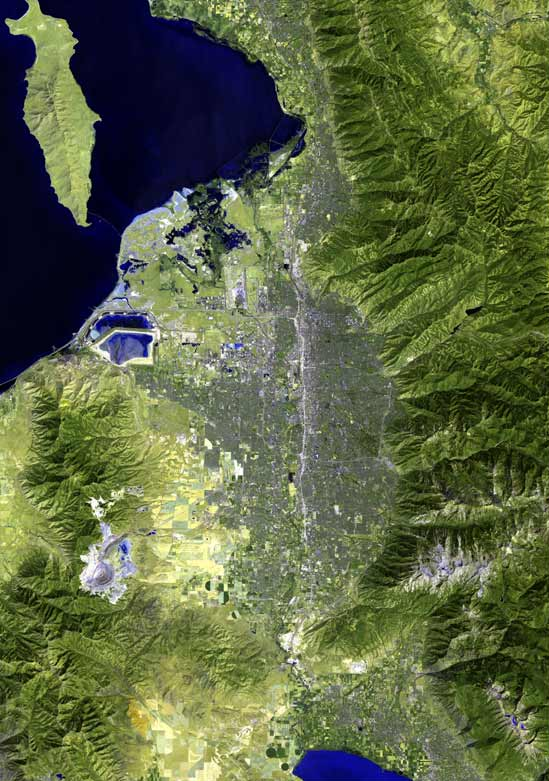
- Traverse Mtns, SLC and Utah Lake-(6-mi south) (Note: N-S, white line is Interstate 15-SLC)

Highest point
- Coordinates: 40°28′19″N 111°52′59″W

Geography
- Location within Utah
- Country: United States
- State: Utah

The Traverse Mountains, or sometimes Traverse Range, are an east-trending mountain range that separates Salt Lake Valley and Utah Valley in Salt Lake and Utah counties in the U.S. State of Utah. The mountains have some anomalous features, possibly due to having been created in a vast landslide, and are considered geologically complex.

Point of the Mountain is colloquially used to refer to a feature of this range that juts out prominently to the west, marking an informal boundary line separating the metropolitan areas of Salt Lake City and Provo. Point of the Mountain also describes the nearby mountain pass at 40°27′13″N 111°54′38″W, used by the highways and rail arteries that connect the two areas.

== Description ==
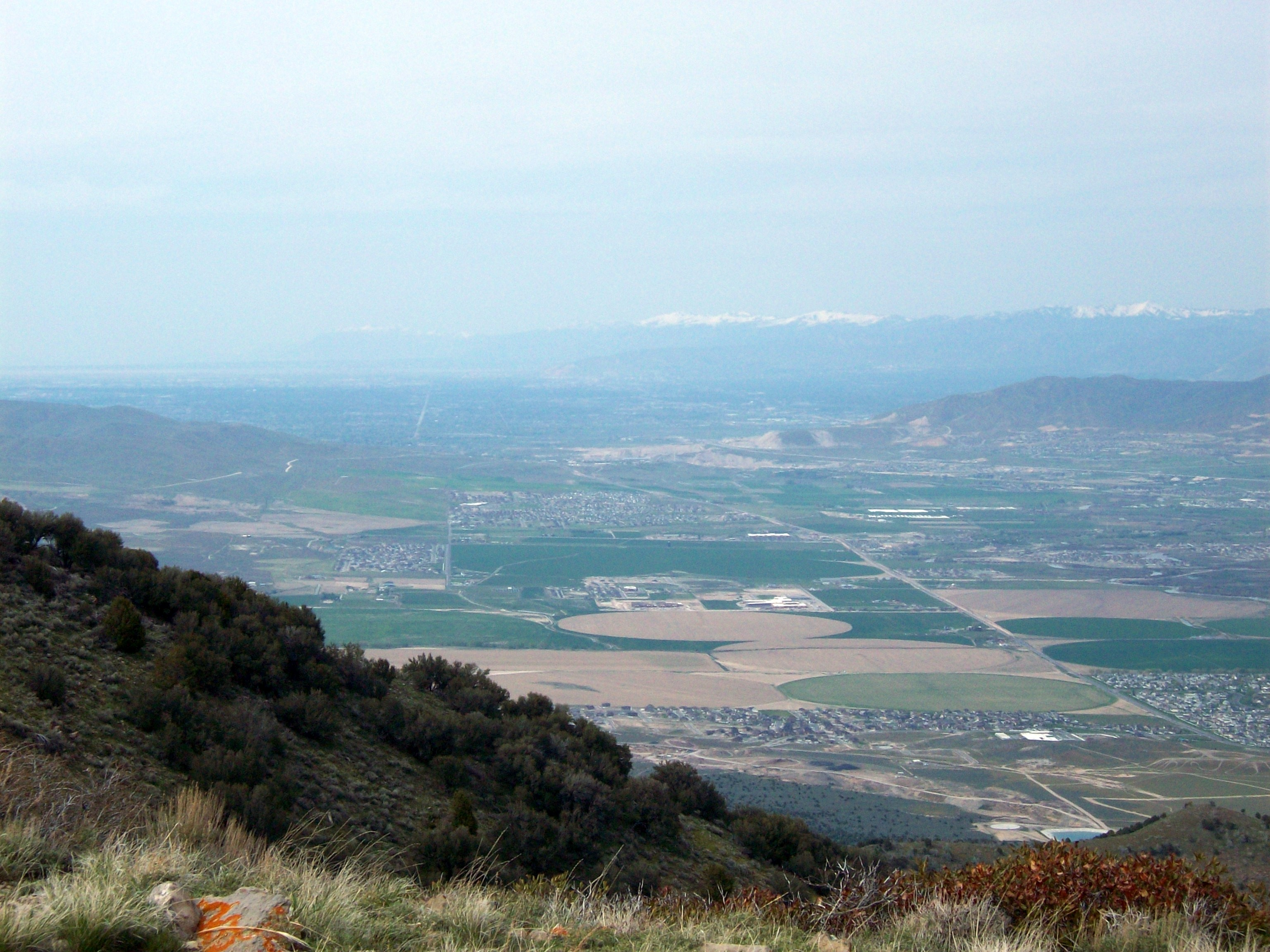
Looking north-northeast from the top of Lake Mountains, May 2009. Oquirrh Mountains at photo-left, Traverse Mountains at photo-right. Salt Lake City & Wasatch Range on horizon

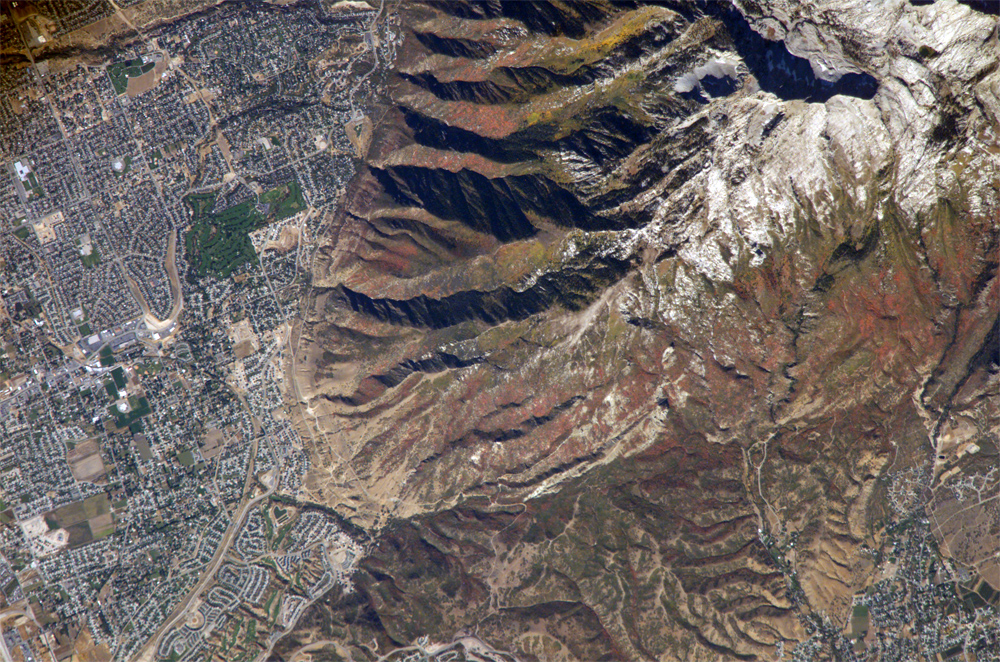
Northeast half of Traverse Mountains showing Hog Hollow and Fort Canyon, (Lone Mountain massif northeasterly; Photo North is rotated 45 Degrees, left; ISS photo; September 2005

The Traverse Mountains mark the boundary between the Salt Lake and Provo segments of the Wasatch Fault, and they are much faulted and locally involved in landslides. Lake Bonneville once covered Salt Lake and Utah Valleys, and shorelines and deposits from the ice age lake are now etched into the flanks of the Traverse Mountains.

The eastern section of the range (often called Traverse Mountain) is split up between the cities of Lehi and Draper. The Draper portion contains the Suncrest community, while the Lehi portion contains the Traverse Mountain community. Between the two communities, the Flight Park State Recreation Area (state park) sits atop the range. The western section of the range is part of the Camp Williams National Guard Training Site.

Two locations on the far west end of the eastern section of the range are Point of the Mountain and Steep Mountain, 6,160 feet (1,878 m).

== East Traverse Mountains Mega-landslide ==
Research publicized in 2017 suggests the entirety of the East Traverse Mountains, from the Point of the Mountain to Corner Canyon, is a single mega-landslide, 57 km^{2} in area, that was emplaced in a landslide event between 6.5 and 6.1 million years ago. The East Traverse Mountains previously included the upper portion of the mountains to the south of Little Cottonwood Canyon, overlying the 30.5-26 million year old granitic intrusive rocks of the Little Cottonwood stock. A catastrophic landslide event, perhaps triggered by an earthquake along the adjacent Wasatch Fault, displaced the Paleozoic sedimentary rocks about 16-17 kilometers (~10 miles) west to its current location.

There are several lines of evidence that support this idea. Pseudotachylyte zones in the area, caused by intense frictional heat, mark the landslide's path. Extensive brecciation of bedrock throughout the East Traverse Mountains are evidence of an extremely damaging event that affected the whole mountain. Additionally, a brecciated remnant of the landslide was preserved near Box Elder Peak. Finally, there are pebble dikes on the East Traverse Mountains, which include pieces of igneous rock that match those in pebble dikes from the Little Cottonwood stock in age, texture, and mineralogy. Thus, the pebble dikes in Little Cottonwood Canyon represent the lower half of the hydrothermal system, while the upper half of the system is represented by the pebble dikes that are lodged in the rocks that now make up the East Traverse Mountains before the landslide. Several million years later, the landslide occurred, carrying the upper half of the granite-bearing pebble dikes with it. The slide probably occurred in this area due to hydrothermal alteration caused by the Little Cottonwood intrusion that weakened the overlying rocks.

== See also ==
- List of mountains in Utah
