= Flight Park State Recreation Area =

State park in Utah, United States

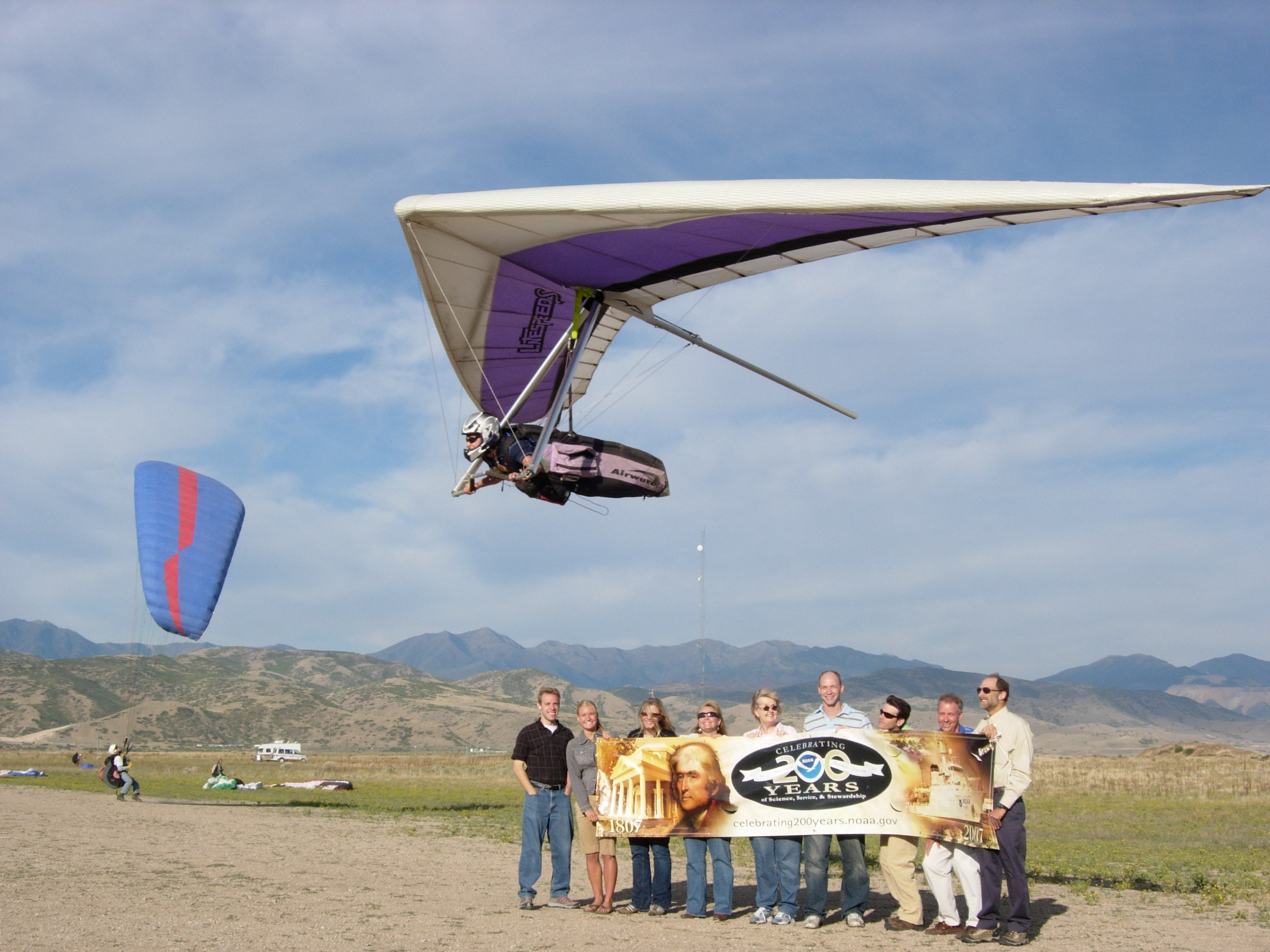

- Location within Utah Location within the United States
- Interactive map of Flight Park State Recreation Area
- Location: Lehi, Utah, United States
- Coordinates: 40°27′28″N 111°54′4″W
- Area: 147 acres (59 ha)
- Elevation: 5,146 ft (1,569 m)
- Opened: 2006
- Operator: Utah State Parks, Utah Hang Gliding and Paragliding Association
- Website: Official website
- Utah State Parks

Flight Park State Recreation Area is a state park in northern Utah, United States, dedicated to hang gliding and paragliding.

== Description ==
The park is located on the south side of Point of the Mountain, just north of Lehi. Flight Park is jointly managed by Utah State Parks and the Utah Hang Gliding and Paragliding Association (UHGPGA). It is known as one of the best training sites for both paragliding and hang gliding.

Just west of the parking lot there is a modelport for radio control airplanes and helicopters.

The park is located almost entirely in northern Utah County, although a tiny section of its northwest corner extends into Salt Lake County, according to the map on its official website.

== See also ==
- List of Utah State Parks
