= Jordan River Off-Highway Vehicle State Recreation Area =

State park in Utah, United States

Jordan River Off-Highway Vehicle State Park
- Location within Utah Location within the United States
- Interactive map of Jordan River Off-Highway Vehicle State Park
- Location: Salt Lake County, Utah, United States
- Coordinates: 40°49′32″N 111°56′39″W
- Area: 350 acres (140 ha)
- Elevation: 4,210 ft (1,280 m)
- Operator: Utah State Parks
- Visitors: 23,261 (in 2025)
- Website: Official website
- Utah State Parks

Jordan River Off-Highway Vehicle State Recreation Area is a public recreation located in Salt Lake City, Utah, United States. The state park is dedicated to recreation with off highway vehicles. It consists of four separate tracks, with tabletops and banked turns, and is open from approximately early April to approximately mid-October. Off-highway motorcycle (OHM) riders have access to two motocross tracks. The novice and grand-prix tracks are open to both OHMs and all-terrain vehicles.
