= Salt Lake Valley =

Geographic depression in northern Utah, US, containing Salt Lake City and its suburbs

Coordinates: 40.6839°N 111.978°W

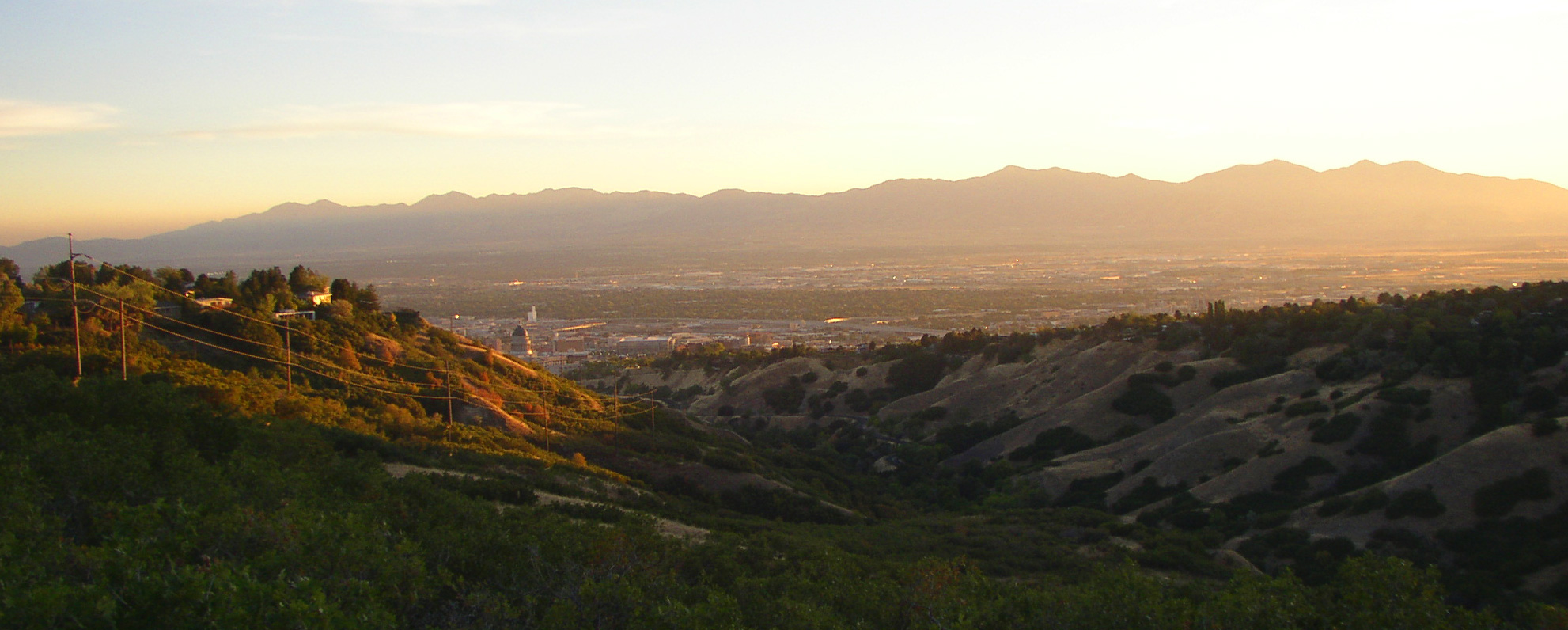
A portion of the Salt Lake Valley with the Oquirrh Mountains in the background, as seen looking southwest from City Creek Canyon

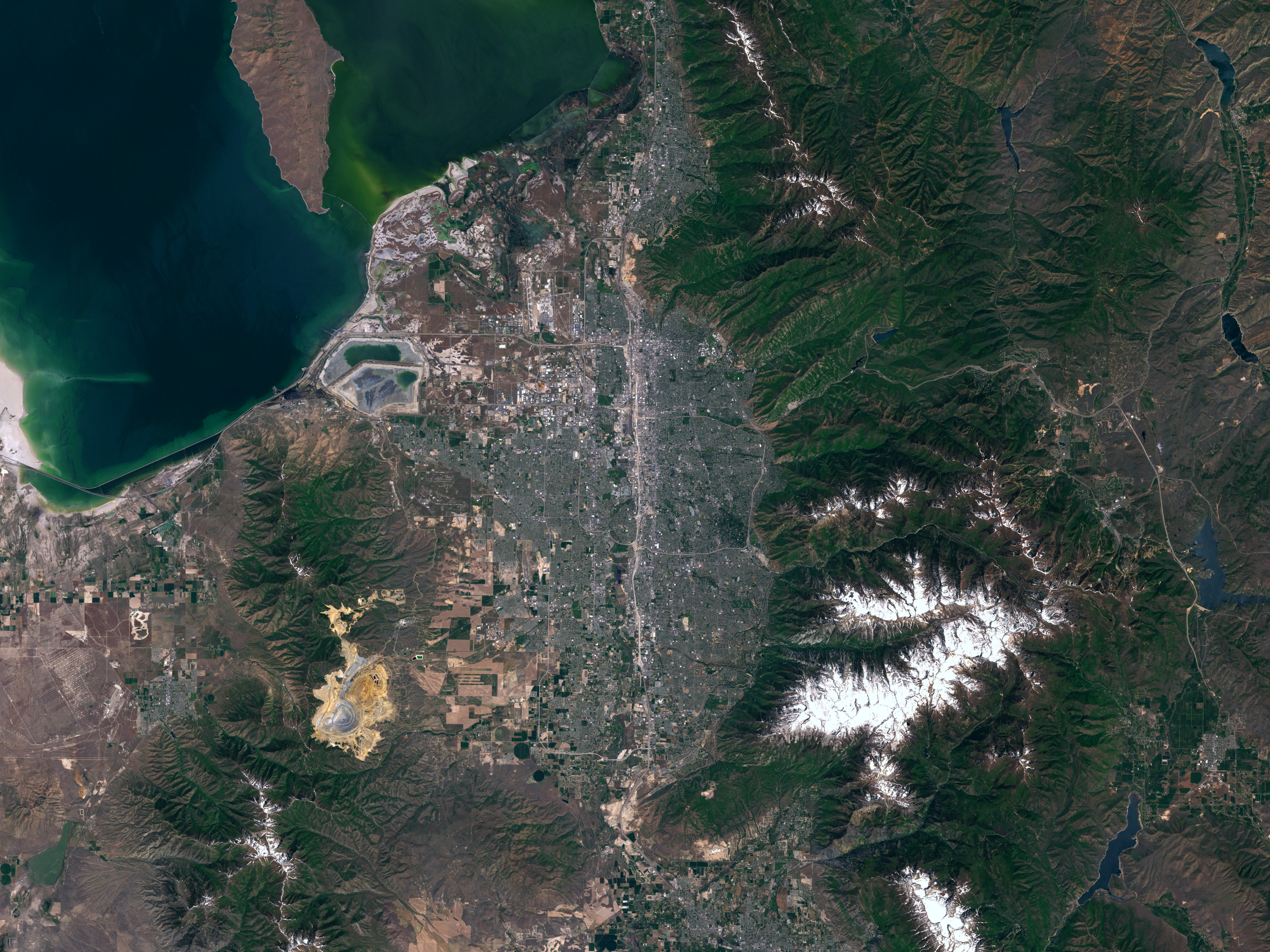
The Salt Lake Valley from space

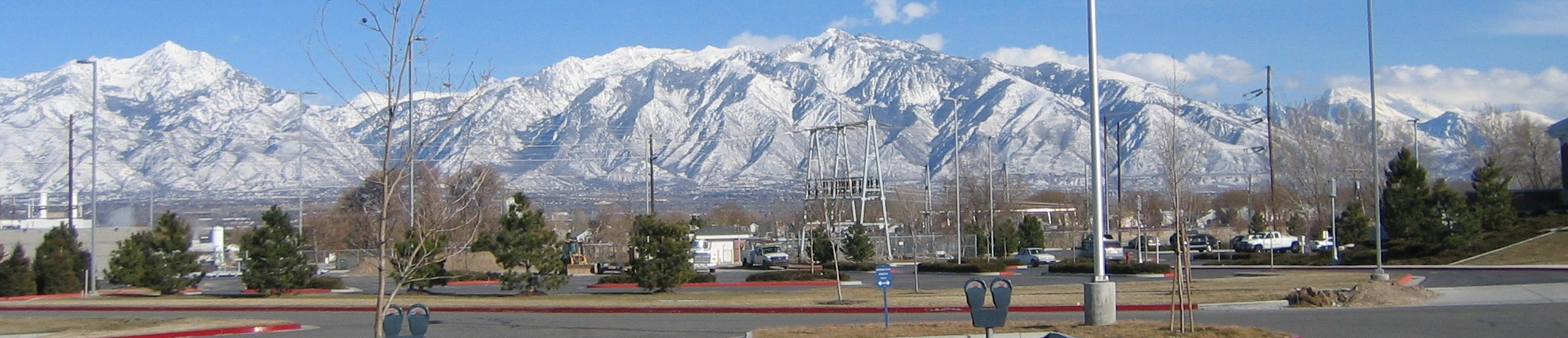
Greatest vertical relief in the valley. Twin Peaks has a rise of 7,099 ft (2,164 m) from the valley floor.

The Salt Lake Valley (also known as the Jordan Valley) is a 500-square-mile (1,300 km^{2}) valley in Salt Lake County in the north-central portion of the U.S. state of Utah. It contains Salt Lake City and many of its suburbs, notably Murray, Sandy, South Jordan, West Jordan, and West Valley City; its total population is 1,029,655 as of 2010.

Brigham Young said, "this is the right place," when he and his fellow Mormon settlers moved into Utah after being driven out of several states.

== Geography ==
The Valley is surrounded in every direction except the northwest by steep mountains that at some points rise 7,100 feet (2,200 m) from the valley floor's base elevation. It lies nearly encircled by the Wasatch Mountains on the east, the Oquirrh Mountains on the west, Traverse Ridge to the south and the Great Salt Lake on the northwest, with the peaks of Antelope Island visible.

Every entrance into the valley is extremely narrow and often congested. They include the Point of the Mountain to the south via the Jordan Narrows, a gap in the Traverse Mountains, narrow entrances between the Great Salt Lake and Oquirrh Mountains to the northwest and the Great Salt Lake and the Wasatch Mountains to the north, and several canyons to the east including Parley's Canyon and Emigration Canyon.

Flowing from Utah Lake in Utah Valley in the south, the Jordan River runs north through a gap in the Traverse Mountains, bisecting the Valley before emptying into the Great Salt Lake. The Jordan River, along with numerous mountain streams and reservoirs, provides irrigation water to the rapidly growing Valley.

The geography of the Salt Lake Valley combined with the prevalence of fossil-fuel-burning vehicles leads to poor air quality in Utah.

== Development ==
A company known as Kennecott Land, which owns the eastern foothills of the Oquirrhs in the western part of the valley, recently drafted a plan that would develop the rest of the entire valley within 75 years, adding at least 500,000 residents. The first development, known as the Daybreak Community, has substantial portions already completed but continues construction. It will focus on transit-oriented development (it already has service by TRAX light rail and will also feature a ski resort in the Oquirrh Mountains and a university campus).

Interstate 15 runs north to south through the middle-eastern portion of the Valley and Interstate 80 runs east to west in the northern quarter of the Valley from Parley's Canyon into Tooele County to the west (where it cuts across a small portion of the Great Salt Lake). The Interstate 215 belt route, State Route 154 (Bangerter Highway), State Route 201 (21st South Freeway), and State Route 85 (Mountain View Corridor) are also major transportation routes. The Utah Transit Authority operates an extensive bus system across the Wasatch Front, including the Salt Lake Valley, in addition to three light rail lines (known as TRAX) in the Valley. A commuter rail line known as FrontRunner runs north to Pleasant View in Weber County and south to Provo in Utah County.

== See also ==
- Mormon Trail
- Salt Lake County, Utah
