= Piute State Park =

State park in Utah, United States

- Location within Utah Location within the United States
- Interactive map of Piute State Park
- Location: Piute County, Utah, United States
- Coordinates: 38°19′5″N 112°11′52″W
- Area: 40 acres (16 ha)
- Elevation: 5,900 ft (1,800 m)
- Opened: 1963
- Operator: Utah State Parks
- Visitors: 1,839 (in 2025)
- Website: Official website
- Utah State Parks

Piute State Park is a Utah state park. It is located just north of Junction. This park is a primitive area; there are no facilities. Piute offers camping, swimming, boating, and fishing for rainbow, cutthroat, and brown trout.

== History ==
Robert D. Young, who also built the nearby Otter Creek dam, built Piute Reservoir on the main fork of the Sevier River in 1908. Both the reservoir and county are named for the Native Americans who dominated this area at one time. The state legislature changed the original spelling, from Paiute (the Native American people), to Piute.

== See also ==
- List of Utah State Parks
