= Edge of the Cedars State Park Museum =

State park in Utah, United States

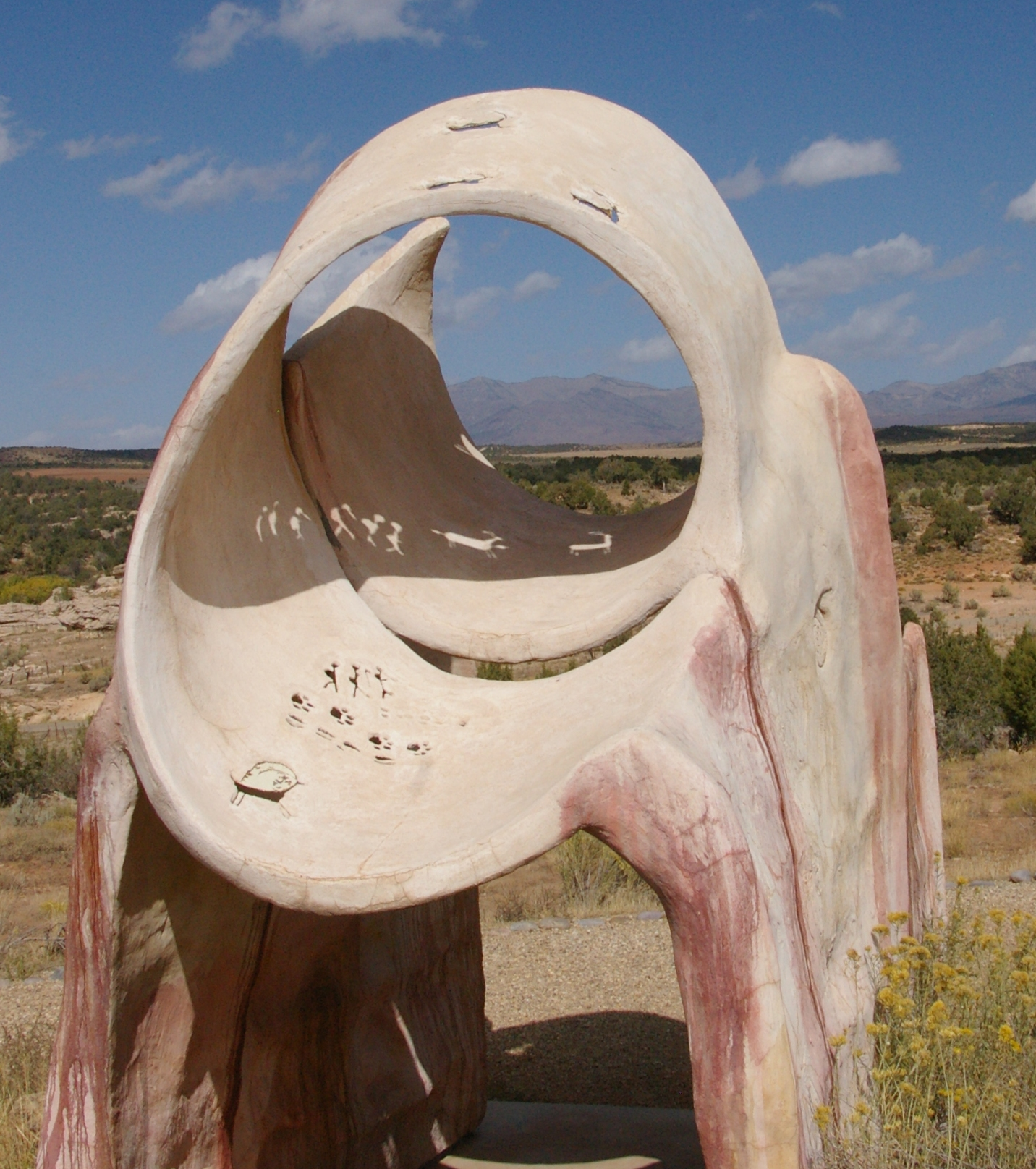
- Sculpture at the museum

- Location within Utah
- Location: San Juan County, Utah, United States
- Nearest city: Blanding
- Coordinates: 37°37′53″N 109°29′23″W
- Area: 6.65 acres (2.69 ha)
- Established: 1974
- Visitors: 13,776 (in 2022)
- Governing body: Utah State Park
- Edge of Cedars Indian Ruin
- U.S. National Register of Historic Places
- Location within Utah Location within the United States
- Area: 11.6 acres (4.7 ha)
- Website: Official website
- NRHP reference No.: 71000853
- Added to NRHP: August 12, 1971

Edge of the Cedars State Park Museum is a state park and museum of Utah, USA, located in Blanding. It is an Ancestral Puebloan archaeological site, a museum, and an archaeological repository. Cowboys from the nearby town of Bluff camped there in the late 19th century and called the site Edge of the Cedars because it sits on the edge of a natural boundary, separating a heavily forested region and a treeless landscape to the south. Cedar is a term locals use for the Utah juniper tree.

Because of its archaeological significance, the site was designated a State Historical Monument in 1970 and was listed on the National Register of Historic Places as the Edge of Cedars Indian Ruin in 1971. In 1974, the Utah Navajo Development Council donated the 6.65-acre (2.69 ha) site to the Division of Utah State Parks and Recreation. Shortly thereafter the Utah Legislature enabled the establishment of Edge of the Cedars State Park as a museum of Indian history and culture. The museum opened in 1978. The archaeological repository was completed in 1994. Today, the facility serves as the primary repository for archaeological materials excavated from public lands in southeast Utah, and includes archives and a research library.
