= Utah Field House of Natural History State Park Museum =

Museum and state park in Vernal, Utah, United States

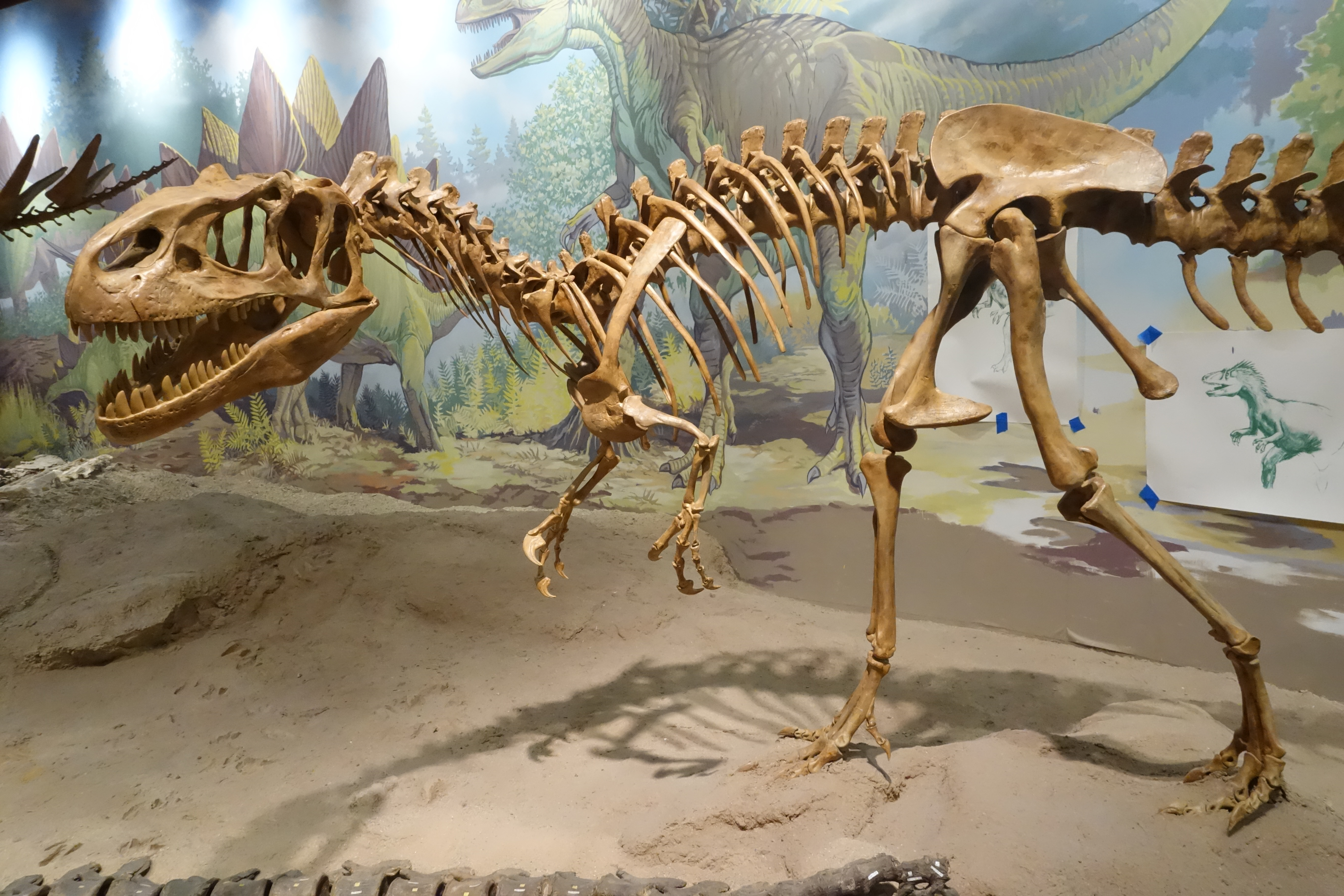
- Allosaurus skeletal reconstruction

- Location within Utah Location within the United States
- Interactive map of Utah Field House of Natural History State Park Museum
- Location: Vernal, Utah, United States
- Coordinates: 40°27′19″N 109°31′9″W
- Area: 2 acres (0.81 ha)
- Elevation: 5,300 ft (1,600 m)
- Opened: 1948 (museum); 1959 (state park)
- Administrator: Utah State Parks
- Visitors: 76,137 (in 2025)
- Website: Official website
- Utah State Parks

The Utah Field House of Natural History State Park Museum is a museum and state park in Vernal, Utah, United States. It consists of a 22,000-square-foot (2,000 m^{2}) structure on a 2-acre (0.81 ha) property. The museum displays prehistoric geological, anthropological, and natural history items found near the Uinta Mountains and within the Uinta Basin.

== Museum features ==
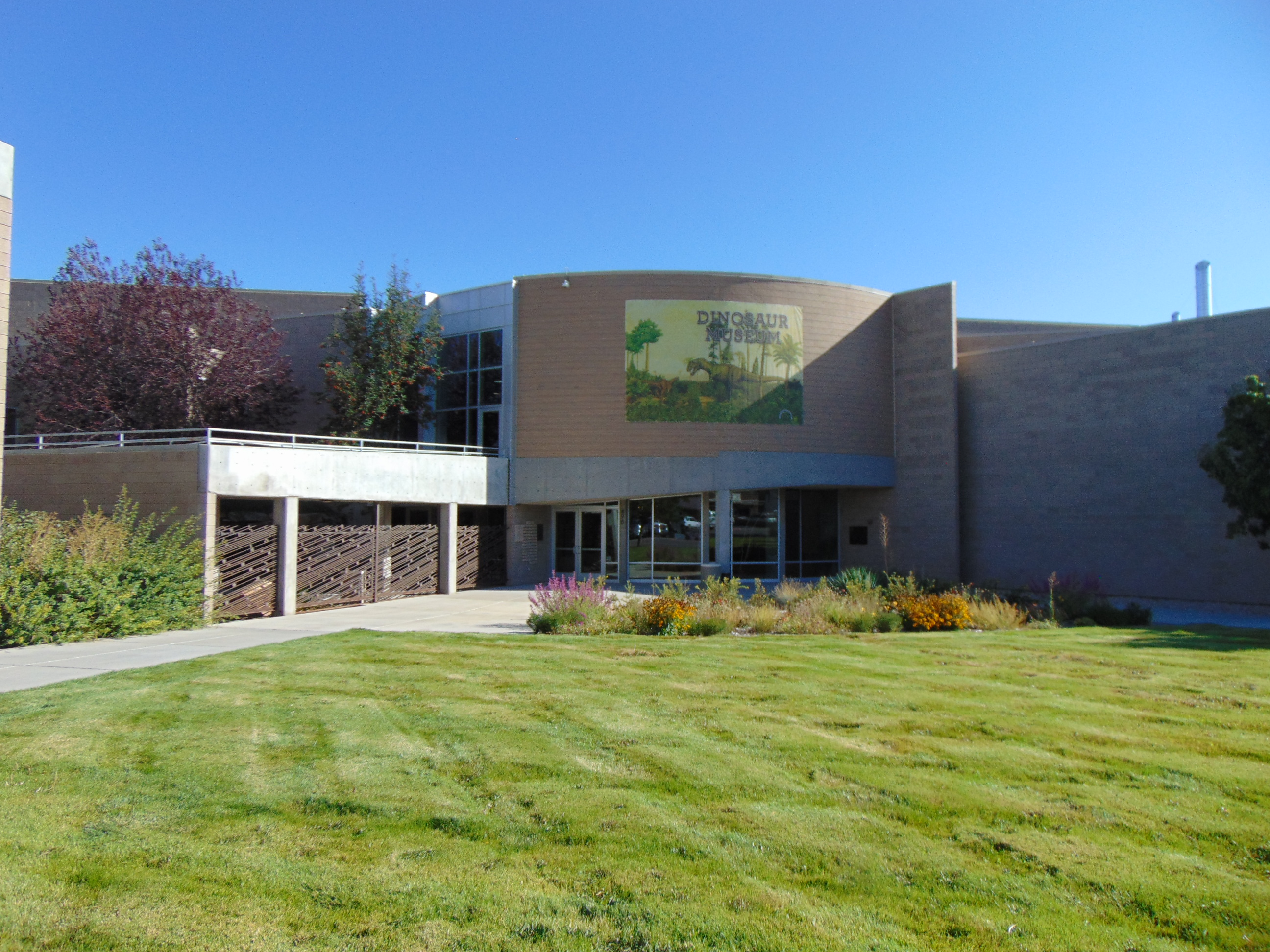
Front entrances to the Utah Field House of Natural History State Park Museum, September 2017

The Utah Field House of Natural History contains a rotunda, three exhibit halls, a classroom, a theater, and an outdoor garden.

The Geology Hall displays algae, dinosaur, and mammal fossils spanning more than 600 million years of history. There are also artistic representations of these life forms along with paintings of the geology of the region.

The Anthropology Hall features the human history of the area. This includes Fremont Indian artifacts along with reproductions of local petroglyphs. There are also more modern Ute handicrafts and other cultural items.

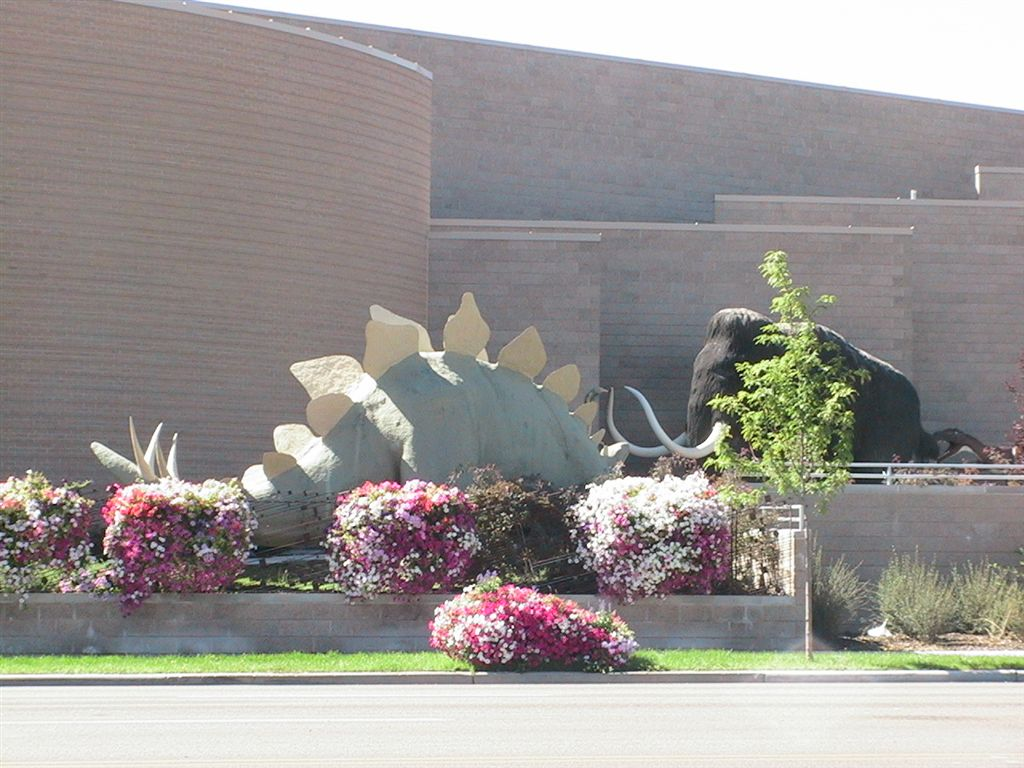
Museum exterior, August 2006

The Natural History Hall contains examples of animal life native to the area, arranged along a mural of the local environment spanning from the higher altitudes of the Uinta Mountains down to the lower Uinta Basin.

Outside the museum, the Dinosaur Garden features 17 full-sized prehistoric animal replicas from the Pennsylvanian through the Pleistocene epochs on the Geological time scale. Highlights include a twenty-foot Tyrannosaurus, a Stegosaurus, and two Moschops. The majority of these items were created by sculptor Elbert Porter, and were purchased in 1977 for the Field House. The newest addition, obtained by the museum in 1993, is a model of a Coelophysis made by artist David Thomas.

The park also has a picnic area.

== History ==
In 1945, the Utah State Legislature approved building a state-owned natural history museum in Vernal. This was a result of efforts by the local Lions Club and others. This museum was to house and display fossil remains of ancient life, along with other natural history items. Funding was made available in 1946, and the museum opened in 1948. Since that time, it has hosted millions of visitors.

== See also ==
- List of Utah State Parks
