= Green River State Park =

State park in Green River, Utah, United States

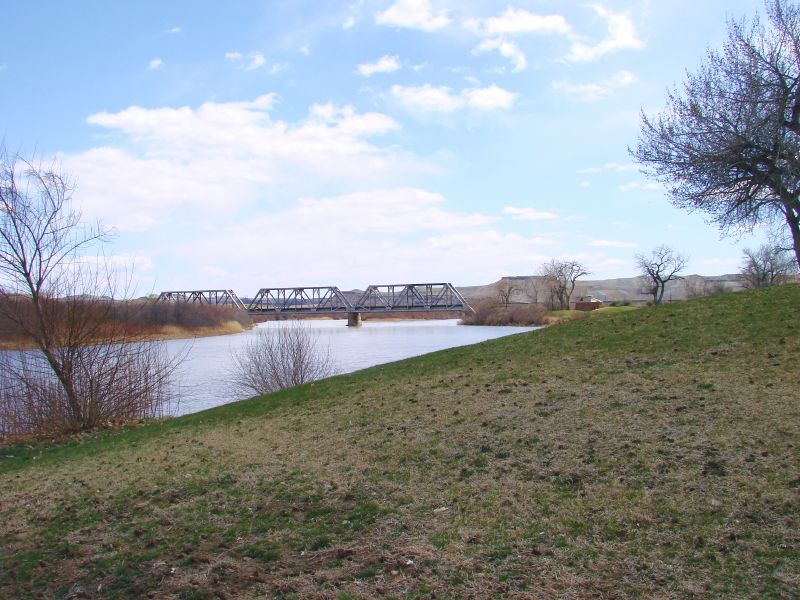

- Location within Utah Location within the United States
- Interactive map of Green River State Park
- Location: Emery County, Utah, United States
- Coordinates: 38°59′29″N 110°9′15″W
- Area: 53 acres (21 ha)
- Elevation: 4,050 ft (1,230 m)
- Opened: 1965
- Operator: Utah State Parks
- Visitors: 119,768 (in 2025)
- Website: Official website
- Utah State Parks

Green River State Park is a state park on the west shore of the Green River in Green River, Utah, United States.

== Description ==
The park consists of a nine-hole golf course, a campground shaded with cottonwood trees, and a boat ramp.

The Green River supports catfish, carp, and four unique endemic native fish that are threatened with extinction and protected: the Colorado pikeminnow, razorback sucker, humpback chub, and bonytail chub. While people are permitted to fish in the park, anglers are expected to release any of the unique fish.

Green River State Park is a popular embarkation point for float trips through the Green River's Labyrinth and Stillwater Canyons.

== Green River ==
The Green River, a tributary of the Colorado River, originates in Wyoming, where it flows 291 miles (468 km) before entering the state of Utah. It runs for 42 miles (68 km) in Colorado, and once journeying into Utah, runs another 397 miles (639 km). The confluence of the Green and Colorado Rivers is in Canyonlands National Park.

== See also ==
- List of Utah State Parks
