= Palisade State Park =

State park in Utah, United States

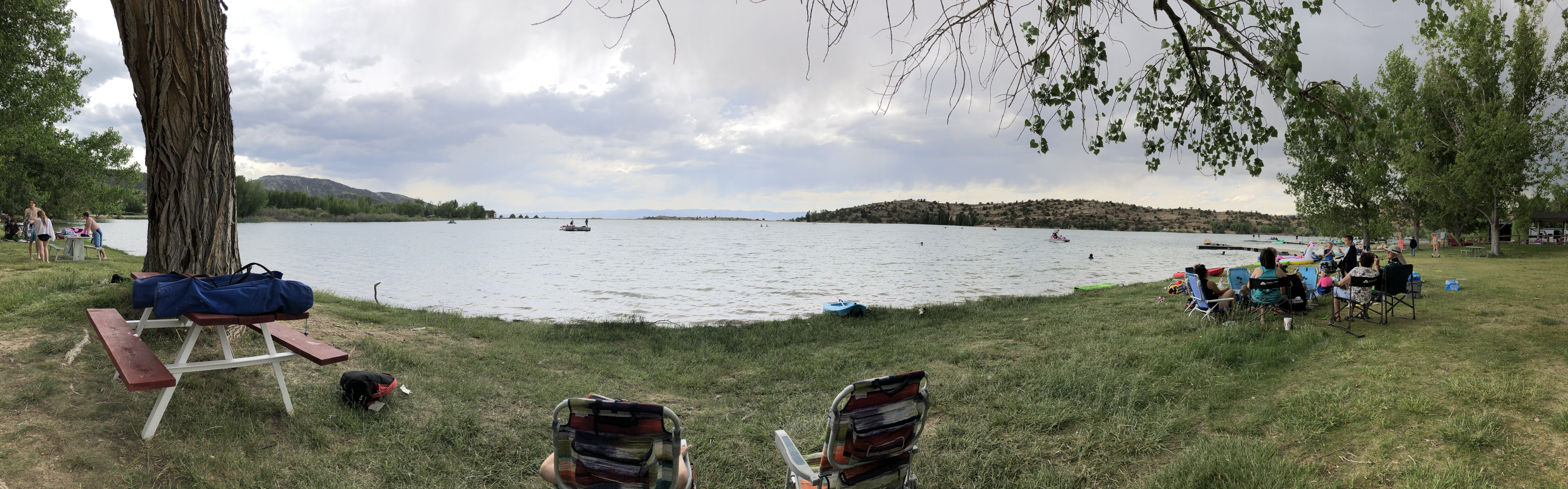

- Location within Utah Location within the United States
- Interactive map of Palisade State Park
- Location: Sanpete County, Utah, United States
- Coordinates: 39°12′23″N 111°39′56″W
- Area: 64 acres (26 ha)
- Elevation: 5,800 ft (1,800 m)
- Opened: 1962
- Operator: Utah State Parks
- Visitors: 307,259 (in 2025)
- Website: Official website
- Utah State Parks

Palisade State Park is a state park of Utah, United States, located just outside the small town of Sterling. The park offers tent, RV, and cabin camping, along with fishing, swimming, non-motorized (and electric motor) boating, golfing, and hiking. Off highway vehicle trails are also accessible from the park.

== History ==
In the 1860s, Daniel B. Funk, an early settler of the surrounding Sanpete Valley, had the idea of a summer and weekend resort area. At that time, the valley was owned by a small group of Sanpitch Indians led by Chief Arapeen. Daniel B. Funk bargained with the chief and obtained a land patent from the government. He and his family then set about the arduous task of building a dam and diverting part of Sixmile Creek to fill the lake. The lake quickly became a well-known pleasure resort, now called Palisade.

== See also ==
- List of Utah State Parks
