= Summit Stake Tabernacle =

- Formerly listed on the U.S. National Register of Historic Places
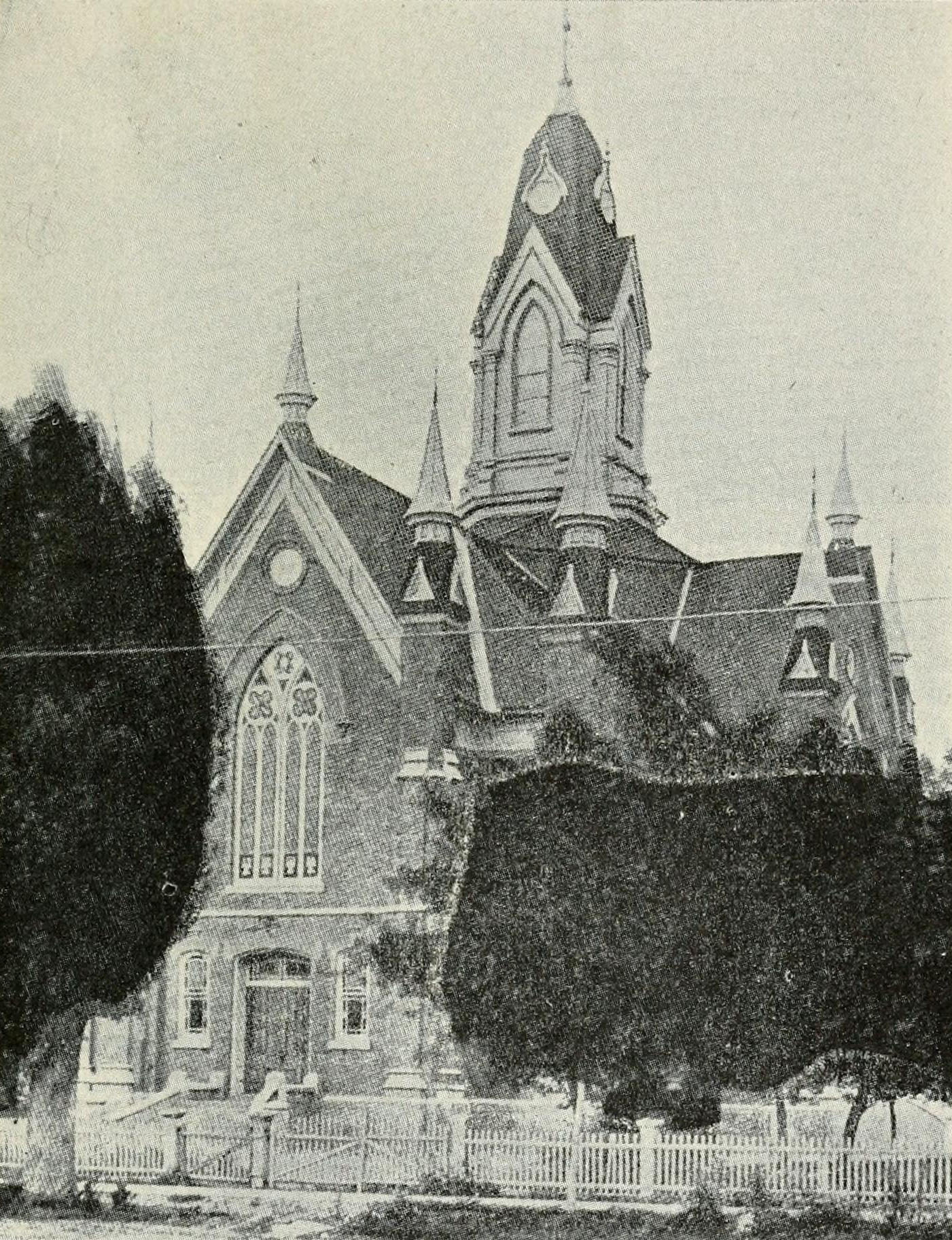
- Photo published in 1914.

- Location within Utah
- Location: Stood at 1st North and Main Sts. Coalville, Utah
- Coordinates: 40°55′2″N 111°23′56″W
- Built: 1899
- Architect: Thomas L. Allen
- Architectural style: Gothic
- NRHP reference No.: 71001078

Significant dates
- Added to NRHP: 1971
- Removed from NRHP: April 9, 1971

The Summit Stake Tabernacle or "Coalville Tabernacle" was a meetinghouse of the Church of Jesus Christ of Latter-day Saints (LDS Church) located in Coalville, Summit County, Utah.

== Construction ==
Plans for the Summit Stake Tabernacle were made shortly after the creation of the Summit Stake in 1877, and the architect and builder was Thomas L. Allen. The cornerstone was laid by Franklin D. Richards on August 7, 1879. The construction of the tabernacle included 600,000 locally made bricks, 75,000 feet of lumber (both Oregon red pine and local lumber from Echo Canyon), and sandstone from the Coalville ledge quarry. The unique gothic-style architecture included a 117-foot tower that was visible miles away. The interior had stained glass windows imported from Belgium and an elaborately painted ceiling. The tabernacle was dedicated on May 14, 1899 by LDS Church President Lorenzo Snow.

== Renovation ==
In the 1940s, renovations took place to alter the interior of the tabernacle into a more functional meetinghouse with classrooms. However, in a short time, even these alterations were deemed inadequate and a new stake center was planned.

== Demolition ==
After serving the Summit Stake and greater Coalville community for over 70 years, church administrators went through with plans to demolish the tabernacle. The building was listed on the Utah State Register of Historic Sites in 1970 and the National Register of Historic Places in 1971 shortly before demolition as attempts to preserve the building. There were other attempts to preserve the building, including a group of residents that tried to place a restraining order on the church, which garnered much media attention, including reports from the New York Times. However, two days after a judge struck down the restraining order, and amidst much controversy, church leaders removed some historically significant items from the tabernacle before bulldozers arrived. On March 5, 1971, the building was razed.

Allen Roberts reports that Milo Baughman, then the head of the Brigham Young University Department of Environmental Design, tried to organize a demonstration by students from the department against the demolition. The University blocked these plans, and soon closed the entire department.
