= Great Salt Lake State Park =

State park in Magna, Utah, United States

Great Salt Lake State Marina
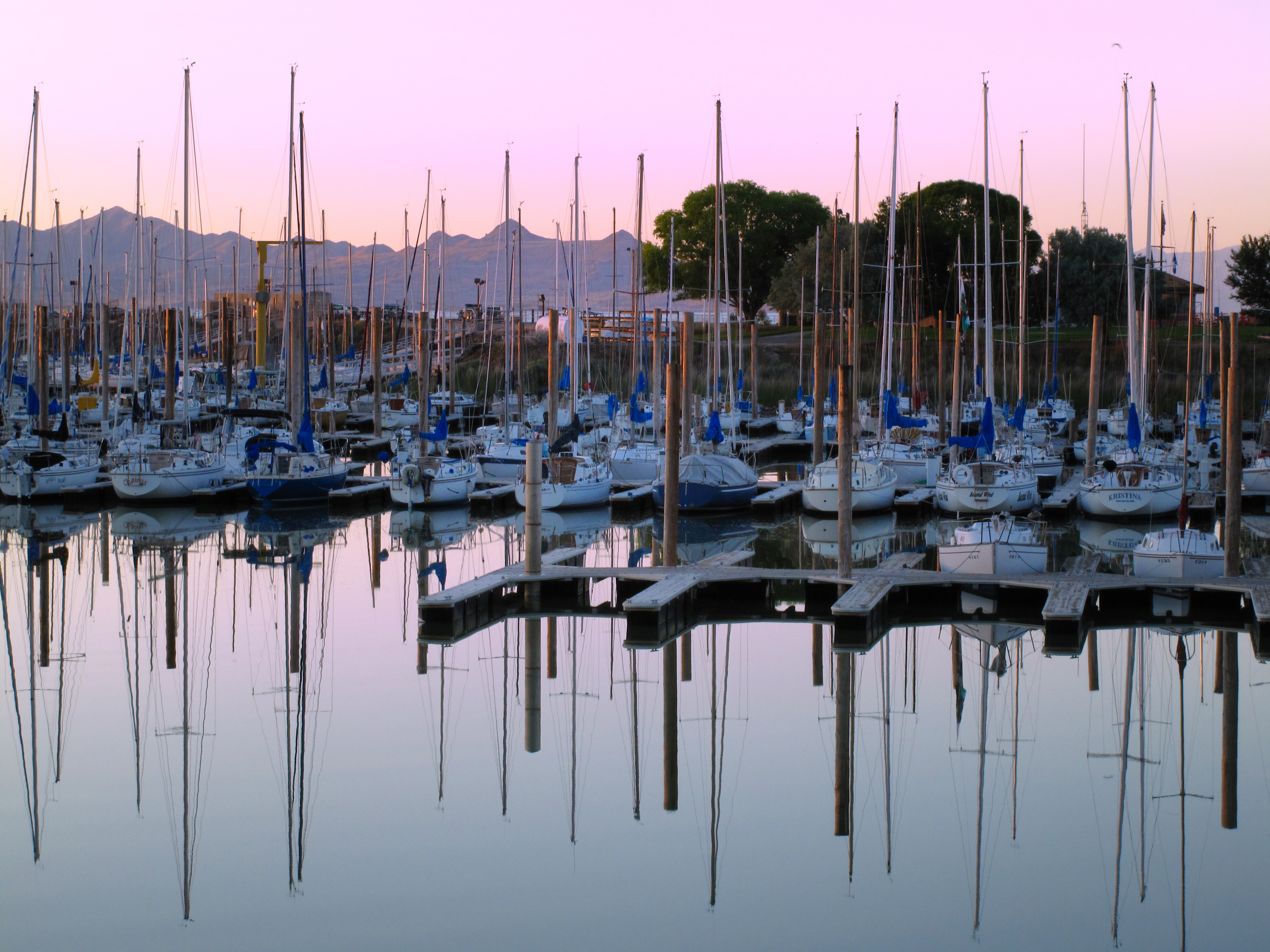

- Location within Utah Location within the United States
- Interactive map of Great Salt Lake State Marina
- Location: Magna, Utah, United States
- Coordinates: 40°44′01″N 112°12′36″W
- Elevation: 4,200 ft (1,300 m)
- Opened: 1978
- Operator: Utah State Parks
- Visitors: 320,950 (in 2025)
- Website: Official website
- Utah State Parks

The Great Salt Lake State Park is a state park on the south short of the Great Salt Lake in Magna, Utah, United States. It is home to the Great Salt Lake Yacht Club.

== History ==
The Great Salt Lake State Marina opened to the public as a state park in 1978, and the marina itself was expanded two years later.

== Geography ==
The park is located at an elevation of 4,200 feet (1,300 m), on the south shore of the Great Salt Lake, 16 miles (26 km) west of Salt Lake City.

== Park facilities ==
The park features a 300 slip marina along with a boat ramp, and is popular for swimming, and picnicking. There are restrooms and showers.

== See also ==
- List of Utah State Parks
