= Coalville, Utah =

City in the United States

- City
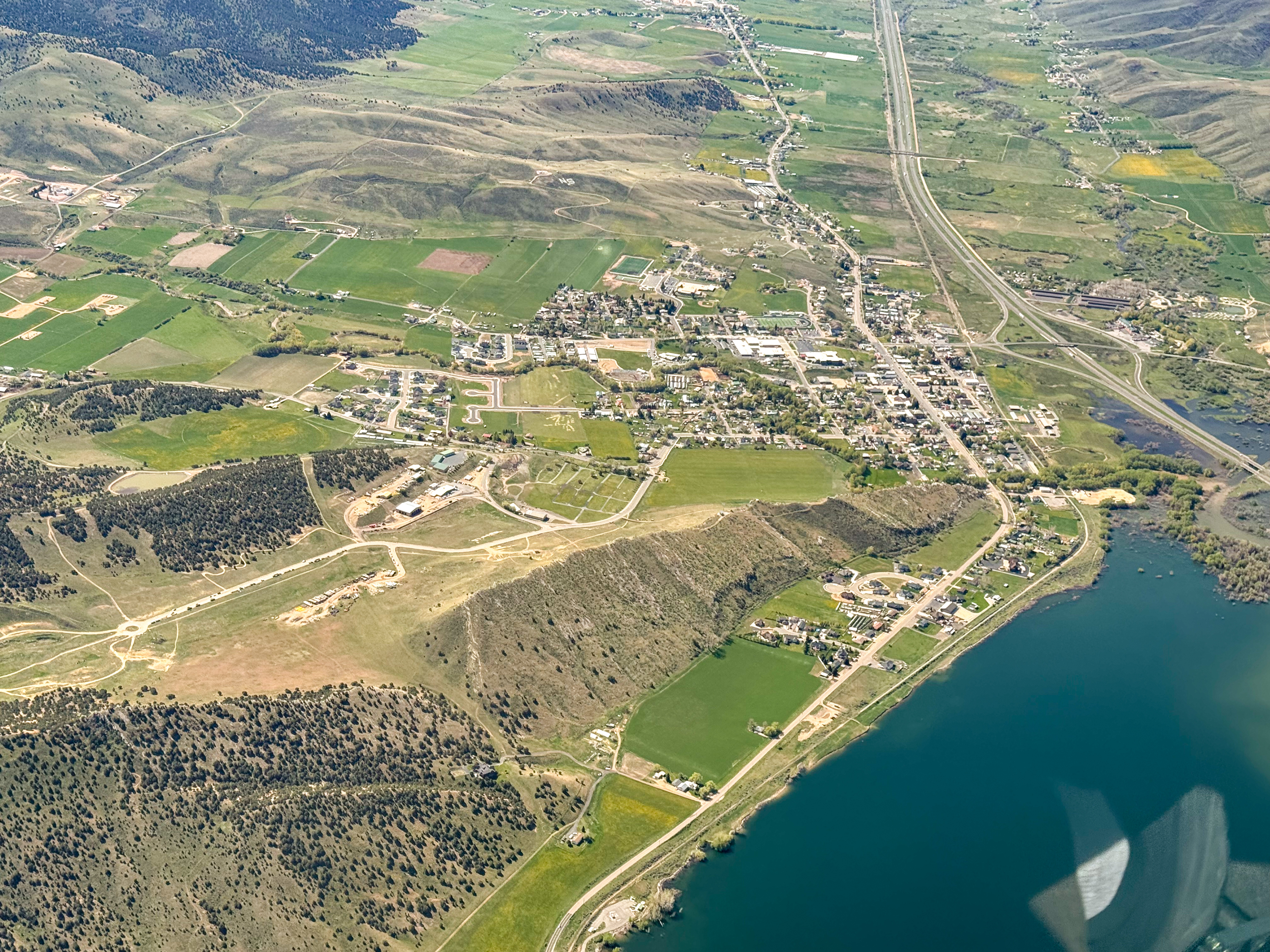

- Location in Summit County and the state of Utah
- Coordinates: 40°54′43″N 111°24′46″W
- Country: United States
- State: Utah
- County: Summit
- Settled by Return Jackson Redden: 1856
- Founded by William Henderson Smith: 1859
- Named for: Coal

Area
  - Total: 6.67 sq mi (17.27 km^{2})
  - Land: 6.22 sq mi (16.12 km^{2})
  - Water: 0.44 sq mi (1.15 km^{2})
- Elevation: 5,853 ft (1,784 m)

Population (2020)
  - Total: 1,486
  - Estimate (2022): 1,524
  - Density: 238.7/sq mi (92.18/km^{2})
- Time zone: UTC-7 (Mountain (MST))
  - Summer (DST): UTC-6 (MDT)
- ZIP code: 84017
- Area code: 435
- FIPS code: 49-14840
- GNIS feature ID: 2409496
- Website: www.coalvillecity.gov

Coalville is a city in and the county seat of Summit County, Utah, United States. It is part of the Salt Lake City metropolitan area. The population was 1,486 as of the 2020 census. Interstate 80 passes through the town, as well as the Weber River, which flows into Echo Reservoir, just north of Coalville.

== History ==
Coalville circa 1879

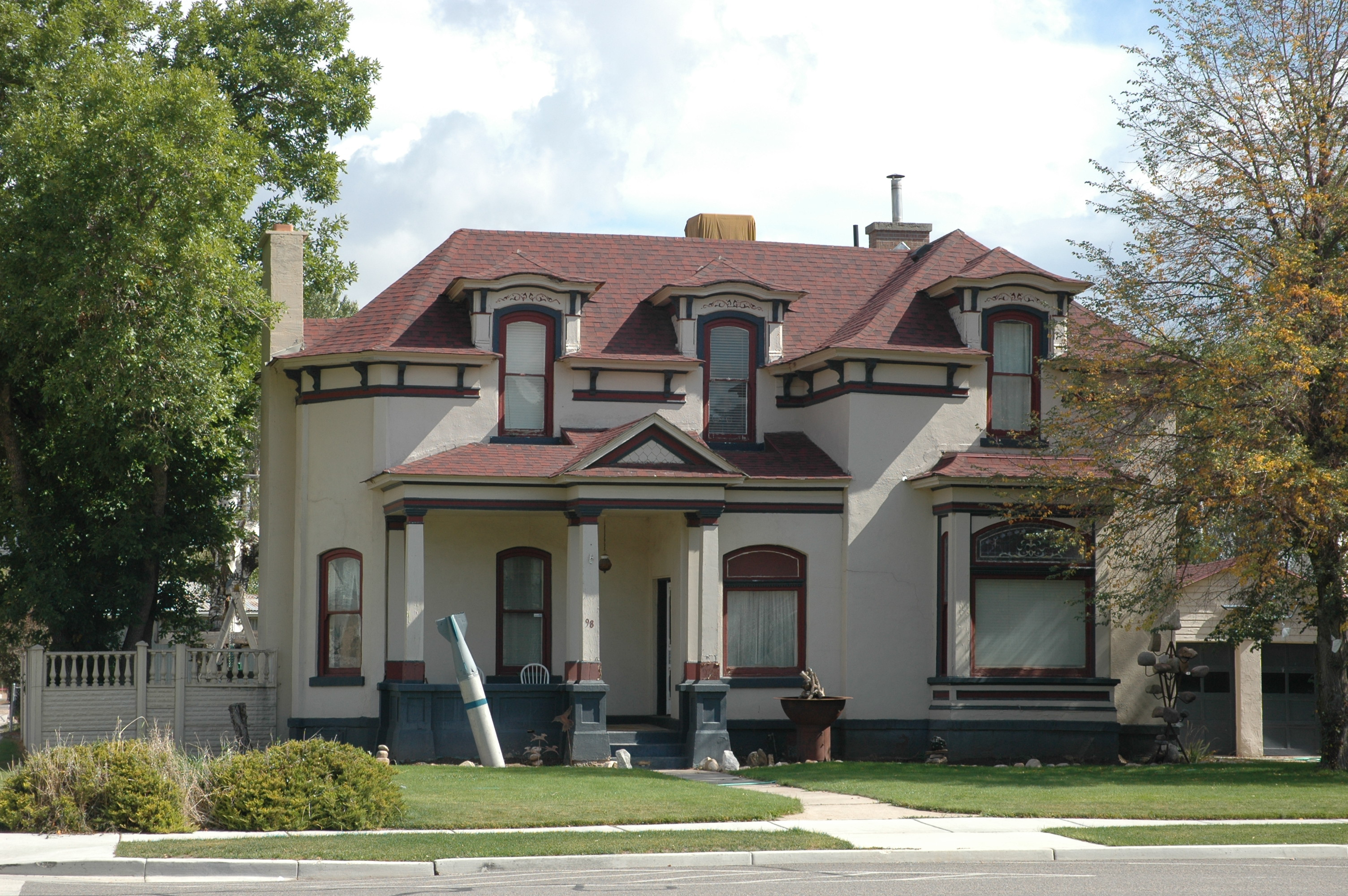
Thomas L. Allen House

Coalville originally began as a settlement known as Chalk Creek. In 1856 Brigham Young, president of the Church of Jesus Christ of Latter-day Saints (LDS Church), awarded hundreds of acres of farmland to trailblazer and trusted bodyguard "Return" Jackson Redden. Redden first visited the valley around 1846 while scouting trail ahead of the advance of Mormon pioneers. The first recorded settlement was Redden's ranch, spanning from 100 N. Main Street to beyond the Coalville City Cemetery where he is buried. In 1854, the territorial government in Utah offered a $1000 reward to anyone who could find coal within 40 miles of Salt Lake City. Four years later, Redden and associate Thomas Rhodes found a coal vein in the Chalk Creek area, and coal mining began in earnest. Hundreds of tons of coal were shipped to Salt Lake City, and soon a narrow gauge railroad was built. The settlement was then renamed Coalville, as a result of this early success.

Coalville was officially founded by William Henderson Smith, an early Mormon freighter. He noticed that wheat, spilled by other wagons moving through the area, would grow to maturity without being tended. In 1859, he signed Coalville into official township.

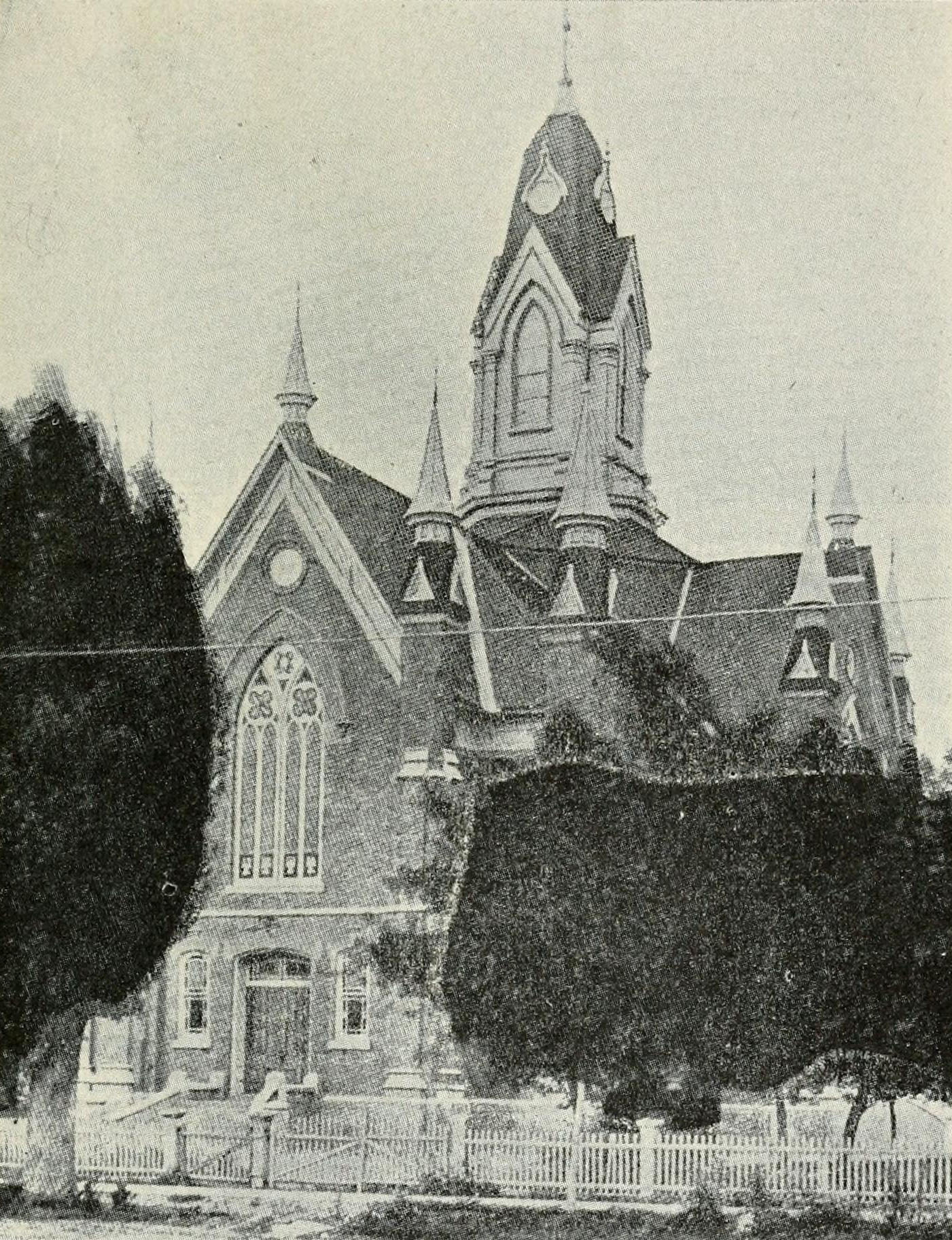
Summit Stake Tabernacle

Early life in Coalville was difficult, and during winters, the settlers dealt with a constant scarcity of food. When food ran out, they would travel to Salt Lake City for supplies. The local Indian tribes were also hostile for a time, and the settlers built a fort on the advice of Brigham Young. In 1867, Coalville was incorporated.

By 1880, success in the coal industry led to the extension of the railroad into Park City. Then known as the Summit County Railway, the railroad continued to transport coal and was also used for Park City's silver mines.

Unlike most Mormon settlements in Utah and the intermountain west, Coalville city streets are not aligned to the true north. Main Street in Coalville is offset such that it runs slightly north-northwest, and Center street runs slightly east-northeast. Both the Thomas L. Allen House and the Summit Stake Tabernacle in Coalville are listed on the National Register of Historic Places.

== Geography and climate ==
According to the United States Census Bureau, the city has a total area of 3.3 square miles (8.5 km^{2}), of which 2.9 square miles (7.5 km^{2}) is land and 0.4 square miles (1.0 km^{2}) (12.27%) is water.

Coalville has a high-altitude, warm-summer humid continental climate (Köppen Dfb) that borders a subarctic climate (Dfc), characterized by extreme diurnal temperature ranges that range from extremely cold winter nights to hot afternoons in the summer. However, the high altitude and low humidity mean that mornings in the summer remain very cool, and frosts have occasionally occurred—even in July. Precipitation is moderate throughout the year, though with a minimum in summer, and snow accumulation is generally heavy due to the very cold nights between November and March, with a median of 60.1 inches (1.53 m) for the year.

Coalville is located at the intersection of two narrow valleys—formed by Chalk Creek and the Weber River. Like other valley locations in northern Utah, Coalville experiences pronounced temperature inversions associated with high-pressure systems during winter months, with low temperatures below 0 °F relatively common. Owing to this localized phenomenon, observed low temperatures are often significantly lower than those forecasted by national agencies.

Climate data for Coalville 13 E, Utah, 1991–2020 normals, 1996-2016 precip/snowfall: 6510ft (1984m)
| Month | Jan | Feb | Mar | Apr | May | Jun | Jul | Aug | Sep | Oct | Nov | Dec | Year |
|---|---|---|---|---|---|---|---|---|---|---|---|---|---|
| Record high °F (°C) | 56 (13) | 60 (16) | 74 (23) | 79 (26) | 88 (31) | 92 (33) | 98 (37) | 95 (35) | 87 (31) | 82 (28) | 73 (23) | 61 (16) | 98 (37) |
| Mean maximum °F (°C) | 49 (9) | 51 (11) | 62 (17) | 70 (21) | 78 (26) | 85 (29) | 90 (32) | 87 (31) | 83 (28) | 75 (24) | 64 (18) | 52 (11) | 87 (31) |
| Mean daily maximum °F (°C) | 32.3 (0.2) | 34.8 (1.6) | 43.4 (6.3) | 49.8 (9.9) | 59.5 (15.3) | 69.6 (20.9) | 78.4 (25.8) | 76.5 (24.7) | 68.0 (20.0) | 55.7 (13.2) | 42.0 (5.6) | 32.8 (0.4) | 53.6 (12.0) |
| Daily mean °F (°C) | 18.5 (−7.5) | 20.9 (−6.2) | 30.0 (−1.1) | 36.4 (2.4) | 44.9 (7.2) | 52.3 (11.3) | 59.7 (15.4) | 58.5 (14.7) | 50.4 (10.2) | 39.5 (4.2) | 27.7 (−2.4) | 18.7 (−7.4) | 38.1 (3.4) |
| Mean daily minimum °F (°C) | 4.8 (−15.1) | 7.0 (−13.9) | 16.5 (−8.6) | 22.9 (−5.1) | 30.3 (−0.9) | 34.9 (1.6) | 41.1 (5.1) | 40.4 (4.7) | 32.8 (0.4) | 23.2 (−4.9) | 13.4 (−10.3) | 4.7 (−15.2) | 22.7 (−5.2) |
| Mean minimum °F (°C) | −14 (−26) | −13 (−25) | −1 (−18) | 8 (−13) | 19 (−7) | 27 (−3) | 35 (2) | 33 (1) | 23 (−5) | 13 (−11) | −5 (−21) | −14 (−26) | −19 (−28) |
| Record low °F (°C) | −34 (−37) | −25 (−32) | −18 (−28) | −6 (−21) | 12 (−11) | 19 (−7) | 27 (−3) | 26 (−3) | 15 (−9) | 7 (−14) | −19 (−28) | −29 (−34) | −34 (−37) |
| Average precipitation inches (mm) | 1.15 (29) | 0.92 (23) | 1.04 (26) | 1.77 (45) | 1.76 (45) | 0.98 (25) | 0.76 (19) | 0.78 (20) | 1.33 (34) | 1.15 (29) | 1.24 (31) | 1.25 (32) | 14.13 (358) |
| Average snowfall inches (cm) | 17.6 (45) | 15.2 (39) | 14.8 (38) | 9.0 (23) | 2.9 (7.4) | 0.6 (1.5) | trace | trace | 0.8 (2.0) | 3.1 (7.9) | 12.9 (33) | 18.8 (48) | 95.7 (244.8) |
Source 1: NOAA
Source 2: XMACIS2 (precip/snow, records & monthly max/mins)

== Demographics ==
Historical population
| Census | Pop. | Note | %± |
|---|---|---|---|
| 1870 | 626 | | — |
| 1880 | 911 | | 45.5% |
| 1890 | 1,166 | | 28.0% |
| 1900 | 808 | | −30.7% |
| 1910 | 976 | | 20.8% |
| 1920 | 771 | | −21.0% |
| 1930 | 938 | | 21.7% |
| 1940 | 949 | | 1.2% |
| 1950 | 850 | | −10.4% |
| 1960 | 907 | | 6.7% |
| 1970 | 864 | | −4.7% |
| 1980 | 1,031 | | 19.3% |
| 1990 | 1,065 | | 3.3% |
| 2000 | 1,382 | | 29.8% |
| 2010 | 1,363 | | −1.4% |
| 2020 | 1,486 | | 9.0% |
| 2022 (est.) | 1,524 | | 2.6% |
U.S. Decennial Census

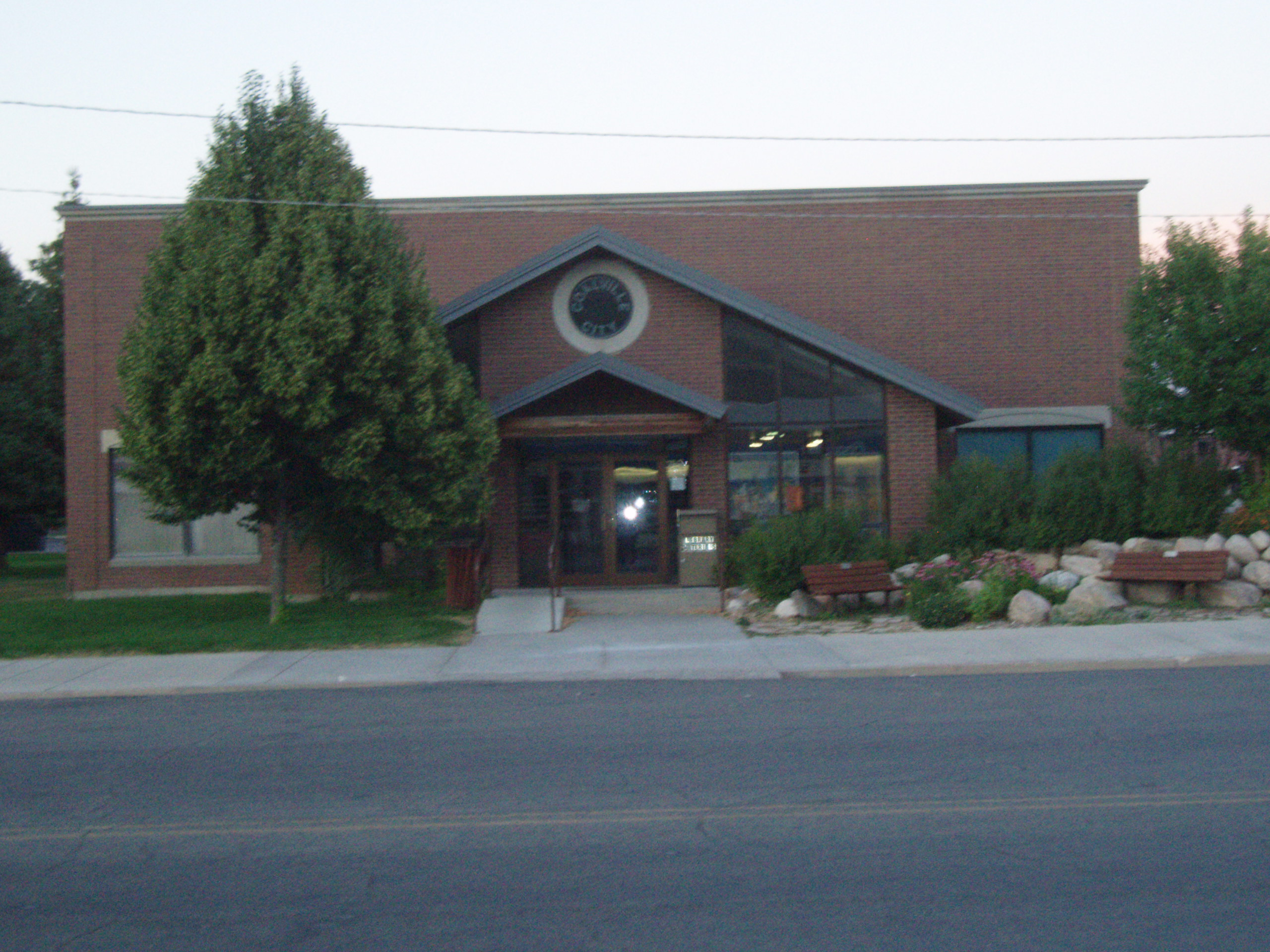
Coalville City Hall

=== 2020 census ===
As of the 2020 census, Coalville had a population of 1,486. The median age was 33.9 years. 28.2% of residents were under the age of 18 and 12.0% of residents were 65 years of age or older. For every 100 females there were 99.7 males, and for every 100 females age 18 and over there were 99.4 males age 18 and over.

0.0% of residents lived in urban areas, while 100.0% lived in rural areas.

There were 506 households in Coalville, of which 39.7% had children under the age of 18 living in them. Of all households, 62.5% were married-couple households, 14.6% were households with a male householder and no spouse or partner present, and 17.6% were households with a female householder and no spouse or partner present. About 14.6% of all households were made up of individuals and 6.4% had someone living alone who was 65 years of age or older.

There were 583 housing units, of which 13.2% were vacant. The homeowner vacancy rate was 1.3% and the rental vacancy rate was 5.5%.

Racial composition as of the 2020 census
| Race | Number | Percent |
|---|---|---|
| White | 1,136 | 76.4% |
| Black or African American | 2 | 0.1% |
| American Indian and Alaska Native | 13 | 0.9% |
| Asian | 7 | 0.5% |
| Native Hawaiian and Other Pacific Islander | 1 | 0.1% |
| Some other race | 222 | 14.9% |
| Two or more races | 105 | 7.1% |
| Hispanic or Latino (of any race) | 352 | 23.7% |

=== 2000 census ===
As of the 2000 census, there were 1,382 people, 465 households, and 371 families residing in the city. The population density was 483.9 people per square mile (186.8/km^{2}). There were 495 housing units at an average density of 173.3 per square mile (66.9/km^{2}). The racial makeup of the city was 93.13% White, 0.07% African American, 0.80% Native American, 0.29% Asian, 0.07% Pacific Islander, 4.92% from other races, and 0.72% from two or more races. Hispanic or Latino of any race were 6.87% of the population.

There were 465 households, out of which 47.3% had children under the age of 18 living with them, 68.6% were married couples living together, 8.0% had a female householder with no husband present, and 20.2% were non-families. 18.3% of all households were made up of individuals, and 10.3% had someone living alone who was 65 years of age or older. The average household size was 2.97, and the average family size was 3.41.

In the city, the population was spread out, with 33.8% under 18, 10.7% from 18 to 24, 28.9% from 25 to 44, 15.7% from 45 to 64, and 10.9% who were 65 years of age or older. The median age was 28 years. For every 100 females, there were 104.7 males. For every 100 females aged 18 and over, there were 103.3 males.

The median income for a household in the city was $39,342, and the median income for a family was $43,929. Males had a median income of $32,727 versus $20,833 for females. The per capita income for the city was $17,830. About 5.9% of families and 8.0% of the population were below the poverty line, (over 40% of students receive reduced or free lunch) including 11.9% of those under age 18 and 6.2% of those aged 65 or over.

== Education ==
It is in the North Summit School District. The district consists of North Summit High School, Middle School, and Elementary School. North Summit High School's mascot is the Brave, and the school colors are purple and gold. The school mascot was chosen because of the Western Shoshone tribes that once lived in the area.

== Economy ==
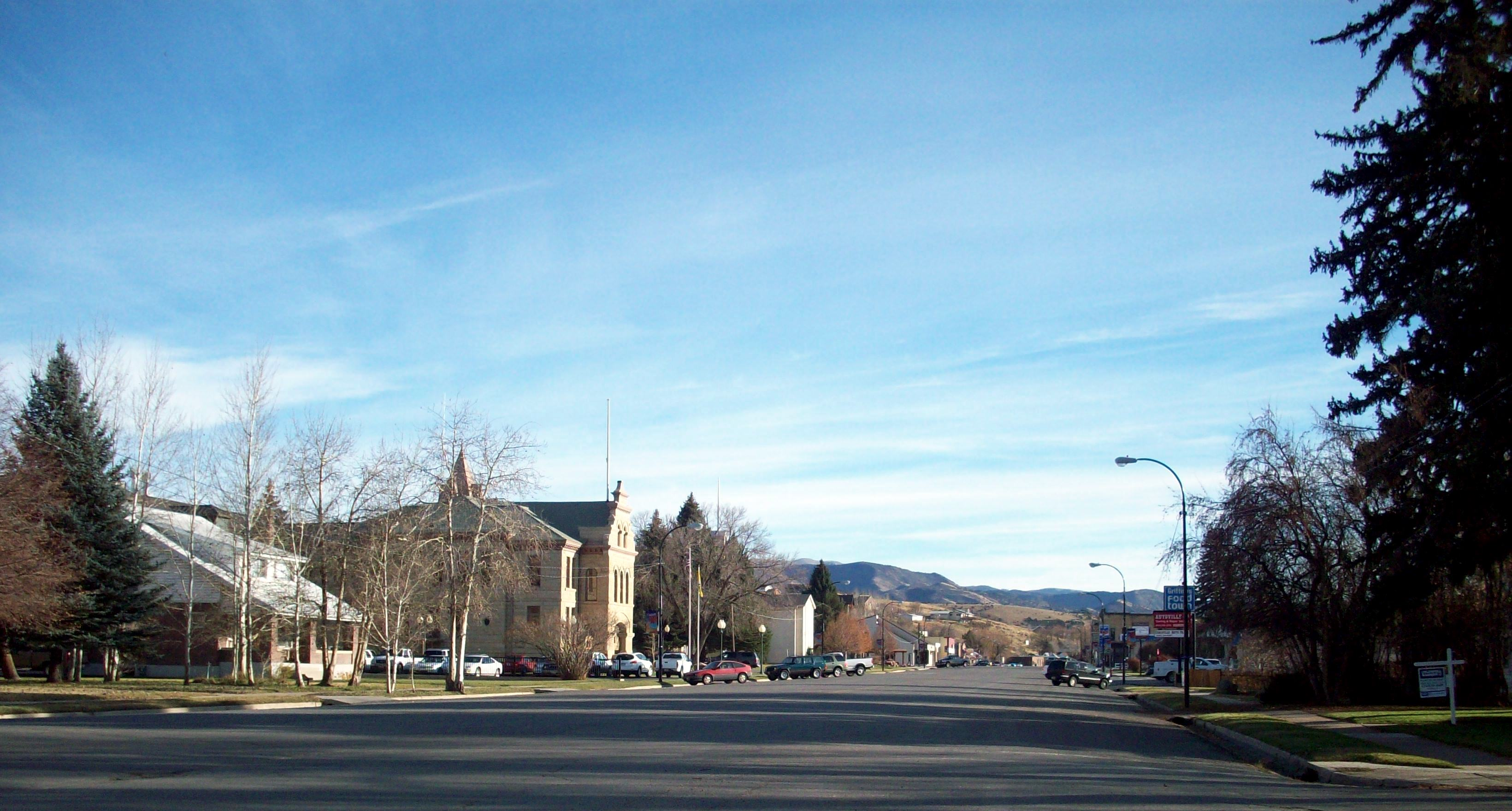
Main Street in Coalville

Some residents of the Coalville area pursue careers in farming, ranching, construction, public education, and county government—though many commute to the Wasatch Front. Ranchers in the area primarily raise beef and dairy cows, sheep, and mink. Crops such as alfalfa and wheat are also cultivated.

There is a small grocery store, a few restaurants, two motels, and several small gas/convenience stores. A health clinic serves residents of Coalville and other settlements in northern Summit County, as well as a dental office. Vacant commercial real estate continues to be a problem, especially along the main street, as is the case in many small towns in rural America—an effect of urbanization.

== See also ==
- List of cities and towns in Utah
- Anthony Geary
- Brant Boyer
- Interstate 80
- List of Registered Historic Places in Utah: Summit County
- U.S. Route 530
