= Echo Dam =

Reservoir in the state of Utah, United States

Coordinates: 40°57′58″N 111°25′49″W

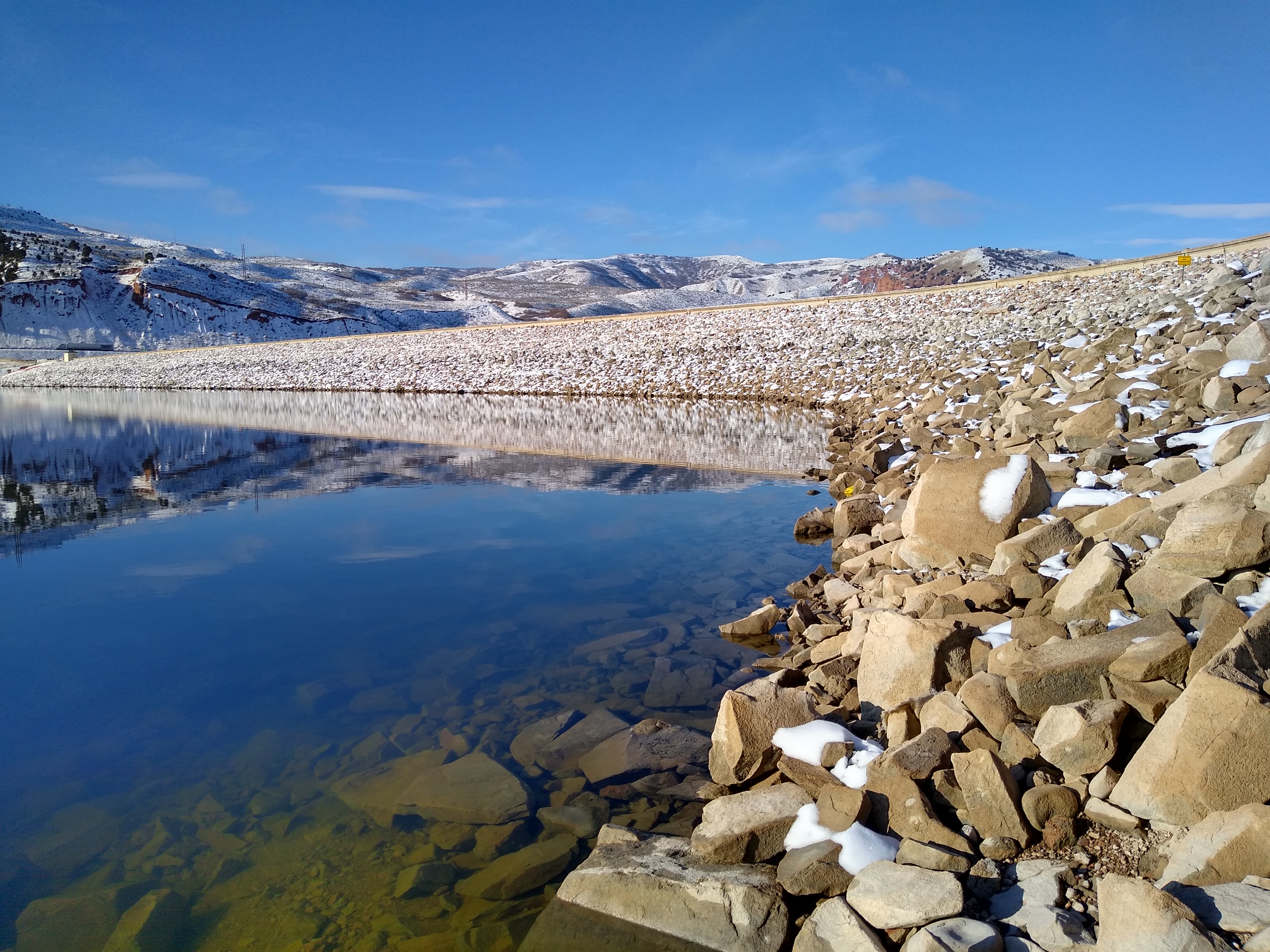
This is a photo of the Echo Reservoir Dam, taken from near the northwest corner of the dam, down at the water's edge

Echo Dam is a dam in Summit County, Utah, standing about six miles (10 km) north of Coalville and creating Echo Reservoir.

The earthen dam was constructed in 1931 by the United States Bureau of Reclamation. It has a height of 158 feet (48 m), impounding the water of the Weber River and 836 square miles of the Weber Basin for water storage and agricultural irrigation. Other Weber Basin projects of the Bureau include the upstream Rockport Reservoir. Echo Dam is owned by the Bureau and operated by the local Weber River Water Users Association. In July 2012, crews began a $50 million seismic retrofit project on the dam to address potentially unstable subsoil conditions.

Echo Reservoir has a capacity of 74,000 acre-feet (91 million cubic metres). As a recreation area the reservoir offers fishing, boating, camping, and hiking.
