= Utah State Route 130 =

State highway in Utah, United States

State Route 130

Route information
- Maintained by UDOT
- Length: 43.154 mi (69.450 km)
- Existed: 1933–present

Major junctions
- South end: I-15 in Cedar City
- SR-14 / SR-289 in Cedar City; SR-56 in Cedar City; I-15 in Cedar City
- North end: SR-21 in Minersville

Location
- Country: United States
- State: Utah
- Counties: Iron and Beaver

Highway system
- Utah State Highway System; Interstate; US; State; Minor; Scenic
← SR-129	→ SR-131

State Route 130 (SR-130) is a state highway in the U.S. state of Utah. Spanning 43 miles (69 km), it connects the town of Minersville in Beaver County with the cities of Cedar City, Enoch, and Parowan to the south in Iron County.

== Route description ==
SR-130 begins at the south Cedar City interchange with Interstate 15 (I-15). Following Main Street through the city, it starts to the northeast before turning north through the center of the city. As the highway reaches the north end of the city, it meets I-15 in another interchange, continuing north through Enoch as the Minersville Highway. After leaving Enoch, (at the northern end of Cedar Valley), the highway continues north through sparsely populated areas, intersecting Gap Road, an extension of the old Lund Highway about 12 miles (19 km) north of Enoch. Gap Road connects to Parowan, and is named for the pass it traverses, Parowan Gap, site of ancient petroglyphs, evidence that it was on a major thoroughfare of early Native Americans. SR-130 continues in a generally north-northwest direction through the Black Mountains, entering Beaver County and arriving in Minersville, ending at its intersection with SR-21.

The southernmost sections of SR-130, from the southern terminus at I-15 to 4800 North in Enoch, are part of the National Highway System.

== History ==
State Route 130 was originally established in 1933 as the Minersville Loop on SR-21. In 1953, one of the legs of the loop was deleted, turning the highway into a short 0.4 miles (0.64 km) spur connecting SR-21 to the center of Minersville. In 1965, this short spur was significantly extended south, now passing through Minersville, and continuing all the way down through Enoch to U.S. Route 91 just north of Cedar City, bringing its total length to about 37 miles (60 km). With the construction of Interstate 15 in the area, the route was extended southward again in 1967. This extension took it south through Cedar City on the former alignment of State Route 1 (US-91) along Main Street to the south Cedar City interchange, a distance of about 6 miles (9.7 km), while State Route 1 was realigned to the west to coincide with Interstate 15.

== Major intersections ==
County	Location	mi	km	Destinations	Notes
Iron	Cedar City	0.000	0.000	Royal Hunte Drive	Southern terminus
Iron	Cedar City	0.075– 0.208	0.121– 0.335	I-15 – St. George, Las Vegas, Salt Lake City	I-15 exit 57
Iron	Cedar City	0.305	0.491	Old Highway 91 south	Former US-91
Iron	Cedar City	2.331	3.751	SR-14 east (Center Street) / University Boulevard west – Southern Utah University	Western terminus of SR-14; eastern terminus of University Boulevard
Iron	Cedar City	2.579	4.150	SR-56 west (Freedom Boulevard) – Newcastle, Enterprise, Modena, Cedar City Airport	Eastern terminus of SR-56
Iron	Cedar City	6.149– 6.334	9.896– 10.194	I-15 – St. George, Las Vegas, Salt Lake City	I-15 exit 62
Iron	Enoch	8.835	14.219	Midvalley Road	Former SR-199
Iron		19.484	31.356	Gap Road	Former SR-127
Beaver		43.154	69.450	SR-21 – Milford, Beaver	Northern terminus
1.000 mi = 1.609 km; 1.000 km = 0.621 mi
