= Diamond Valley (Washington County, Utah) =

Basin in Washington County, Utah, United States

Coordinates: 37.254°N 113.621°W

Diamond Valley is a valley in northern Washington County, Utah, United States, that is located about 3 miles (4.8 km) north of the northern limits of St. George on Utah State Route 18, just past the entrance to Snow Canyon State Park at an elevation of approximately 4,500 ft (1,400 m), 1,800 ft (550 m) higher than the neighboring metropolis of St George. The unincorporated community of Diamond Valley is located within the valley, as is the Santa Clara Volcano.

== See also ==
- List of valleys of Utah
