= Utah State Route 8 (disambiguation) =

State Route 8

Location
- Country: United States
- State: Utah

Highway system
- Utah State Highway System; Interstate; US; State; Minor; Scenic
← SR-7	→ SR-9

Utah State Route 8 may refer to:

- Utah State Route 8, a current state highway in northeastern St. George, Utah, United States that runs east along Sunset Boulevard from Dixie Downs Road/Dixie Drive to Bluff Street (SR‑18)
- Utah State Route 8 (1910–1977), former legislative overlay state highway in Utah, United States that had an extension added in 1963 and a substantial alignment truncation in 1969
  - Utah State Route 8 (1969-1977), the former state highway, while the alignment spanned within just Utah County, that ran from SR‑27 (US‑6) at Moark Junction east of Spanish Fork northerly to SR‑1 (I‑15) north of Lehi and was a legislative overlay for a short section of US‑89
  - Utah State Route 8 (1910-1969), the former state highway, while the alignment spanned through Emery, Carbon, Wasatch and Utah counties, that ran from SR‑1 (I‑15) north of Lehi southeasterly to SR‑4 (I‑70/US‑6/US‑50) west of Green River and was a legislative overlay for a short section of US‑89 and a long section of US‑6

== See also ==
- List of state highways in Utah
- List of highways numbered 8
