= Utah State Route 56 =

State highway in Utah, United States

State Route 56

Route information
- Maintained by UDOT
- Length: 61.502 mi (98.978 km)
- Existed: 1931–present

Major junctions
- West end: SR 319 at the Nevada state line near Modena
- SR-18 in Beryl Junction; I-15 in Cedar City
- East end: SR-130 in Cedar City

Location
- Country: United States
- State: Utah
- Counties: Iron

Highway system
- Utah State Highway System; Interstate; US; State; Minor; Scenic
← SR-55	→ SR-57

State Route 56 (SR-56) is a 61.502-mile-long (98.978 km) state highway completely within Iron County in southwestern Utah. SR-56 runs from the Utah/Nevada border to SR-130 in Cedar City.

== Route description ==
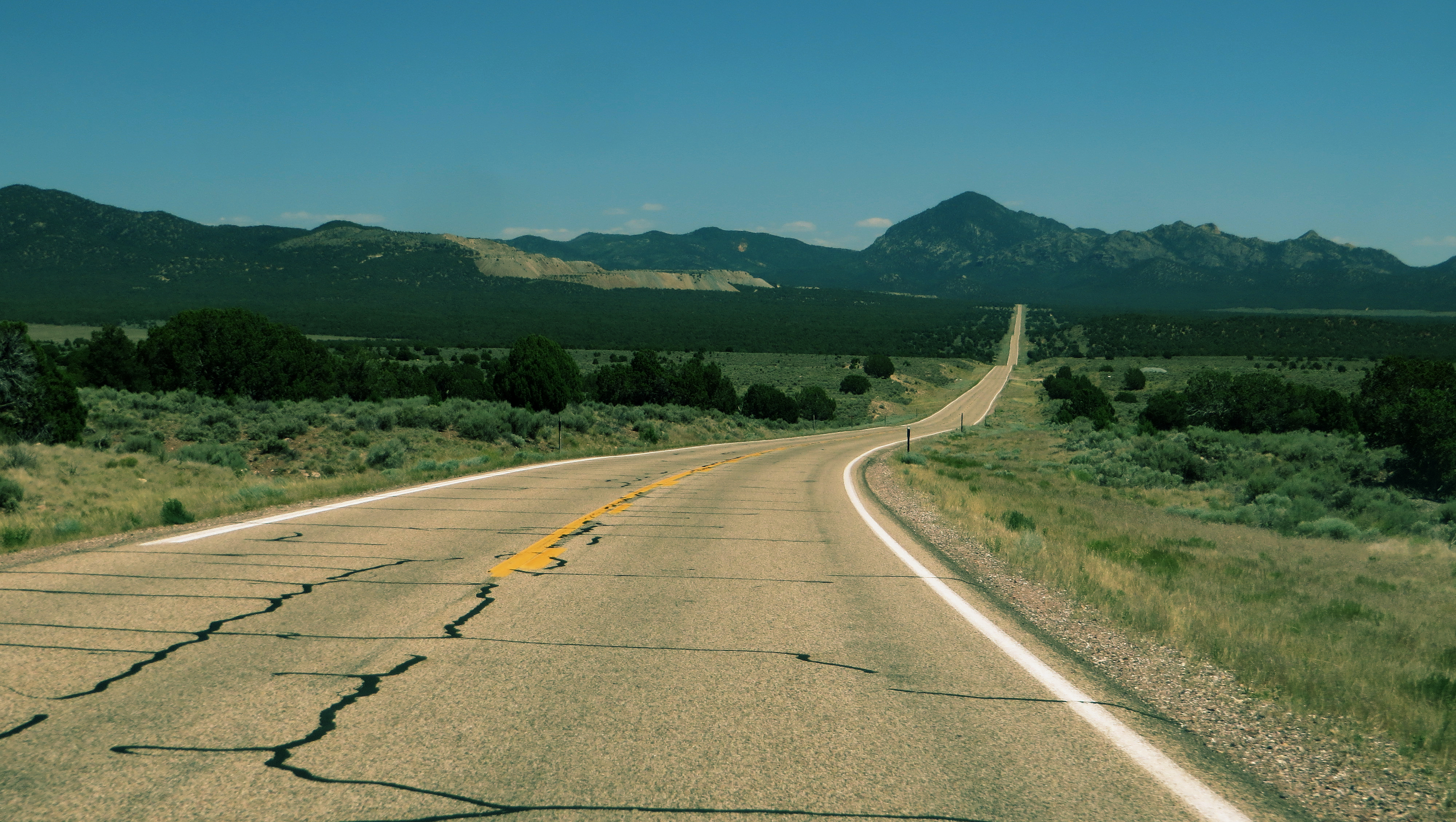
SR-56 between Modena and Cedar City approaching Iron Mountain

From its western terminus on the Nevada border near Modena, the route heads northeast until reaching Modena, where it turns southeast. It continues this direction until Newcastle, where it begins heading east and then southeast. After a junction with Pinto Road, it leaves the Harmony Mountains, enters Cedar Valley, then the route heads northeast until entering Cedar City, where it runs east until its eastern terminus.

The portion of SR-56 from Iron Springs Road west of Cedar City to the eastern terminus at SR-130 is part of the National Highway System.

== History ==
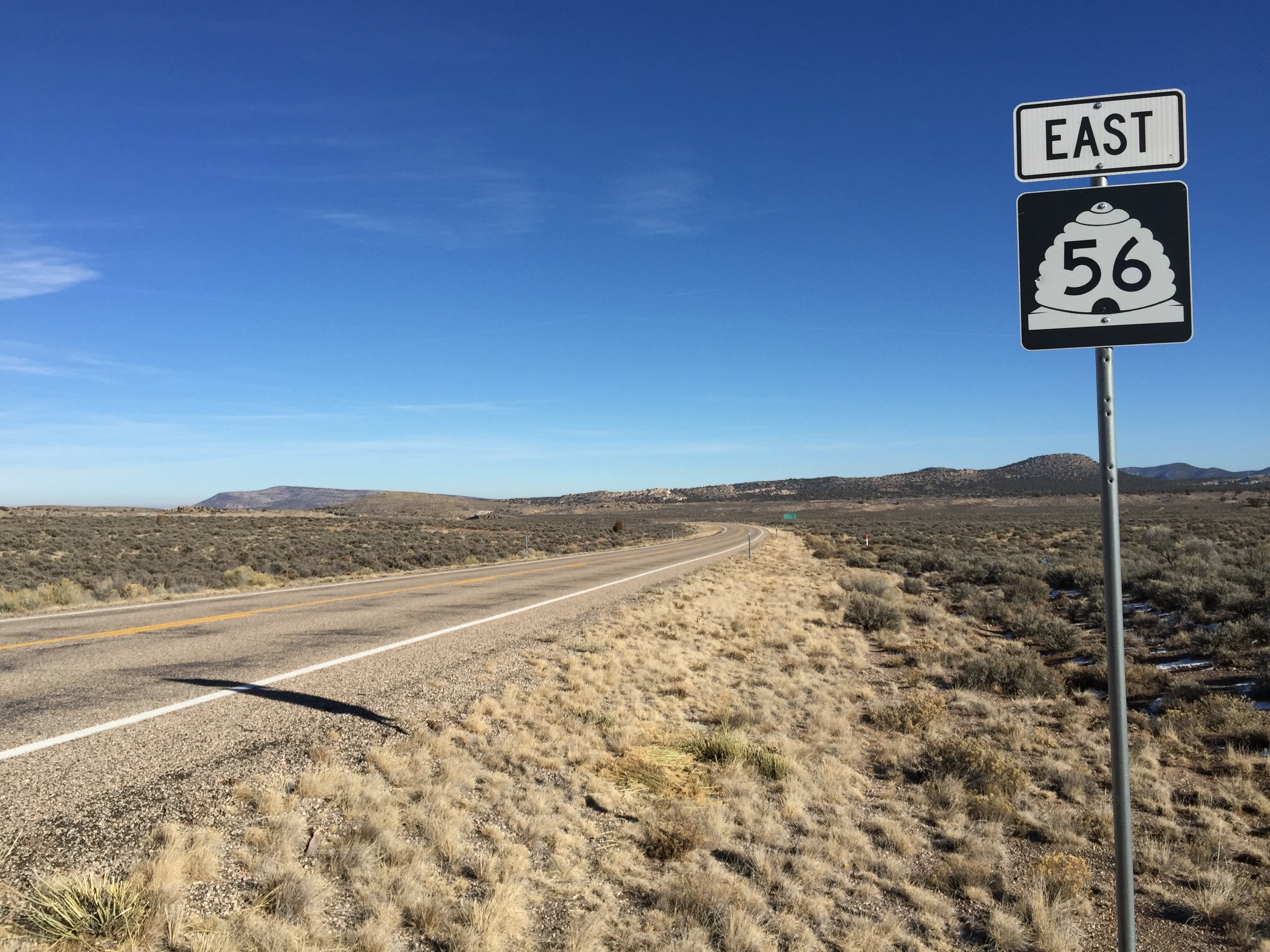
View east from the west end of SR-56 at the Nevada state line

The road from Beryl Junction west to Modena became a state highway in 1918, and in 1927 the legislature extended it west to the Nevada state line (at SR 25) and numbered it as part of SR-18. A connection from SR-18 at Beryl Junction east to SR-1 (US-91, now SR-130) in Cedar City was added in 1931 as State Route 56, and in 1935 that route absorbed the segment of SR-18 to the state line.

SR-56 originally crossed the mountains between Cedar City and Beryl Junction via Desert Mound, following the present Desert Mound Road. Two branches from SR-56 to Iron Mountain were added in 1935: State Route 120 directly south from about the midpoint, and State Route 198 from near the Cedar City end southwest via Iron Mountain to the Dixie National Forest in the direction of Pinto. Both routes were deleted in 1945, and SR-56 was realigned via Iron Mountain, with the portion of SR-198 east of that settlement becoming part of the new route. A 1953 law restored part of the old alignment to the state highway system as State Route 253, from the junction west of Cedar City to Desert Mound, and also created State Route 254 as a branch to Iron Springs. Both were given back to the county in 1969.

== Major intersections ==
The entire route is in Iron County.

Location	mi	km	Destinations	Notes
Modena	0.000	0.000	SR 319 – Panaca	Nevada–Utah state line; Western terminus
Beryl Junction	25.111	40.412	SR-18 (Beryl Highway) – Enterprise, St. George	
Cedar City	58.753	94.554	Lund Highway (formerly SR-19) – Lund	
Cedar City	60.514– 60.529	97.388– 97.412	I-15 – St. George, Parowan	Exit 59 on I-15
Cedar City	61.502	98.978	SR-130 (Main Street)	Eastern terminus
1.000 mi = 1.609 km; 1.000 km = 0.621 mi
