= Diamond Valley Cinder Cone =

Cider cone in Utah, US

Coordinates: 37.2430°N 113.6285°W

The Diamond Valley Cinder Cone is an extinct cinder cone in Washington County, Utah, and is one of two cinder cones in Washington County. The cinder cone is the youngest volcano in Washington County. It's located between Diamond Valley and Snow Canyon State Park. The Cinder Cone Trailhead is a trail that leads up to the crater, and it is one of the volcanoes in the Santa Clara Volcanic Field.
