= Utah State Route 131 =

State highway in Utah, United States

State Route 131
- Porter Rockwell Boulevard
- SR-131 highlighted in red

Route information
- Maintained by UDOT
- Length: 3.415 mi (5.496 km)
- Existed: 2016–present

Major junctions
- West end: SR-85 in Bluffdale
- East end: SR-140 in Bluffdale

Location
- Country: United States
- State: Utah
- Counties: Salt Lake

Highway system
- Utah State Highway System; Interstate; US; State; Minor; Scenic
← SR-130	→ SR-132

State Route 131 (SR-131) is a 3.415-mile (5.496 km) state highway in Bluffdale, Utah, United States, routed entirely on Porter Rockwell Boulevard.

== Route description ==
As of December 2025, the west end of the route is at Mountain View Corridor (SR-85). SR-131 proceeds northeast on Porter Rockwell Boulevard as a five-lane section of the highway. It crosses a bridge over the Utah and Salt Lake Canal, Jordan River, tracks for the Union Pacific Railroad and FrontRunner commuter rail, and Jordan and Salt Lake City Canal. At Harmon Day road it continues northeast as a two-lane road with a center turn lane. It passes through newer developments in Bluffdale, as well as Summit Academy High School. The route straightens out to the north to continue on to its eastern terminus at an intersection with 14600 South (SR-140), just south of the Utah State Prison.

== History ==
The route was created by an action of the Utah Transportation Commission on September 16, 2016, which officially designated SR-131 along Porter Rockwell Boulevard from SR-68 to SR-140. In exchange, the section of SR-140 west of 800 West was cancelled.

== Major intersections ==
The entire route is in Bluffdale, Salt Lake County.

mi	km	Destinations	Notes
0.000	0.000	SR-85 (Mountain View Corridor)	Western terminus
0.637	1.025	SR-68 (Redwood Road)	
1.880	3.026	Harmon Day Drive north	
3.415	5.496	SR-140 (West 14600 South)	Eastern terminus
1.000 mi = 1.609 km; 1.000 km = 0.621 mi

== See also ==
- List of state highways in Utah
