= Diamond Valley, Utah =

Unincorporated community in the state of Utah, United States

- Unincorporated community
- Location of Diamond Valley within the State of Utah Diamond Valley (the United States)
- Coordinates: 37°15′07″N 113°36′41″W
- Country: United States
- State: Utah
- County: Washington
- Elevation: 4,547 ft (1,386 m)
- Time zone: UTC-7 (Mountain (MST))
  - Summer (DST): UTC-6 (MDT)
- GNIS feature ID: 1440452

Diamond Valley is an unincorporated community in Washington County in the U.S. state of Utah. It is located in the geophysical feature of the same name.

As of 2010, the buildings are almost entirely residential, surrounded by large tracts of government-owned land used for grazing livestock. It includes part of Snow Canyon State Park that features an extinct volcanic cinder cone.
