= Beryl Junction, Utah =

- CDP
- Location in Iron County and the state of Utah.
- Coordinates: 37°42′04″N 113°39′13″W
- Country: United States
- State: Utah
- County: Iron
- Founded: 1909
- Named for: Beryl, Utah

Area
  - Total: 1.8 sq mi (4.7 km^{2})
  - Land: 1.8 sq mi (4.7 km^{2})
  - Water: 0.0 sq mi (0 km^{2})
- Elevation: 5,184 ft (1,580 m)

Population (2020)
  - Total: 161
  - Density: 89/sq mi (35/km^{2})
- Time zone: UTC-7 (Mountain (MST))
  - Summer (DST): UTC-6 (MDT)
- ZIP code: 84714
- Area code: 435
- GNIS feature ID: 2629946

Beryl Junction (/ˈbɜːrəl/ BUR-əl) is a census-designated place (CDP) in Iron County, Utah, United States. The population was 161 at the 2020 census. Beryl Junction Airport, a small, private airport, is located there.

== Geography ==
Beryl Junction is located at (and specifically the name of) the junction of two state highways, SR-18 and SR-56, in the southwestern part of Iron County, some 7 miles (11 km) northwest of Newcastle. The city of Enterprise is about 12 miles (19 km) south, and the small community of Beryl is approximately 13 miles (21 km) north. Beryl Junction sits on the southern edge of the Escalante Desert. According to the United States Census Bureau, the CDP has a total area of 1.8 square miles (4.7 km^{2}), all land. Most of it lies to the southeast of the junction itself.

== History ==
In 1909, the New Castle Reclamation Company invested in land near the Beryl Crossroads in the Escalante Valley. The company built a hotel to bring prospective buyers, promoting the land for agricultural development. The venture failed around 1915, but the community has grown slowly since then as modern irrigation techniques have made the farmland productive.

== Demographics ==
Historical population
Census	Pop.	Note	%±
2010	197		—
2020	161		−18.3%

As of the census of 2010, there were 197 people, 55 households, and 38 families residing in the CDP. There were 70 housing units, of which 99 were occupied. The racial makeup of the population was 54.3% White, 3.6% American Indian and Alaska Native, 38.1% from some other race, and 4.1% from two or more races. Hispanic or Latino of any race were 51.8% of the population.

Out of the 55 households, 52.7% had children under the age of 18 living with them. 49.1% had married couples living together. 14.5% of all households were made up of individuals, and 7.3% had someone living alone who was 65 years of age or older. The average household size was 3.58, and the average family size was 4.21.

The population was 53.8% male, and the median age was 23.5 years.

== Education ==
Elementary students attend Escalante Valley Elementary School, located right at the junction. Older students go to school in Cedar City.

== See also ==
- List of census-designated places in Utah
