= Utah State Route 282 =

Highway on the University of Utah campus

State Route 282
- SR-282 highlighted in red

Route information
- Maintained by UDOT
- Length: 2.944 mi (4.738 km)
- Existed: 1969–present

Location
- Country: United States
- State: Utah
- Counties: Salt Lake

Highway system
- Utah State Highway System; Interstate; US; State; Minor; Scenic
← SR-280	→ SR-284

State Route 282 (SR-282) is a state highway in the U.S. state of Utah. It is composed of three non-continuous segments, which combined consist of all the state-maintained roadways on the University of Utah campus.

== Route description ==
The route is made up of three connected segments.

=== Segment A (Campus Center Drive) ===
The first segment of SR-282 begins at the intersection of 500 South (SR-186) and Guardsman Way/Campus Center Drive (1580 East). It proceeds northeast for about 0.06 miles (0.097 km) before coming to a roundabout with South Campus Drive (segment B of SR-282), where segment A ends.

=== Segment B (South Campus Drive) ===
The second segment of SR-282 begins at the intersection of University Street (1340 East) and South Campus Drive (400 South), proceeding east on the latter. Shortly thereafter, the Red Line of the Utah Transit Authority's TRAX light rail system begins running in the median. The route continues to the east, passing Rice–Eccles Stadium before turning to the northeast. Shortly after passing through a roundabout where it meets the first segment of SR-282, South Campus Drive passes the University South Campus station on the Red Line. It then passes the Jon M. Huntsman Center before coming to an end at the junction with Mario Capecchi Drive, which carries the third SR-282 segment.

=== Segment C (Mario Capecchi Drive/North Campus Drive) ===
The third segment of SR-282 begins at Foothill Drive (SR-186) and heads to the north on Mario Capecchi Drive. This road was previously known as Wasatch Drive, but was renamed after Mario Capecchi, a researcher at the University of Utah, after he won the 2007 Nobel Prize in Physiology or Medicine. The road continues to the north, passing South Campus Drive (the second SR-282 segment), where the TRAX Red Line begins running along the west side of the road. It continues past the Fort Douglas station on the Red Line and passes underneath the Eccles Legacy Bridge before veering to the northeast, along with the light rail. After bending back to the north again, it passes the Red Line's University Medical Center station, the terminus of that line. This area contains numerous medical facilities, including the University Hospital, Huntsman Cancer Institute, Primary Children's Medical Center, and the Moran Eye Center. After passing the medical complex, Mario Capecchi Drive comes to an end at North Campus Drive, where SR-282 turns west. North Campus Drive continues west and south for approximately another 0.7 miles (1.1 km). SR-282 ends where North Campus Drive turns west and becomes 100 South.

== History ==
The first roads on the University were added to the state highway system in 1935 as part of SR-186. However, in 1962, they were split off as SR-181A. In 1969, route numbers greater than 280 were dedicated to routes serving state parks and institutions, and SR-181A became SR-282 as a result.

As it was defined in 1969, the route consisted of three main segments. The first segment began at 500 South and went north on 1500 East, turning right on the Peripheral Road (now South Campus Drive) and proceeding east to Wasatch Drive (now Mario Capecchi Drive). The second segment was a short connection from 500 South to the Peripheral Road on Guardsman Way (Campus Center Drive), while the third segment consisted of all of Wasatch Drive, from Foothill Drive to what is now North Campus Drive. At some point between then and 1988, the route was extended east on North Campus Drive and Medical Drive North to the University Hospital.

In 1988, the northern end of SR-282 was realigned to the east onto the newly built Medical Drive. As a result, the portions on Wasatch Drive north of the Medical Drive junction and the spur to the hospital were removed from the state system, and maintenance of these segments was transferred to the University of Utah. When the legislature updated the legislative description in 1990, it extended the route west along North Campus Drive to 100 South, as well as west along South Campus Drive from 1500 East to University Street. The portion along 1500 East was removed from the description at this time, as that roadway had been replaced by a parking lot and a pedestrian walkway.

== Major intersections ==
The entire route is in Salt Lake City, Salt Lake County.

mi	km	Destinations	Notes
Campus Center Drive segment
0.000	0.000	SR-186 (500 South/University Boulevard)	
0.064	0.103	SR-282 (South Campus Drive)	
South Campus Drive segment
0.065	0.105	University Street	
0.478	0.769	SR-282 (Campus Center Drive)	
1.036	1.667	SR-282 (Mario Capecchi Drive)	
Mario Capecchi Drive/North Campus Drive segment
1.037	1.669	SR-186 (Foothill Drive)	
1.413	2.274	SR-282 (South Campus Drive)	
1.619	2.606	Wasatch Drive	Formerly included as part of SR-282
2.244	3.611	North Campus Drive/Medical Drive North	Route turns west onto North Campus Drive
2.438	3.924	Wasatch Drive	Formerly included as part of SR-282
2.944	4.738	100 South	
1.000 mi = 1.609 km; 1.000 km = 0.621 mi
