= Lund Highway =

- Lund Highway highlighted in red

Route information
- Length: 30.5 mi (49.1 km)

Major junctions
- South end: SR-56 in Cedar City
- North end: Lund

Location
- Country: United States
- State: Utah
- Counties: Iron

Highway system
- Utah State Highway System; Interstate; US; State; Minor; Scenic

Lund Highway is a road connecting Cedar City to the ghost town of Lund in Iron County, Utah. Although it is classified as a minor collector, it was once an important connection between the Union Pacific Railroad at Lund and the national parks of southern Utah and northern Arizona.

== Route description ==
The Lund Highway begins at an intersection with SR-56 in western Cedar City. It travels north through farmland before turning northwesterly through wide open terrain with only a few small access roads intersecting the highway before it comes to its end in the ghost town of Lund.

== History ==
State Route 19
- Location: Cedar City–Lund
- Existed: 1927–1969

The State Road Commission designated a state highway connecting Cedar City with Lund in August 1912. The purpose was to connect Cedar City with the nearest railroad station, that of the Los Angeles and Salt Lake Railroad (Union Pacific Railroad) at Lund. A connecting road—now known as Gap Road—running west from the county seat at Parowan through Hieroglyphic Canyon (now Parowan Gap) to the Cedar City–Lund road was added to the state highway system in December 1915. In 1919, the state legislature redefined the state highway system to include only a short list of roads and any federal aid projects. The road to Cedar City was kept since it was improved with federal aid, and the road to Parowan was dropped, but restored in 1921.

The Union Pacific Railroad began to promote a "circle tour" connecting Bryce Canyon National Park, Cedar Breaks National Monument, Zion National Park, and the North Rim of the Grand Canyon National Park in 1922. A new Cedar City Branch from Lund shortened the off-railroad distance, allowing the Utah Parks Company, a Union Pacific subsidiary that operated the tour buses and park lodging, to begin at Cedar City. Passenger trains on the branch usually operated only during the summer, however, while railroad-operated bus service on the Lund-Cedar City state highway ran year round.

The state legislature designated the roads connecting Lund to SR-1 at both Cedar City and Parowan as State Route 19 in 1927, and in 1931 the Parowan branch was split off, first as SR-128 and then in 1933 as State Route 127. A second connection between SR-19 and SR-1, following Midvalley Road past Enoch, became State Route 199 in 1935 but was given back to the county in 1943. SR-127 was removed from the state highway system in 1953 and SR-19 in 1969, automobiles having largely supplanted railroads as the preferred method of vacation travel.

== Major intersections ==
The entire route is in Iron County.

Location	mi	km	Destinations	Notes
Cedar City	0.0	0.0	SR-56 – Modena, Cedar City	Southern terminus
Lund	30.5	49.1	Main Street	Northern terminus
1.000 mi = 1.609 km; 1.000 km = 0.621 mi

== Gallery ==
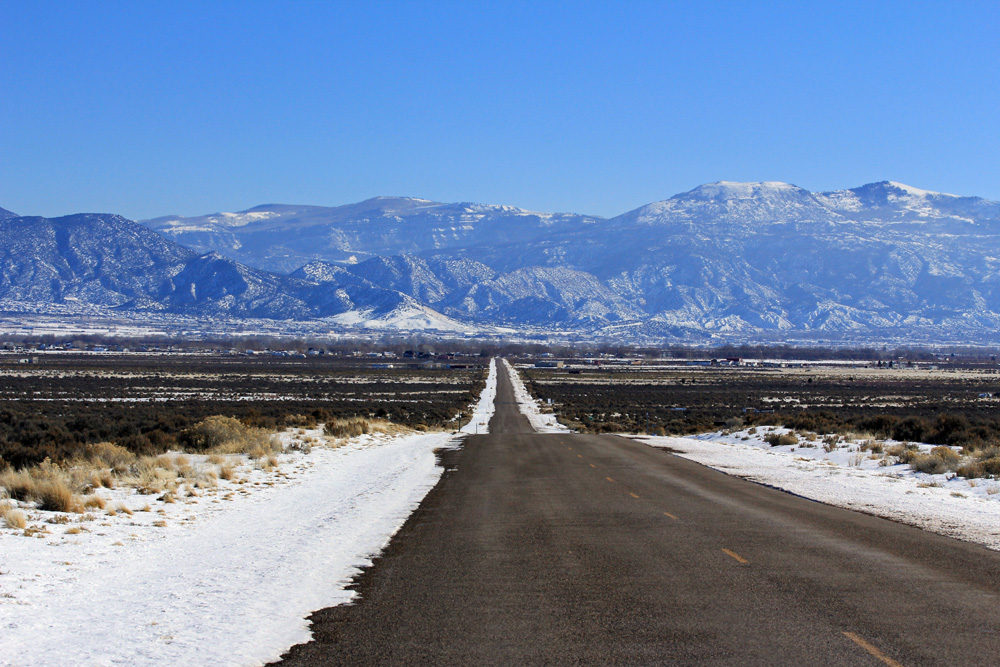
Lund Highway looking east

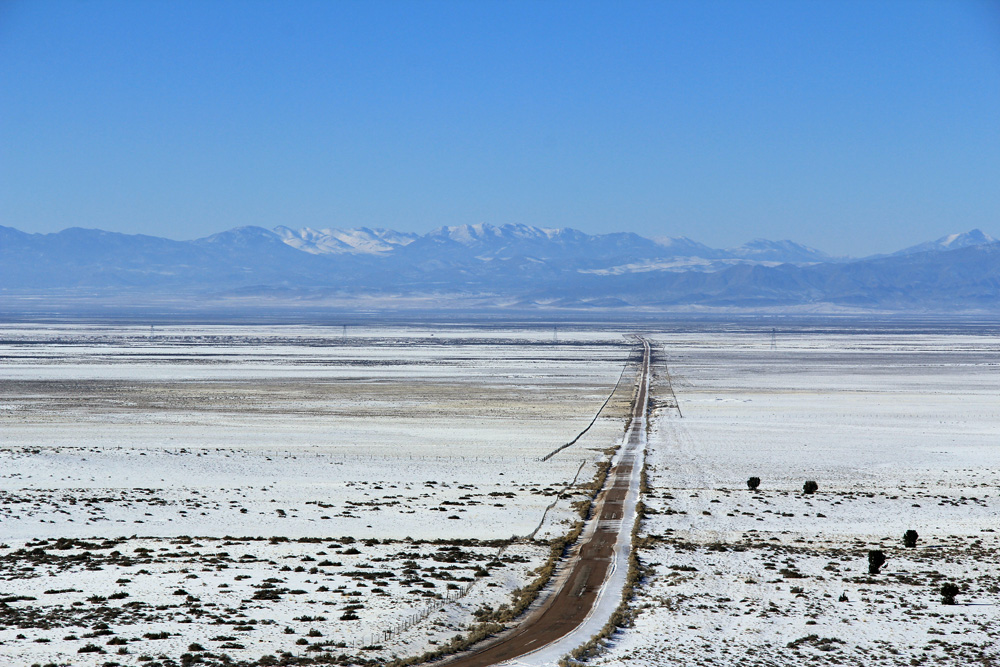
Lund Highway looking west
