= Utah State Route 219 =

Highway in Utah

State Route 219
- Main Street
- SR-219 highlighted in red

Route information
- Maintained by UDOT
- Length: 1.667 mi (2.683 km)
- Existed: 1985–present

Major junctions
- West end: West city limits of Enterprise
- East end: SR-18 in Enterprise

Location
- Country: United States
- State: Utah

Highway system
- Utah State Highway System; Interstate; US; State; Minor; Scenic
← SR-218	→ SR-222

State Route 219 (SR-219) is a state highway in the U.S. state of Utah. It runs 1.667 miles (2.683 km) east to west along Main Street in the city of Enterprise in Washington County.

== Route description ==
Route 219 begins at the western city limits of Enterprise and runs east along Main Street for 1.667 miles (2.683 km) until it ends at SR-18 on the east side of town.

== History ==
On September 28, 1984, the city officials of Enterprise, and the county officials of Washington County signed a resolution to delete then Utah State Route 307 at Gunlock State Park in exchange for adding Main Street in Enterprise to the state highway system. This resolution was officially approved by the 1985 Utah State Legislature.

Of note is that former Utah State Route 120 also connected Enterprise to SR-18, but instead of ending at the western city limits, it continued to the Nevada border via Terry's Ranch. This route was originally added in 1941 as a branch of SR-18 from Enterprise west to Nevada, where SR 75 continued as a shortcut to Panaca, but was split off as SR-120 in 1945. SR-120 was among a number of state highways deleted by the Utah State Legislature in 1969.

== Major intersections ==
The entire route is in Enterprise, Washington County.

mi	km	Destinations	Notes
0.000	0.000		Western terminus at west city limits
1.667	2.683	SR-18	Eastern terminus
1.000 mi = 1.609 km; 1.000 km = 0.621 mi
