= Utah State Route 34 =

State highway in Utah, United States

State Route 34
- Saint George Boulevard

Route information
- Maintained by UDOT
- Length: 2.150 mi (3.460 km)
- Existed: 1964–present

Major junctions
- West end: SR-18 in St. George
- I-15 in St. George
- East end: River Road in St. George

Location
- Country: United States
- State: Utah

Highway system
- Interstate Highway System; Main; Auxiliary; Suffixed; Business; Future; Utah State Highway System; Interstate; US; State; Minor; Scenic
← SR-32	→ SR-35

State Route 34 (SR-34) is a short east–west state highway in the city of St. George in southwestern Utah that connects Bluff Street (SR-18) on the west to River Road on the east while providing a connection to I-15. The route runs two miles (more than three kilometers) through central St. George as St. George Boulevard. SR-34 was a portion of US-91 when it passed through the city, and serves as the northern corridor of the St. George Business Loop for I-15; Bluff St. (SR-18) from Interstate 15's Exit 6 to St. George Blvd. serves as the southern half.

== Route description ==
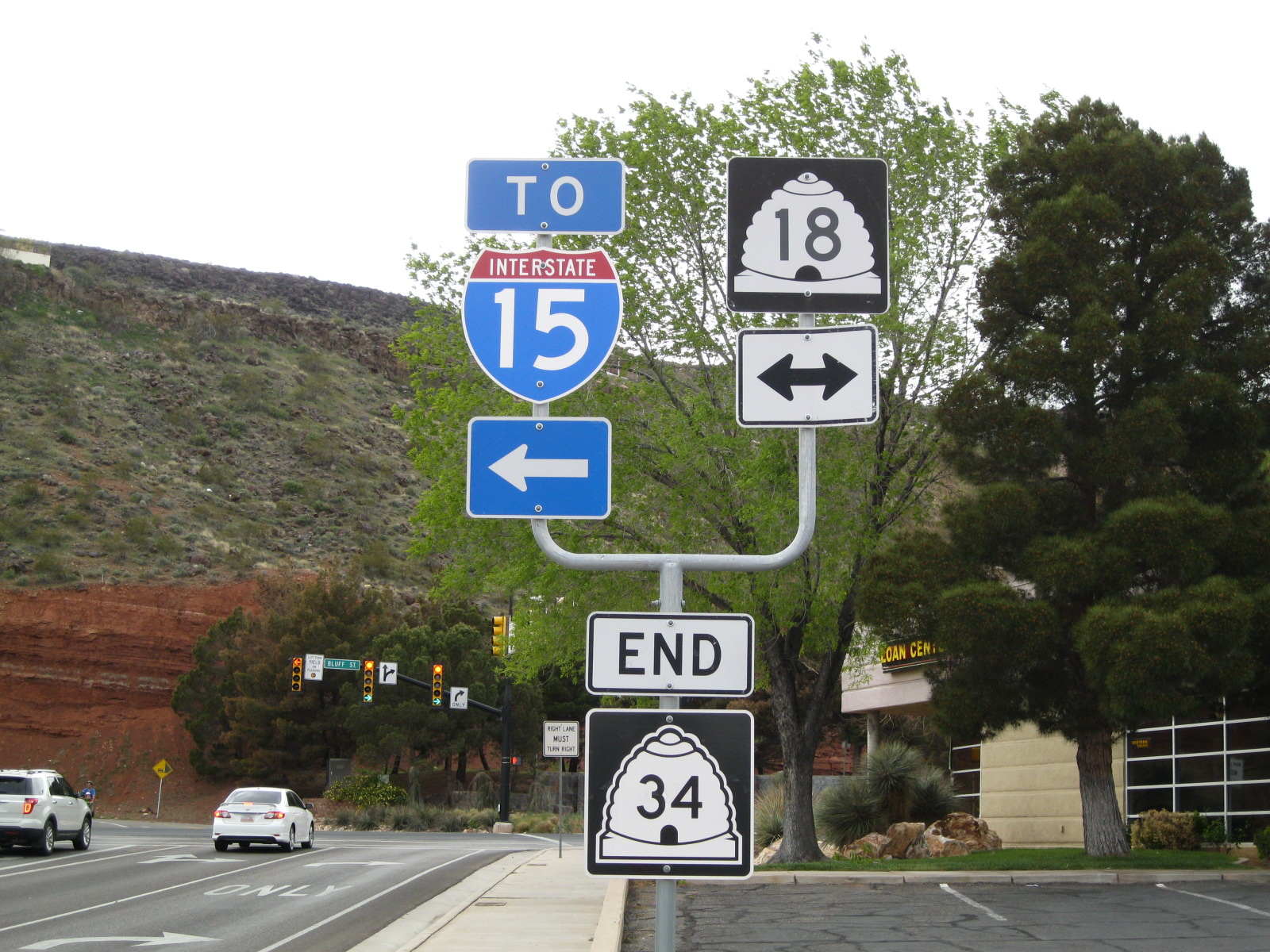
Western terminus

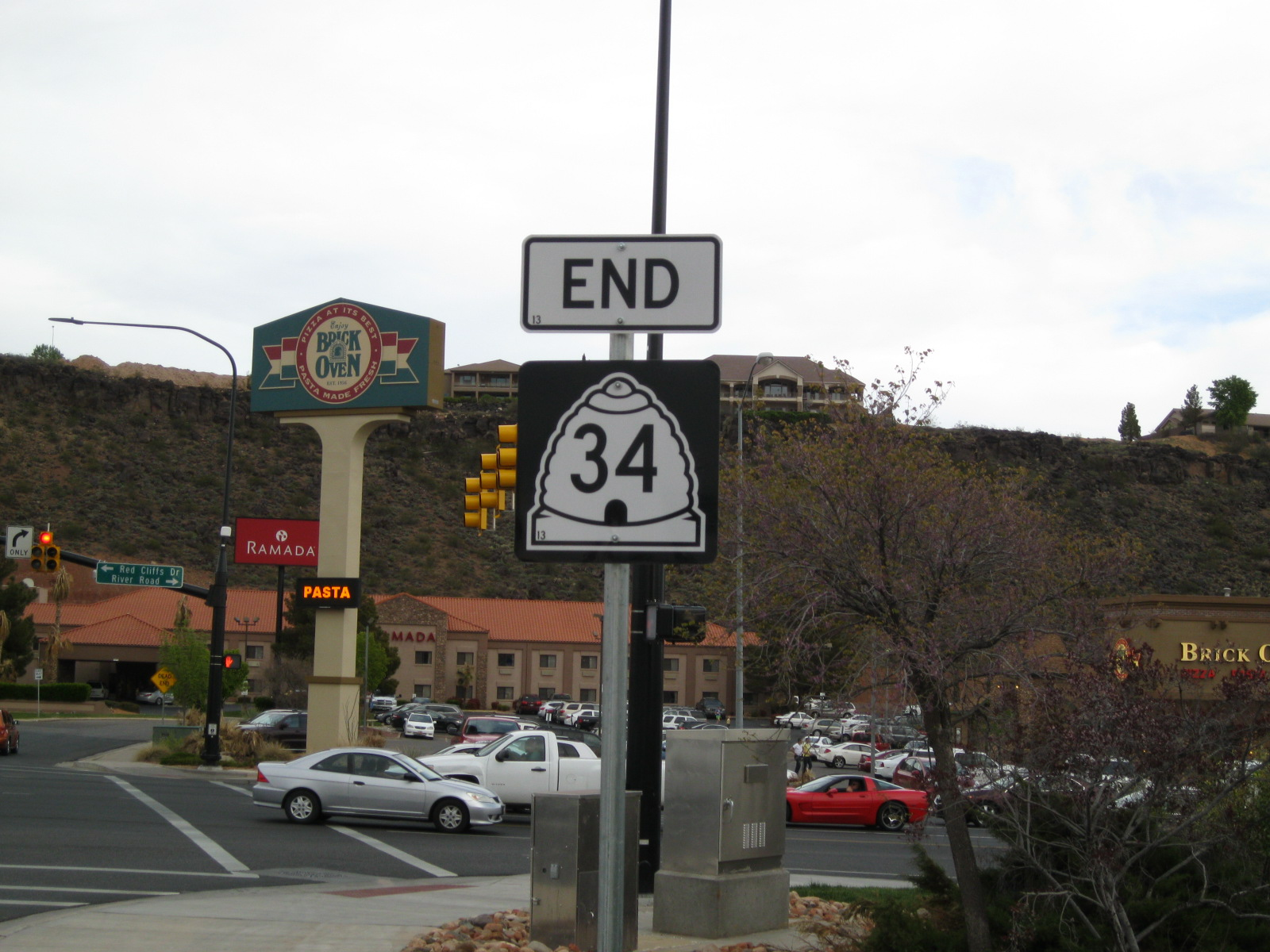
Eastern terminus

From its western terminus with SR-18 at Bluff Street, the route heads east on St. George Boulevard, situated along 100 North on the St. George grid system. About a tenth of a mile after the junction with I-15, the route terminates at River Road. The route is classified as an "urban other principal arterial" by UDOT.

== History ==
The east–west route through St. George was added to the state highway system in 1910, and in the 1920s it became part of (US-91). In 1964, the State Road Commission defined a new State Route 34 to be built on a new alignment along the west side of downtown St. George, connecting proposed I-15 at exit 6 with US-91 at St. George Boulevard and Bluff Street. In 1974, after I-15 was completed, SR-18 (which had been extended over old US-91 to SR-34 in 1969) was extended south to replace the original portion of SR-34, leaving the latter route on only St. George Boulevard. SR-34 was extended slightly east to River Road in 1991, since exit 8 on I-15 was converted from a trumpet to a diamond interchange. In the mid-2000s, St.George Boulevard had undergone major reconstruction with new pavement, updated traffic signals, waterlines and landscaped medians installed from Bluff Street to 1000 East. In 2013, the diamond interchange was completely reconstructed into a diverging diamond interchange to ease congestion in the I-15 interchange/1000 East/River Road area, and was the first interchange of its kind in southern Utah.

== Major intersections ==
The entire route is in St. George, Washington County.

mi	km	Destinations	Notes
0.000	0.000	SR-18 (Bluff Street) – Enterprise	Western terminus
1.896– 1.998	3.051– 3.215	I-15 – Las Vegas, Salt Lake City	Exit 8 on I-15
2.150	3.460	River Road	Eastern terminus
1.000 mi = 1.609 km; 1.000 km = 0.621 mi

== See also ==
- List of state highways in Utah
