= Utah State Route 280 =

State highway in Utah, United States

State Route 280
- 100 South
- SR-280 highlighted in red

Route information
- Maintained by UDOT
- Length: 0.399 mi (642 m)
- Existed: 1961–present

Major junctions
- West end: I-80 / US 189 in Coalville
- East end: Main Street in Coalville

Location
- Country: United States
- State: Utah

Highway system
- Utah State Highway System; Interstate; US; State; Minor; Scenic
← SR-279	→ SR-282

State Route 280 (SR-280) is a 0.39-mile-long (0.63 km) state highway completely within Summit County in the northern portion of the U.S. state of Utah. SR-280 connects Interstate 80 (I-80) in Coalville to Main Street in the same town. The entirety of the highway is named 100 South.

== Route description ==
The highway begins at a diamond interchange on I-80 at exit 162 west of the center of Coalville and heads northwest on a two-lane undivided highway. SR-280 enters downtown Coalville and terminates on Main Street.

== History ==
Prior to the construction of I-80, SR-4 (US-189) passed through Coalville on Main Street. To retain access to the town once I-80 replaced the surface road, the State Road Commission designated State Route 280 in 1961 as a short connection between I-80 and Main Street on Icy Springs Road (100 South). Before serving its intended purpose, the road briefly formed part of SR-2 (which had replaced SR-4 in 1962) and US-189, since I-80 was completed west of SR-280 before the portion east to Echo opened. A temporary ramp left the right side of SR-280 where the ramp to I-80 east now begins, and curved left into the westbound lanes of I-80 just before the Interstate crosses under SR-280.

== Major intersections ==
The entire route is in Coalville, Summit County.

mi	km	Destinations	Notes
0.000	0.000	I-80 / US 189 – Salt Lake City, Cheyenne	Western terminus
0.399	0.642	Main Street	Eastern terminus
1.000 mi = 1.609 km; 1.000 km = 0.621 mi
