= Utah State Route 140 =

Highway in Utah, USA

State Route 140
- 14600 South

Route information
- Maintained by UDOT
- Length: 0.936 mi (1,506 m)
- Existed: 1984–present

Major junctions
- West end: 800 West in Bluffdale
- East end: I-15 / US 89 east of Bluffdale

Location
- Country: United States
- State: Utah

Highway system
- Utah State Highway System; Interstate; US; State; Minor; Scenic
← SR-139	→ SR-141

State Route 140 (SR-140) is a 0.936-mile (1.506 km) long state highway in the U.S. state of Utah. It runs from 800 West in Bluffdale to Interstate 15 (I-15).

== Route description ==
SR-140 begins at an intersection with 800 West and 14600 South in Bluffdale, proceeding east on 14600 South. Following a crossing of the East Jordan Canal, there is an intersection with SR-131 at Porter Rockwell Boulevard. SR-140 then turns southeast to meet SR-287 (known as Pony Express Road), which serves the Utah State Prison. Shortly thereafter, there is a single-point urban interchange with I-15, where SR-140 ends. The road continues east as Highland Drive toward Draper. Just beyond the end of the state route, Highland Drive passes under a disused railroad viaduct, previously used by the Union Pacific Railroad, that is proposed for use by phase 2 of the TRAX Blue Line's Draper extension.

The highway is maintained by the Utah Department of Transportation (UDOT), who is responsible for maintaining highways in Utah. As part of this role, they regularly survey traffic on their highways. These surveys are mostly presented in the form of annual average daily traffic, which is the number of vehicles that travel a road during an average day during the year. In 2009, UDOT calculated that approximately 3,920 vehicles used SR 140 daily. No part of the highway has been listed in the National Highway System, a system of roads important to the nation's economy, mobility, and defense.

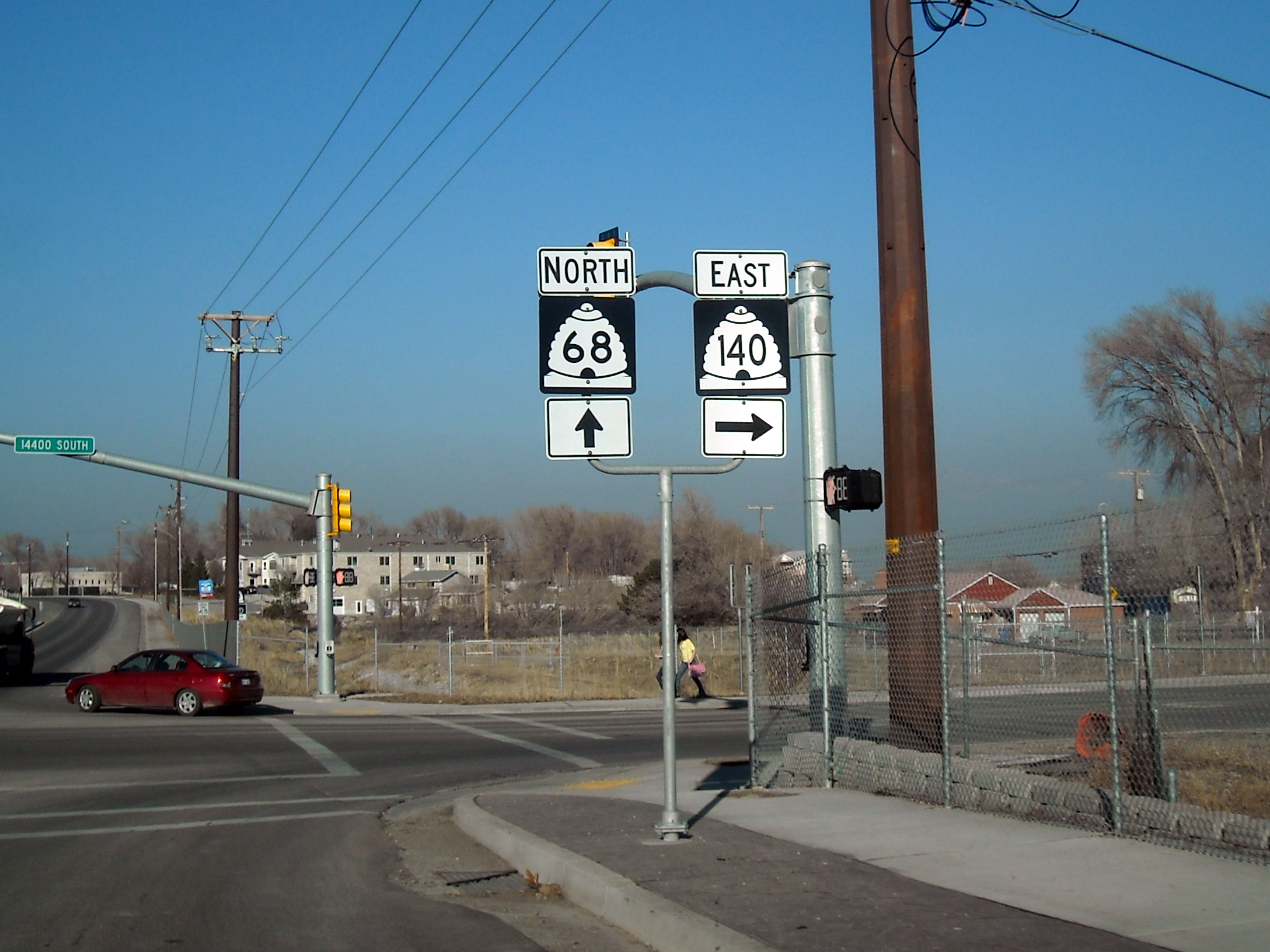
The former western terminus of SR-140, as seen from SR-68 northbound

== History ==
State Route 140, otherwise known as Bluffdale Road, was first designated as State Route 160 in 1933, renamed to State Route 161 in 1935, and deleted from the state highway system in 1953. In 1984, the route was once again added to the state highway system, this time as SR-140 (and in the process co-opted 0.18 miles (0.29 km) from the south end of SR-287).

In 2016, the segment of SR-140 west of 800 West was turned over to the city of Bluffdale. This was done in exchange for UDOT taking over the already-built segment of Porter Rockwell Boulevard as SR-131, with plans to build a bridge over the Jordan River to connect to SR-68 (Redwood Road).

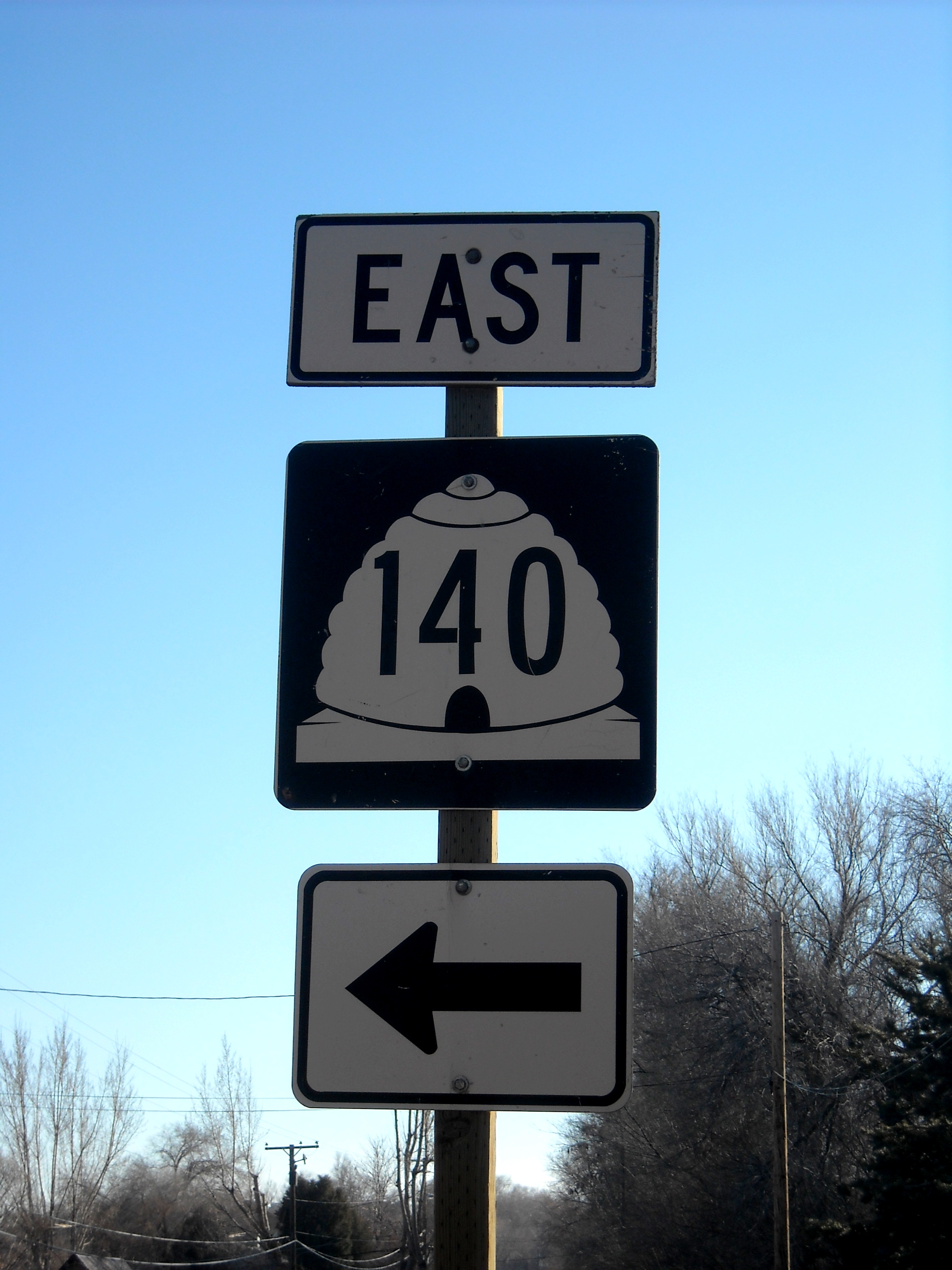
Former eastbound SR-140 in Bluffdale

Prior to 2016, SR-140 began at an intersection with SR-68 in Bluffdale. It crossed the South Jordan Canal before turning south for about 0.3 miles (0.48 km). It then turned east again and crossed the Jordan River. After an intersection with Spring View Parkway within a residential area, it bumped slightly northward to cross over the Union Pacific Railroad and the FrontRunner commuter rail line. An area near this crossing was considered as a possible location for a FrontRunner station, but the Draper Station was built much further north. It passed a Sherwin-Williams building before entering a more commercial area.

== Major intersections ==
The entire route is in Salt Lake County.

Location	mi	km	Destinations	Notes
Bluffdale	0.000	0.000	800 West	Western terminus
Bluffdale	0.457	0.735	SR-131 (Porter Rockwell Boulevard)	
Bluffdale–Draper line	0.750	1.207	SR-287 (Pony Express Road)	
Draper	0.827– 0.936	1.331– 1.506	I-15 (US-89)	Eastern terminus, interchange
1.000 mi = 1.609 km; 1.000 km = 0.621 mi
