= Foothill Boulevard =

Foothill Boulevard may refer to:

- Foothill Boulevard (Southern California)
- Foothill Boulevard (East Bay, California)
- Foothill Drive, also called Foothill Boulevard, in Salt Lake City, Utah

== See also ==
- Foothill Freeway
