= Utah Highway Patrol =

Police agency in Utah

- Patch of Utah Highway Patrol
- Abbreviation: UHP

Agency overview
- Formed: 1923; 103 years ago
- Preceding agency: State Road Patrol Police
- Employees: 600 (as of 2014)

Jurisdictional structure
- Operations jurisdiction: Utah, United States
- Map of Utah Highway Patrol's jurisdiction
- Area: 84,889 square miles (219,860 km^{2})
- Population: 3,101,833 (2017 est.)
- Legal jurisdiction: Utah
- Governing body: Utah Department of Public Safety
- General nature: Civilian police

Operational structure
- Headquarters: Taylorsville
- Troopers: 458 (authorised, as of 2021)
- Civilian members: 56 (as of 2021)
- Agency executive: Colonel Greg Holley, Superintendent
- Parent agency: Utah Department of Public Safety

Facilities
- Stations: 29

Website
- uhp.utah.gov

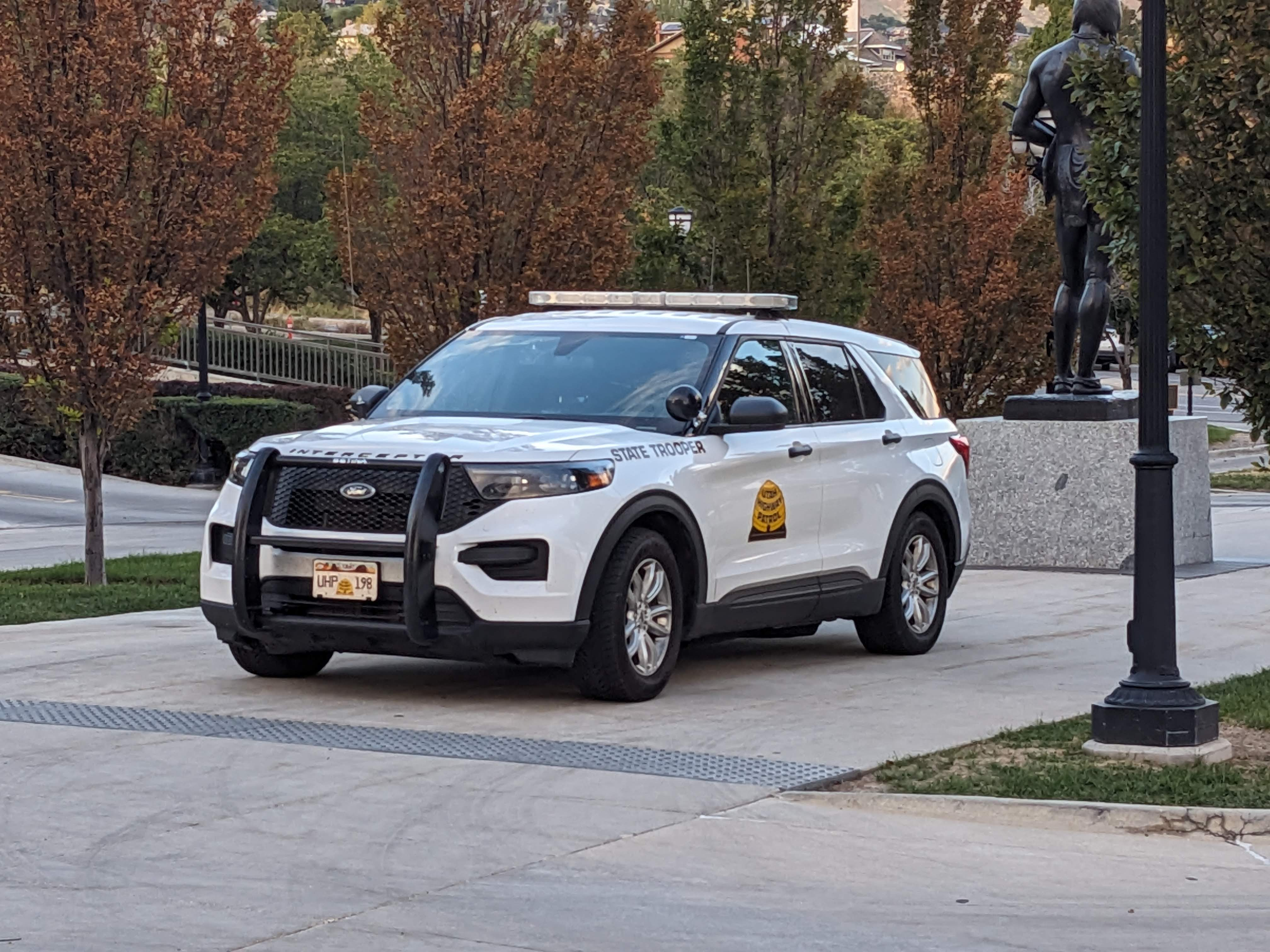
A Utah Highway Patrol vehicle parked at the Utah State Capitol

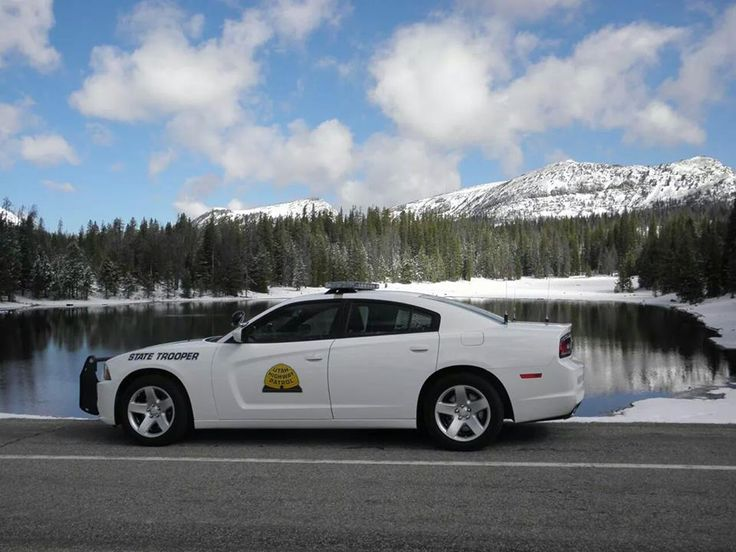
Utah Highway Patrol vehicle

The Utah Highway Patrol (UHP) is the functional equivalent of state police for the State of Utah in the United States. Its sworn members, known as Troopers, are certified law enforcement officers and have statewide jurisdiction. It was created to "patrol or police the highways within this state of Utah and to enforce the state statutes as required."

The Utah Highway Patrol is a division of the Utah Department of Public Safety.

== Rank structure ==
Title	Insignia
Colonel	
Major	
Captain	
Lieutenant	
Sergeant	
Trooper	

== Issued vehicles and weapons ==
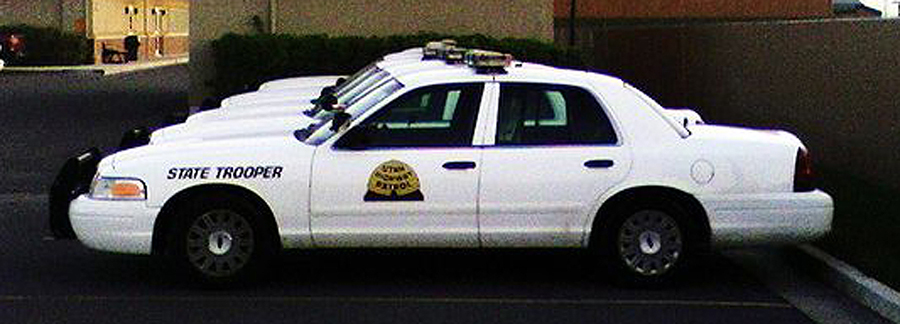
Discontinued Utah Highway Patrol police cruisers

The UHP has a mixed fleet of vehicles: Ford CVPI, Dodge Charger, Chevy Suburbans, and multiple Dodge and Ford pickups. The UHP also issues its troopers take-home cars, which can be used within 50 miles (80 km) of their residence. The Ford Mustang SSP was used from 1985 to 1993 and was highly reliable at the time. The Mustang was then superseded by the Ford Crown Victoria Police Interceptor.

The UHP issues its Troopers the Glock 17 Gen 4 9mm caliber or Glock 18 9mm. (The Glock 18 was, for a time, issued to Section 18: Governor's Security Detail Troopers only.) Troopers may also carry a personal weapon, provided it is chambered in 9mm, .40 S&W, or .45 auto. Troopers are also issued the Remington 870 12 gauge shotgun, and each patrol vehicle carries a Colt AR-15/M4 carbine rifle. Before issuing AR-15s, The Patrol began participating in a program with the US Government and purchased surplus M-14 rifles. In 2016, the Utah Highway Patrol surrendered all of its M-14 rifles back to the US Government, effectively ending its use of this rifle as a service weapon. Troopers also carry tasers, expandable batons, and pepper spray. The carbines are primarily issued to Troopers in urban and densely populated areas. The new issue Sidearm for the UHP is the 17-round Magazine Glock Model 45 MOS 9MM issued with a Holosun Model 509T red dot optics mounted on them. This sidearm replaced the Glock 17 Gen4 9MM. The UHP still allows their Troopers to carry a personally owned sidearm chambered in 9MM 40S&W and 45ACP.

== Controversies ==
=== Memorial crosses ===
On November 20, 2007, a judge ruled that the 14 white crosses erected by the Utah Highway Patrol Association could remain in place. An atheist group had filed suit, claiming the memorials were a violation of the separation of church and state. On August 18, 2010, the 10th Circuit Court of Appeals ruled that the white roadside crosses used to memorialize the deaths of 14 Utah Highway Patrol troopers are unconstitutional, government endorsements of religion on public lands. "We hold that these memorials have the impermissible effect of conveying to the reasonable observer the message that the state prefers or otherwise endorses a certain religion." The Utah Highway Patrol Association had claimed that "roadside crosses, in particular, are secular symbols," and have erected signs saying "not a state endorsement of any religion."

== Safe driving campaigns ==
"1-877-JAIL-FON" was a phone number created by the Utah Highway Patrol that allowed people to practice the "one phone call" from jail if arrested for impaired driving. The intention was to get people thinking about the consequences of drinking and driving as well create an open a dialogue between friends. The program targeted the 21-30 age group. Callers selected to speak with a choice of persons who were unhappy about their predicament, and were educated about the consequences of drinking and driving in a humorous manner. The phone number is no longer available.

== See also ==
- List of law enforcement agencies in Utah
