= Utah State Route 184 (1963–2007) =

Former state highway in Utah, United States

State Route 184

Route information
- Maintained by UDOT
- Length: 1.912 mi (3.077 km)
- Existed: 1963–2007

Major junctions
- South end: US 89 in Salt Lake City
- North end: US 89 in Salt Lake City

Location
- Country: United States
- State: Utah
- Counties: Salt Lake

Highway system
- Utah State Highway System; Interstate; US; State; Minor; Scenic
← SR-184	→ SR-184A

State Route 184 was a state highway in the U.S. state of Utah. It was a 1.9-mile (3.1 km) loop that connected U.S. Route 89 (US-89) in Salt Lake City with the Utah State Capitol. The route was originally added to the state highway system in 1935 as part of SR-181, and SR-184 was created in 1963 as a split from that route. It would remain until 2007, when it was deleted in a series of highway realignments in the Salt Lake City area. However, its route remains on the state highway system as SR-186.

== Route description ==
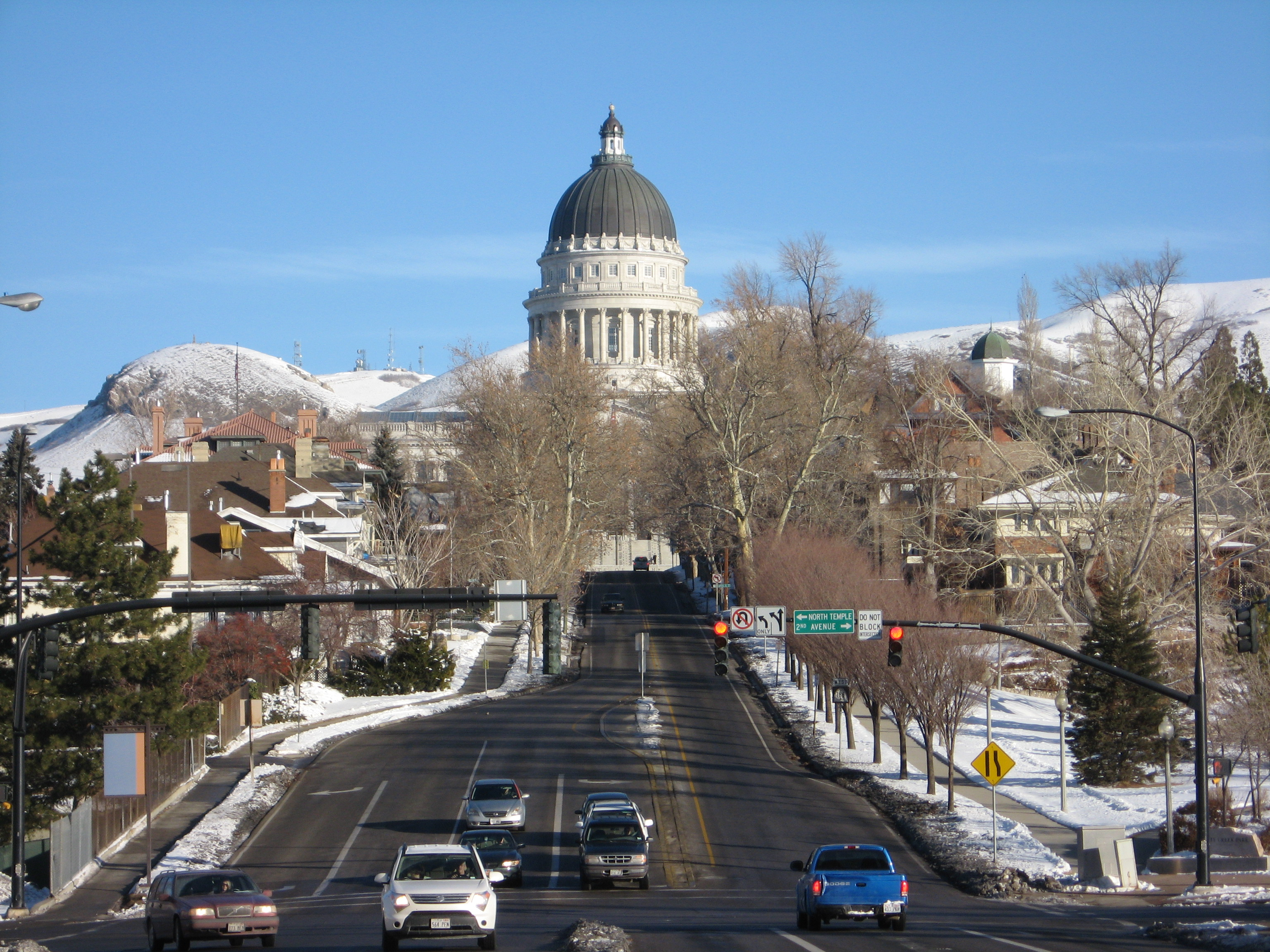
The south end of SR-184, looking north

SR-184 began in Downtown Salt Lake City at the intersection of State Street, North Temple, and 2nd Avenue. At the time, US-89 went west and south from this intersection, though it has since been rerouted. SR-184 left downtown on State Street, climbing Capitol Hill and entering the neighborhood of the same name before turning west at 300 North, just south of the Utah State Capitol. SR-184 continued to follow the south and west side of the capitol grounds, turning northeast on Columbus Street. After passing the capitol, the route turned northwest onto Victory Road and followed it down to its northern terminus at US-89 (Beck Street).

== History ==
The route from North Temple and State Street northwest to Beck Street by way of the Utah State Capitol was added to the state highway system in 1935 as State Route 181, which also extended to include much of South Temple and 1300 East. In 1963 the portion of SR-181 north of North Temple was split off as SR-184 to avoid a one-block concurrency with US-89A/US-91A along State Street.

In 2007, several highways in the Salt Lake City area were realigned to accommodate the construction of the Utah Transit Authority's TRAX Green Line along North Temple, which was SR-186. As a result, North Temple was removed from the state highway system. SR-186 was truncated back to State Street and extended north along what had formerly been US-89 and SR-184. US-89 was realigned to absorb the old alignment of SR-186 not on North Temple, while SR-184 was completely decommissioned.

== Major intersections ==
The entire route was in Salt Lake City, Salt Lake County.

mi	km	Destinations	Notes
0.000	0.000	US 89 (State Street, North Temple)	Southern terminus
0.289	0.465	300 North, State Street	SR-184 turned west onto 300 North
0.436	0.702	Main Street, 300 North	SR-184 turned north onto Columbus Street
0.604	0.972	Utah State Capitol (SR-293)	
0.757	1.218	Columbus Street	SR-184 turned northwest onto Victory Road
1.912	3.077	US 89 north (Beck Street)	Northern terminus
1.000 mi = 1.609 km; 1.000 km = 0.621 mi
