= Utah State Route 18 =

State highway in Washington and Iron Counties in Utah, United States

State Route 18
- Legacy Loop Highway
- SR-18 highlighted in red

Route information
- Maintained by UDOT
- Length: 51.005 mi (82.085 km)
- Existed: 1918 as a state highway; 1927 as SR-18–present

Major junctions
- South end: I-15 in St. George
- SR-34 in St. George; SR-8 in St. George; SR-219 in Enterprise
- North end: SR-56 at Beryl Junction

Location
- Country: United States
- State: Utah
- Counties: Washington, Iron

Highway system
- Utah State Highway System; Interstate; US; State; Minor; Scenic
← SR-17	→ SR-19

State Route 18 (SR-18) is a state highway in southern Utah, running for 51.005 miles (82.085 km) in Washington and Iron Counties from St. George to Beryl Junction. It forms part of the Legacy Loop Highway from St. George to Parowan. The highway closely follows the route of the Old Spanish Trail through Dixie National Forest.

== Route description ==
=== St. George to Veyo ===
SR-18 begins at Convention Center/Sunland Drive just south of the Bluff Street interchange with I-15 in St. George as an urban arterial and heads north through the west side of downtown St. George. After passing Sunset Boulevard (SR-8), the route has an inverted single-point urban interchange with Snow Canyon Parkway/Red Hills Parkway. The route has a dumbbell interchange at Ledges Parkway as it continues north, passing through Snow Canyon State Park. SR-18 continues northwest through Wide Canyon to Dammeron Valley and past Veyo Volcano. It then turns north into Veyo, running through the center of the town. This segment of SR-18 (between I-15 and Veyo) is listed as part of the National Highway System.

=== Veyo to Beryl Junction ===
SR-18 leaves Veyo heading northeast to Central, then continues north and northwest through mountainous terrain in the Dixie National Forest past the Mountain Meadows Massacre site and continues into Enterprise. It turns northeast in eastern Enterprise, then turns north through farmland outside of the town to Beryl Junction, where it ends at an intersection with SR-56.

== History ==
The highway closely follows the route of the Old Spanish Trail through the extreme corner of southwestern Utah. This portion of the trail is where the 1857 Mountain Meadows massacre occurred, a series of attacks by Latter-day Saint members of the Utah Territorial Militia and Southern Paiute Native Americans on a group of emigrants from Arkansas journeying through Utah. The attacks ended in the mass murder of at least 120 travelers.

The road from SR-1 (by 1926 US-91) at Enterprise Junction north through Enterprise to Modena was added to the state highway system in 1918. A 1927 law gave it the number and extended it west to the Nevada state line, where it became SR 25 to Panaca. In 1935, the portion from Beryl Junction west to Nevada became an extension of SR-56, which ran east from Beryl Junction to Cedar City. A branch from Enterprise west to Nevada, where SR 75 continued as a shortcut to Panaca, was added to SR-18 in 1941, but split off as SR-120 in 1945. At the southern end of the route, SR-18 was extended over US-91 in 1969 toward future I-15 (which was replacing US-91), putting the south end at SR-34, at the modern intersection of Bluff Street and St. George Blvd in St. George. A further extension to I-15 at exit 6 was made in 1974, replacing the south half of SR-34.

== Major intersections ==
County	Location	mi	km	Destinations	Notes
Washington	Saint George	0.000	0.000	Frontage Road	Southern terminus
Washington	Saint George	0.043– 0.289	0.069– 0.465	I-15 – Las Vegas, Salt Lake City	Exit 6 on I-15
Washington	Saint George	2.103	3.384	SR-34 east (Saint George Boulevard)	Former US-91
Washington	Saint George	3.181	5.119	SR-8 west (Sunset Boulevard)	Former US-91
Washington	Saint George	3.844	6.186	Snow Canyon Parkway/Red Hills Parkway – Snow Canyon State Park	Inverted single-point urban interchange
Washington	Saint George	8.751	14.083	Ledges Parkway	Dumbbell interchange
Washington	Enterprise	40.338	64.918	SR-219 west (Main Street)	Previously SR-120
Iron	Beryl Junction	51.005	82.085	SR-56 – Modena, Cedar City	Northern terminus
1.000 mi = 1.609 km; 1.000 km = 0.621 mi
