= Santa Clara Volcano =

Mountain in the American state of Utah

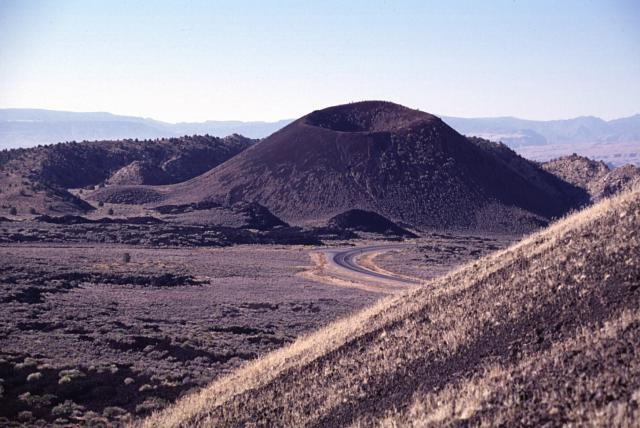
- View of the southern Santa Clara cinder cone from the flanks of the northern one.

Highest point
- Elevation: 4843+ ft (1476+ m) NAVD 88
- Coordinates: 37°15′22″N 113°37′33″W

Geography
- Location within Utah
- Location: Washington County, Utah; United States

Geology
- Rock age: 1,400,000 yrs
- Mountain type(s): Volcanic field and cinder cones
- Rock type: Trachybasalt / Tephrite Basanite Andesite / Basaltic andesite
- Last eruption: 27,000 years ago

Climbing
- Easiest route: Hike

Santa Clara Volcano is a volcanic field and lava flow in the Diamond Valley in Washington County, Utah, United States. The most prominent features are two cinder cones that rise above Snow Canyon State Park. The southern cinder cone and most of the north cinder cone is within the boundaries of Snow Canyon State Park. The city of St. George, Utah is located in a volcanic field. The date of the last eruption is unknown.
