= Millsite State Park =

State park in Emery County, Utah, United States

- Location within Utah Location within the United States
- Interactive map of Millsite State Park
- Location: Emery County, Utah, United States
- Coordinates: 39°5′30″N 111°11′32″W
- Area: 638 acres (258 ha)
- Elevation: 6,100 ft (1,900 m)
- Operator: Utah State Parks
- Visitors: 23,261 (in 2025)
- Website: Official website
- Utah State Parks

Millsite State Park is a state park on the south end of Millsite Reservoir at the mouth of Ferron Canyon in western Emery County, Utah, United States, just west of the town of Ferron.

== Description ==
Millsite State Park offers access to off highway vehicle and mountain bike riding areas. The reservoir is open to swimming, boating, waterskiing, and fishing. Adjacent to the park is a public 18-hole golf course.

Millsite Reservoir is part of the Ferron Watershed Project, a multipurpose water containment completed in 1970 with the combined efforts of several agencies. Before the dam was built, there was an old dam at the site to service a flourmill, hence the reservoir name.

== Rock art ==
Northwest of the park, there are sandstone walls where Native American rock art and pioneer graffiti can be found.

== See also ==
- List of Utah State Parks
