= Utah State Route 8 =

State highway in Utah, United States

State Route 8
- Sunset Boulevard
- SR-8 highlighted in red

Route information
- Maintained by UDOT
- Length: 1.303 mi (2.097 km)
- Existed: 1996–present

Major junctions
- West end: Dixie Downs Road in St. George
- East end: SR-18 in St. George

Location
- Country: United States
- State: Utah
- Counties: Washington

Highway system
- Utah State Highway System; Interstate; US; State; Minor; Scenic
← SR-7	→ SR-9

State Route 8 (SR-8) is a short east-west state highway in the southwestern portion of the U.S. state of Utah, running entirely within the west side of the city of St. George. The route connects SR-18 to Dixie Downs Road via Sunset Boulevard in a span of 1.3 miles (2.09 km). Prior to 1999, SR-8 extended north to Snow Canyon State Park. However, the route was truncated to its current point that year.

== Route description ==
SR-8 begins on the northwestern side of St. George at the intersection of Dixie Downs Road and Sunset Boulevard, proceeding east on Sunset Boulevard as a five-lane undivided highway. Past Westridge Drive, the road turns slightly to the east-northeast. SR-8 terminates at its intersection with Bluff Street (SR-18), which continues south towards the historic downtown district of St. George.

The entire route has been included in the National Highway System.

== History ==
SR-8 was added to the state highway system in 1910, and in the 1920s it became part of US-91. After the new alignment of I-15 was built south from St. George, old US-91 southwest of SR-18, including present SR-8, was removed from the state highway system in 1974.

State Route 300 was designated in 1972 to serve Snow Canyon State Park, running from SR-18 south to the southern boundary of the park. In 1991, the Utah Transportation Commission passed a resolution to create a new State Route 8, pending roadway improvements, which would absorb the entire length of SR-300, and continue south through Ivins on Center Street and 200 East and southeast on Santa Clara Drive and Sunset Boulevard (old US-91) back to SR-18. Sunset Boulevard between SR-18 and Dixie Downs Road was so improved and added to the state highway system in 1996, and at that time SR-300 was renumbered as a second piece of SR-8. As requested by the Utah Division of Parks and Recreation so they could carry out their resource management plan, the latter portion was removed from the state highway system in 1999, leaving only the present extent of SR-8.

== Major intersections ==
The entire route is in St. George, Washington County.

mi	km	Destinations	Notes
0.000	0.000	Dixie Downs Road	Western terminus
1.303	2.097	SR-18 (Bluff Street)	Eastern terminus
1.000 mi = 1.609 km; 1.000 km = 0.621 mi
