= List of state highways serving Utah state parks and institutions =

- Standard highway markers for State Route 281 and State Route 320

Highway names
- Interstates: Interstate nn (I-nn)
- US Highways: US Highway nn (US-nn)
- State: State Route nn (SR-nn)

System links
- Utah State Highway System; Interstate; US; State; Minor; Scenic

In the U.S. state of Utah, some state highways have been specifically designated to serve state parks and state institutions. The range of numbers from State Route 281 to State Route 320 has been used for this purpose since 1969.

== State Route 281 ==
State Route 281
- Location: Utah Tech University
- Length: 2.05 mi (3.30 km)
- Existed: 1935–1991
- History: Renumbered in 1969

State Route 281 served Dixie College (now Utah Tech University) in St. George until 1991. It was created in 1935 as State Route 191, connecting SR-1 (US-91, now SR-34) to the college. The route was renumbered to State Route 181A in 1945, State Route 67 in 1962, and finally SR-281 in 1969. The route was removed from the state highway system in 1991 as part of the trade that created SR-8; the final routing was about 2.05 miles (3.30 km) long and extended south from SR-34 via 700 East to and around the college.

== State Route 282 ==
State Route 282
- Location: University of Utah
- Existed: 1935–present
- History: Renumbered in 1969

State Route 282 consists of three segments named Campus Center Drive, South Campus Drive, Mario Capecchi Drive, and North Campus Drive, totaling 2.942 miles (4.735 km). The route connects the University of Utah in Salt Lake City with several points on its border: SR-186 (500 South) at Guardsman Way, University Street at 400 South, SR-186 (Foothill Boulevard) west of Wakara Way, and 100 South east of Wolcott Street. The university roads were added to the state highway system in 1935 as part of SR-186, and were split off as State Route 181A in 1962 and renumbered SR-282 in 1969. The segments along Wasatch Drive and Medical Drive North were taken off the state system in 1988 and given to the University of Utah.

== State Route 283 ==
State Route 283
- Location: College of Eastern Utah
- Length: 1.33 mi (2.14 km)
- Existed: 1939–2001
- History: Renumbered in 1969

State Route 283 served the College of Eastern Utah in Price until 2001, running north from SR-55 (100 North) along 300 East and then looping around the college for a total distance of about 1.33 miles (2.14 km). The route was created in 1939, numbered State Route 182A in 1945, and renumbered SR-283 in 1969. The connection between SR-55 and the campus was moved from 400 East to 300 East in 1978 as part of a realignment of SR-55. In 2001, it was given to the city of Price so they could close one block of 600 North.

== State Route 284 ==
State Route 284
- Location: Weber State University
- Existed: 1940–present
- History: Renumbered in 1969

State Route 284 is a 1.713-mile (2.757 km) five-segment route that serves Weber State University in Ogden. It consists of a three-quarters loop with two outlets onto SR-203 (Harrison Boulevard) and two more onto Taylor Avenue and Skyline Parkway. The route was created in 1940, numbered State Route 184A in 1945, and renumbered SR-284 in 1969.

== State Route 285 ==
State Route 285
- Location: Utah School for the Deaf (former location)
- Existed: 1935–present
- History: Renumbered in 1969

State Route 285 runs for 0.333 miles (0.536 km) from 20th Street northwest to Monroe Boulevard. It formerly served the Utah School for the Deaf, but the land is now owned by the Ogden City School District. The road was added to the state highway system in 1935 as part of SR-182, and became SR-285 in 1969.

== State Route 286 ==
State Route 286
- Location: Ogden–Weber Technical College
- Existed: 1935–present
- History: Renumbered in 1969

State Route 286 is a two-segment 1.306-mile (2.102 km) route that loops around the Ogden–Weber Technical College in Ogden, with a one-way pair spurring west to SR-235 (Washington Boulevard) near that route's south end. Exits to Monroe Boulevard and North Street are not part of SR-286. It was created in 1935 as State Route 183 and originally serviced the Utah State Industrial School. It was renumbered SR-286 in 1969, while the Industrial School closed in 1983 and was replaced by the current college in 1984.

== State Route 287 ==
State Route 287
- Location: Utah State Prison
- Length: 0.4234 mi (681.4 m)
- Existed: 1935–present
- History: Renumbered in 1969

State Route 287 (Pony Express Road) is a 0.4234-mile (0.6814 km) state highway in Draper that connects SR-140 (14600 South) with Bitterbrush Lane (the site of the former Utah State Prison). Pony Express Road is also the west-side frontage road of I-15. The route was created as State Route 187 in 1935, serving the old Sugar House Prison on SR-4 in Sugar House. In 1941 the prison was moved to another former location, and the route was renumbered SR-287 in 1969. I-15 was built over the former US 91 by 1971, at which time SR-287 was reconnected to the state highway system via the new frontage road and 14600 South. The portion on 14600 South became SR-140 in 1984.

On July 15, 2022, the Utah State Prison was closed after the prisoners were moved to the new Utah State Correctional Facility (USCF) in western Salt Lake City. Although no longer serves its original purpose connecting to a state facility, as of January 2025, SR-287 remains as a state highway, with no designated state highway connecting the new USCF.

== State Route 288 ==
State Route 288
- Location: Utah State University
- Length: 0.985 mi (1,585 m)
- Existed: 1935–2007
- History: Renumbered in 1969

State Route 288 served the Utah State University in Logan until 2007. It was created in 1935 as State Route 188 and renumbered SR-288 in 1969. The final routing, stretching about 0.985 miles (1.585 km) from US-89 north on 1200 East and west on 1000 North to SR-237 (800 East), was deleted in 2007, simultaneously with the deletions of SR-237, SR-238, and SR-239 and creation of SR-252.

== State Route 289 ==
State Route 289
- Location: Southern Utah University
- Length: 1.920 mi (3.090 km)
- Existed: 1935–present
- History: Renumbered in 1969

State Route 289 is a 1.920-mile (3.090 km) rectangular route around Southern Utah University in Cedar City. It follows Center Street from the intersection of SR-130 (Main Street) and SR-14 west to 1150 West, south to 200 South, east to 300 West, and back north to Center Street. The route was created in 1935 as State Route 190 and renumbered SR-289 in 1969.

== State Route 290 ==
State Route 290
- Location: Snow College
- Length: 1.165 mi (1.875 km)
- Existed: 1935–present
- History: Renumbered in 1969

State Route 290 is a three-quarters loop around Snow College in Ephraim, following 100 North, 400 East, and Center Street from US-89 (Main Street) back to US-89, for a distance of 1.165 miles (1.875 km). The route was created in 1935 as State Route 189, changed from a spur to a loop in 1965, and renumbered SR-290 in 1969.

== State Route 291 ==
State Route 291
- Location: Utah Schools for the Deaf and the Blind
- Existed: 1935–present
- History: Renumbered in 1969

State Route 291 runs for 0.565 miles (0.909 km) from Harrison Boulevard in Ogden, across from 7th Street, east to and around the Utah Schools for the Deaf and the Blind. It was created in 1935 as State Route 182, running along 20th Street from SR-1 (US-89) east to the former campus at Monroe Boulevard. In 1962 it was extended east to Harrison Boulevard (SR-39, now SR-203). State Route 183A was created in 1939 and numbered in 1945, running east on 7th Street from SR-1 to what was then the Utah State Tuberculosis Sanatorium on the east side of Harrison Boulevard. This route was deleted in 1963 as a transfer for 12th Street, which was designated SR-205, but in 1968 the roads at the old sanitorium, then a new campus of the Schools for the Deaf and the Blind, were readded as part of SR-182. SR-182 was split between SR-285 and SR-291 in 1969, with the piece on 20th Street being removed from the state highway system.

== State Route 292 ==
State Route 292
- Location: SLCC Redwood Campus
- Existed: 1969–present

State Route 292 is a 1.718-mile (2.765 km) four-part route that includes a perimeter road around the Salt Lake Community College's Redwood Campus in Taylorsville. There are three outlets onto SR-68 (Redwood Road) and one onto 2200 West.

== State Route 293 ==
State Route 293
- Location: Utah State Capitol
- Existed: 1935–present
- History: Renumbered in 1969

State Route 293 includes "all roads and parking areas" within the grounds of the Utah State Capitol in Salt Lake City. This includes access from SR-186 (Columbus Street). The roads on the capitol grounds were added to the state highway system in 1935 as part of SR-181, and were transferred to SR-184 in 1963 and split off as SR-293 in 1969.

== State Route 294 ==
State Route 294
- Location: Utah State Hospital
- Length: 0.383 mi (616 m)
- Existed: 1935–present
- History: Renumbered in 1969

State Route 294 is a 0.383 miles (0.616 km) route that serves the Utah State Hospital in Provo. It begins east of 900 East, where Center Street curves into Seven Peaks Boulevard, and ends in front of the administration building. The route was created in 1935 as State Route 184, connecting SR-1 (then on 700 East) with the hospital via Center Street. When SR-1 was moved in 1963, SR-184 became part of SR-114, which had followed Center Street west of SR-1 (500 West). Center Street east of 500 West, including the hospital roadways, was removed from the state highway system in 1964, but in 1969 the hospital portion was restored as SR-294.

== State Route 295 ==
State Route 295
- Location: Orem DPS Office
- Existed: 1982–2003

State Route 295 served the Utah Department of Public Safety's Orem Office until 2003. The route was created in 1982 but deleted in 2003, since the land had been sold and the office moved to a location with no driver's license test course.

== State Route 296 ==
State Route 296
- Location: Utah State Developmental Center
- Existed: 1935–present
- History: Renumbered in 1969

State Route 296 begins on the north side of 700 North, west of 900 East, in American Fork, and loops around the Utah State Developmental Center for 1.424 miles (2.292 km). The route was created in 1935 as State Route 185, running east from SR-74 to the school, and extended east to SR-146 in 1941. The portion on the school grounds became SR-296 in 1969, while the rest was deleted.

== State Route 297 ==
State Route 297
- Location: Utah State Fairpark
- Existed: 1969–1999

State Route 297 served the Utah State Fairpark, including the Utah Department of Public Safety's Fairpark Office and driver's license test course, with a total length of 1.25 miles (2.01 km). The route was created in 1969 and deleted in 1999, since the Utah Department of Transportation had not maintained the road for some time.

== State Route 298 ==
State Route 298
- Location: Ogden Office (DPS)
- Existed: 1972–present

State Route 298 consists of the driver's license test course at the Utah Department of Public Safety's Ogden Office. It is located in South Ogden on the southwest side of US-89 (Washington Boulevard), east of the Adams Avenue Parkway. The route was created in 1972.

== State Route 299 ==
State Route 299
- Location: DPS West Valley City office
- Existed: 1977–present

State Route 299 totals 1.03 miles (1.66 km), and includes all the roadways at the Utah Department of Public Safety's West Valley City Office used for driver's license tests. This office is located at the northwest corner of 2700 West and 4700 South, across the former from the Rampton Complex (SR-317), in West Valley City.

== State Route 300 ==
State Route 300
- Location: Snow Canyon State Park
- Length: 3.74 mi (6.02 km)
- Existed: 1972–1996

State Route 300 ran southwest from SR-18 in Snow Canyon State Park from 1972 until 1996, when it became part of SR-8. The former SR-300, about 3.74 miles (6.02 km) in length, was dropped from the state highway system in 1999 to allow the Utah Division of Parks and Recreation to carry out their resource management plan.

== State Route 301 ==
State Route 301
- Location: Steinaker State Park
- Length: 2.039 mi (3.281 km)
- Existed: 1972–present

State Route 301 runs for 2.039 miles (3.281 km) southwest from US-191 in Steinaker State Park.

== State Route 302 ==
State Route 302
- Location: Rockport State Park
- Length: 3.916 mi (6.302 km)
- Existed: 1972–present

State Route 302 begins at SR-32 and runs northwesterly for 3.452 miles (5.555 km) in Rockport State Park.

== State Route 303 ==
State Route 303
- Location: Goblin Valley State Park
- Length: 1.770 mi (2.849 km)
- Existed: 1972–present

State Route 303 lies within Goblin Valley State Park, connecting Goblin Valley Road, a county road, with the overlook, a distance of 1.770 miles (2.849 km). It was created in 1972.

== State Route 304 ==
State Route 304
- Location: Hyrum State Park
- Length: 0.086 mi (138 m)
- Existed: 1972–present

State Route 304 is a 0.086-mile (0.138 km) route in Hyrum State Park, ending at the intersection of 300 South and 400 West in Hyrum. It was created in 1972, and was initially located farther southeast, at Center Street and 500 South; this is still where the route is defined in state law.

== State Route 305 ==
State Route 305
- Location: Big Sand Wash Reservoir
- Length: 0.47 mi (760 m)
- Existed: 1972–1989

State Route 305 served Big Sand Wash Reservoir (a former state park) until about 1989. It was created in 1972, connecting Arcadia Road to the boat ramp in the park, a distance of about 0.47 miles (0.76 km). However, between 1988 and 1990, "it was found there is no way to inventory said route", and it was deleted.

== State Route 306 ==
State Route 306
- Location: East Canyon State Park
- Length: 0.451 mi (726 m)
- Existed: 1972–present

State Route 306 runs south from SR-66, a distance of 0.451 miles (0.726 km) in East Canyon State Park.

== State Route 307 ==
State Route 307
- Location: Gunlock State Park
- Length: 0.22 mi (350 m)
- Existed: 1972–1984

State Route 307 served Gunlock State Park until 1984. It was created in 1972, running about 0.22 miles (0.35 km) from the parking area east to Gunlock Road in the park. In 1984, the route was removed from the state highway system as a trade for the addition of SR-219 in Enterprise.

== State Route 308 ==
State Route 308
- Location: Kodachrome Basin State Park
- Length: 2.14 mi (3.44 km)
- Existed: 1972–2003

State Route 308 served Kodachrome Basin State Park until 2003. It was created in 1972, running about 2.14 miles (3.44 km) from Cottonwood Canyon Road north within the park, and given to Kane County in 2003.

== State Route 309 ==
State Route 309
- Location: Millsite State Park
- Length: 0.357 mi (575 m)
- Existed: 1972–present

State Route 309 runs for 0.357 miles (0.575 km) north from Ferron Canyon Road, a county road, in Millsite State Park. It was created in 1972.

== State Route 310 ==
State Route 310
- Location: Minersville State Park
- Length: 0.353 mi (568 m)
- Existed: 1972–present

State Route 310 runs for 0.353 miles (0.568 km) in Minersville State Park, from SR-21 west to the parking area. It was created in 1972.

== State Route 311 ==
State Route 311
- Location: Fred Hayes State Park at Starvation
- Length: 3.916 mi (6.302 km)
- Existed: 1972–present

State Route 311 runs northwest for 3.916 miles (6.302 km) from US-40 in Duchesne to and in Fred Hayes State Park at Starvation. It was created in 1972, mostly following an old alignment of US-40 that had been bypassed when the Starvation Reservoir was created.

== State Route 312 ==
State Route 312
- Location: Willard Bay State Park
- Length: 0.573 mi (922 m)
- Existed: 1972–present

State Route 312 runs for 0.573 miles (0.922 km) in Willard Bay State Park, beginning at 2000 West in southern Box Elder County. SR-312 was created in 1972.

== State Route 313 ==
State Route 313
- Location: Dead Horse Point State Park
- Length: 22.506 mi (36.220 km)
- Existed: 1975–present

State Route 313 is a 22.506-mile (36.220 km) route that connects US-191 northwest of Moab with the overlook in Dead Horse Point State Park. It was created in 1975 as a replacement for SR-278, which would have connected the park to SR-279.

== State Route 314 ==
State Route 314
- Location: Deer Creek State Park
- Length: 0.767 mi (1,234 m)
- Existed: 1974–present

State Route 314 runs northwest from US-189 in Deer Creek State Park for 0.767 miles (1.234 km). It was created in 1974.

== State Route 315 ==
State Route 315
- Location: Willard Bay State Park
- Length: 1.760 mi (2.832 km)
- Existed: 1975–present

State Route 315 begins at US-89 in Willard and heads west on Willard Bay Road (750 North), across I-15 at exit 357, to and in the northern part of the park, for a length of 1.760 miles (2.832 km). SR-315 was created in 1974.

== State Route 316 ==
State Route 316
- Location: Goosenecks State Park
- Length: 3.513 mi (5.654 km)
- Existed: 1975–present

State Route 316 begins at the parking lot in Goosenecks State Park and heads northeast through unincorporated San Juan County for 3.513 miles (5.654 km) to SR-261 north of Mexican Hat. It was created in 1975.

== State Route 317 ==
State Route 317
- Location: Rampton Complex
- Existed: 1983–present

State Route 317 consists of the roads and parking lots of the Calvin L. Rampton Complex in West Valley City, which serves the Utah Department of Transportation and Department of Public Safety. It is located on the east side of 2700 West north of 4700 South, across the street from the DPS's West Valley City Office (SR-299).

== State Route 318 ==
State Route 318
- Location: Quail Creek State Park
- Length: 2.214 mi (3.563 km)
- Existed: 1992–present

State Route 318 begins at SR-9 in Hurricane and runs north for 2.214 miles (3.563 km) through Quail Creek State Park to Red Cliff Road, I-15's east side frontage road in Harrisburg (part of Hurricane). It can be driven from end to end without paying a park fee. It was created in 1992.

== State Route 319 ==
State Route 319
- Location: Jordanelle State Park
- Length: 1.203 mi (1.936 km)
- Existed: 1989–present

State Route 319 begins at exit 8 of US-40 and heads southeast to the gate in Jordanelle State Park, a distance of 1.203 miles (1.936 km). It was created in 1989 as part of the realignments that were made when the Jordanelle Reservoir was created.

== State Route 320 ==
State Route 320
- Location: Camp Williams
- Existed: 1992–present

State Route 320 consists of all roads within the Emergency Vehicle Operations Range of the Utah Peace Officer Standards and Training Academy at Camp Williams, a total of 2.19 miles (3.52 km). It is located on the north side of 10400 North, just east of SR-68, northwest of Lehi. It was created in 1992 "to clarify maintenance responsibility" for the roads, particularly with respect to snow removal.

Browse numbered routes
| ← SR-280 | → US 491 |
