= Utah Department of Public Safety =

- Logo of the Utah Department of Public Safety

- Flag of the State of Utah
- Abbreviation: Utah DPS
- Motto: Keeping Utah Safe

Agency overview
- Employees: 1,500
- Annual budget: $ 241,027,900

Jurisdictional structure
- Operations jurisdiction: Utah, USA
- Map of Utah Department of Public Safety's jurisdiction
- Area: 84,899 square miles (219,890 km^{2})
- Population: 3,101,833 (2017 est.)
- Legal jurisdiction: Utah
- General nature: Civilian police

Operational structure
- Headquarters: 4501 South 2700 West Taylorsville, Utah 84119
- Elected officer responsible: Spencer Cox, Governor of Utah
- Parent agency: State of Utah

Website
- Utah DPS website

The Utah Department of Public Safety (DPS) is a law enforcement agency in the state of Utah, headquartered in Taylorsville.

The Utah Department of Public Safety is under the direction of Commissioner Jess L. Anderson.

The agency is headquartered at South 4501 South 2700 West in Taylorsville.

== Senior Staff ==
Senior Staff	Title
Jess L. Anderson	Commissioner of DPS
Kristy Rigby	Deputy Commissioner of DPS
Jimmy Higgs	Deputy Commissioner of DPS
Mike Rapich	Utah Highway Patrol Colonel and Deputy Commissioner of DPS
Mark Zesiger	Lieutenant Colonel of DPS
Tyler Kotter	Chief of Investigations DPS - State Bureau of Investigation
Beau Mason	Major of DPS
Jeff Nigbur	Major of DPS
Hillary Koellner	Director of Communications and Public Affairs
Kim Gibb	Director Legislative & Government Affairs of DPS
Melanie Marlowe	Director Quality & Process Improvement of DPS

== Divisions ==
The Department of Public Safety has 11 divisions and bureaus:

- Utah Division of Emergency Management
- Utah State Fire Marshal's Office
- Utah Highway Patrol
- Utah Driver License Division
- Utah Statewide Information and Analysis Center (SIAC)
- Utah State Bureau of Investigation (SBI)
- Utah State Communications
- Utah State State Crime Lab
- Highway Safety
- Bureau of Criminal Identification
- Peace Officer Standards and Training (POST)
