= Lund, Utah =

Unincorporated community in the state of Utah, United States

- Unincorporated community
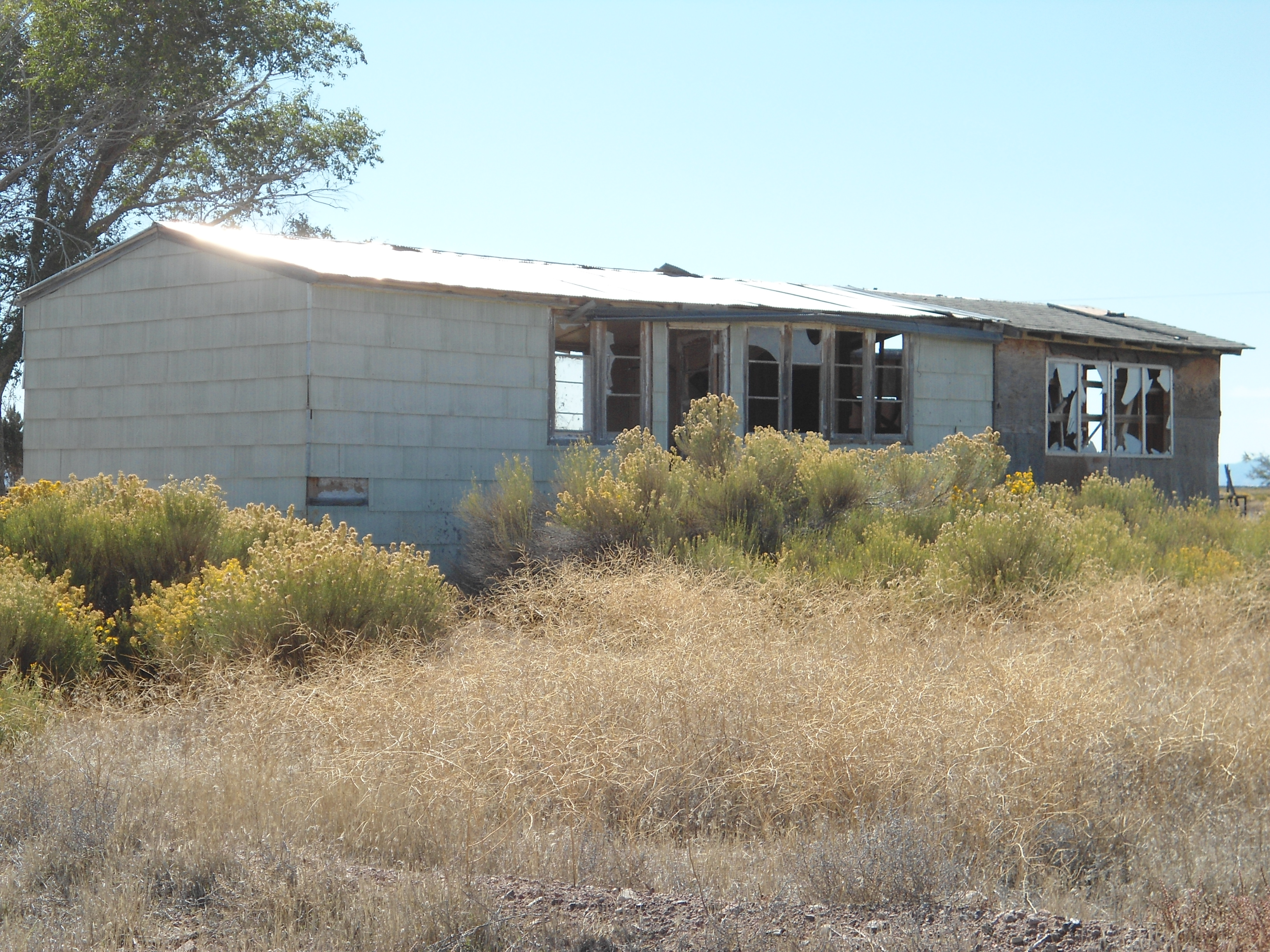
- Abandoned building in Lund, October 2011

- Location within Utah Location within the United States
- Coordinates: 38°00′27″N 113°25′54″W
- Country: United States
- State: Utah
- County: Iron
- Founded: 1898
- Named for: Robert C. Lund
- Elevation: 5,086 ft (1,550 m)
- GNIS feature ID: 1430015

Lund is an unincorporated location, formerly a town or village, located in the Escalante Valley of northwestern Iron County, Utah, United States, approximately 35 miles (56 km) northwest of Cedar City. The town, established in the early twentieth century, was a station stop on the Los Angeles and Salt Lake Railroad (later Union Pacific Railroad), and was a community center for early twentieth century homesteaders.

== History ==
Historical population
Census	Pop.	Note	%±
1910	24		—
1920	148		516.7%
1930	191		29.1%
1940	118		−38.2%
1950	42		−64.4%
Source: U.S. Census Bureau

Settlement activity in the Lund area began with the completion of the railway line through the Escalante Valley in the winter of 1898–99, but Lund's population remained extremely small until 1911, when the valley was opened to homestead settlement. The Lund townsite was platted in 1913, beginning a decade of relative activity at the location. The town was named for Robert C. Lund, who was a Utah State legislator, local mine owner, and a director of the Union Pacific Railroad. A population decline began in the 1920s, however, due to the failure of most of the homestead-era farms. Lund's most dramatic event was in February 1922, when a freak flood struck the desert valley and partially inundated the town.

Lund gained importance as a railroad junction in 1923, when the Union Pacific constructed a branch line from Lund to Cedar City. The branch was constructed in part to encourage travel to southern Utah's National Parks, and carried passenger trains during the summer months until 1960. At other times, passengers bound for Cedar City would board a railway-operated connecting bus at Lund, which followed State Route 19 (Lund Highway). As part of this construction program, the railroad erected what was the historic town's most prominent building, a stately depot designed by noted architect Gilbert Stanley Underwood. The last passenger trains stopped in Lund in 1969, and the depot building was razed the following year, marking the end of the town's railway prominence.

The railroad also carried all the iron ore from and allowed the commercial exploitation of the Iron Mountain District.

A post office operated at Lund from 1901 to 1967. Its closure reflected years of gradual population decline in the area, and only a handful of people live in the Lund vicinity today.
