= Gunlock State Park =

State park in Utah, United States

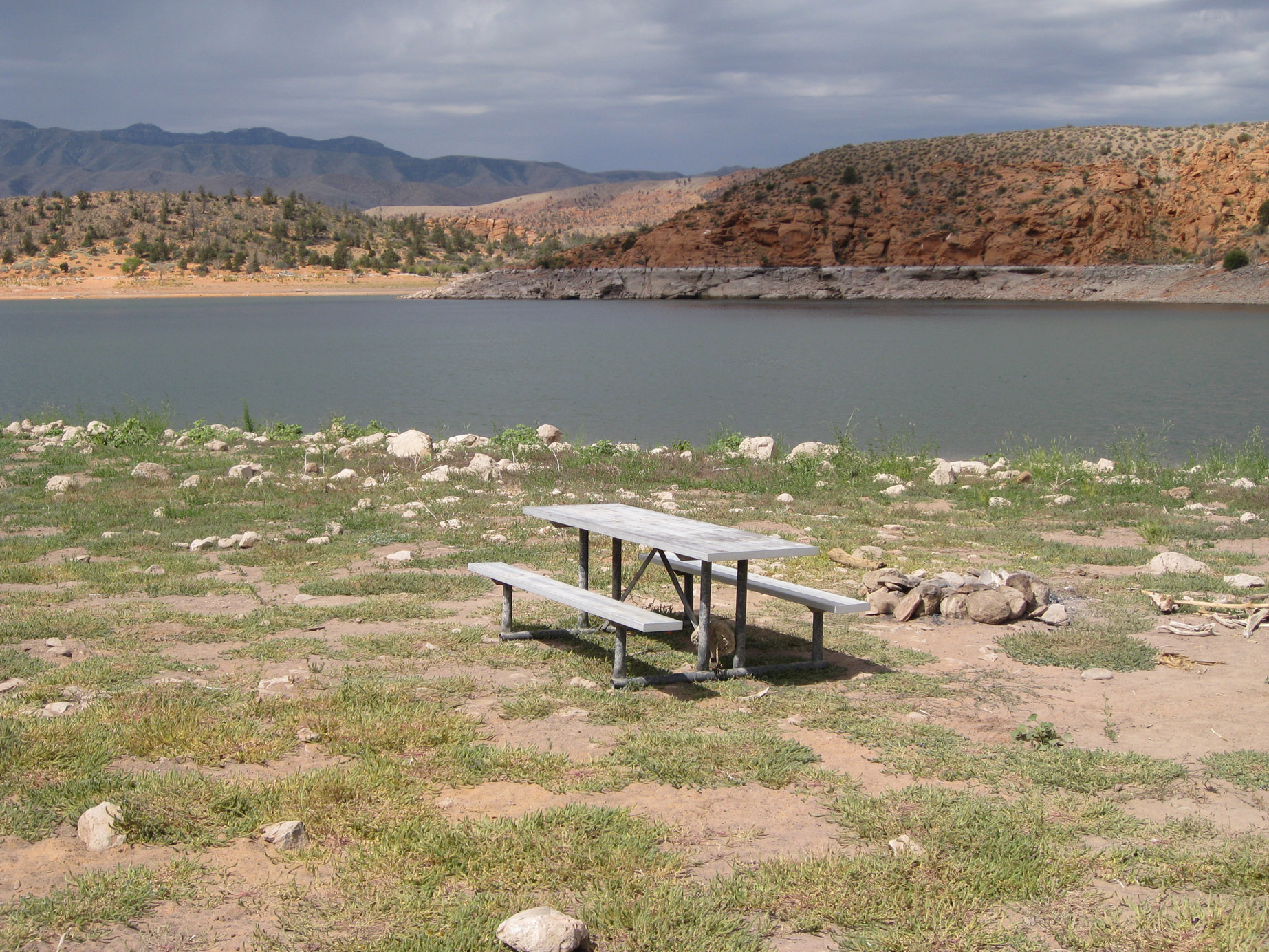

- Location within Utah Location within the United States
- Interactive map of Gunlock State Park
- Location: Washington County, Utah, United States
- Coordinates: 37°15′13″N 113°47′4″W
- Area: 549 acres (222 ha)
- Elevation: 3,600 ft (1,100 m)
- Opened: 1970
- Operator: Utah State Parks
- Visitors: 109,636 (in 2025)
- Website: Official website
- Utah State Parks

Gunlock State Park is a state park of Utah, United States, adjoining the 266-acre (108 ha) Gunlock Reservoir that impounds the Santa Clara River. The park is located approximately 15 miles (24 km) northwest of St George. The reservoir dam was constructed in 1970 for irrigation water and flood control.

Gunlock State Park is a primitive area; there are facilities. The park offers camping, swimming, boating, and fishing. The park and reservoir are named after the nearby community of Gunlock. The town was named after William "Gunlock Will" Hamblin, its first settler. Hamblin was a Mormon pioneer born in Ohio who settled in the area in 1857. Gunlock Will was a good hunter and sharpshooter, and was skillful in repairing gunlocks, which are the firing mechanisms for muzzleloaders.

The county road to the park is the Old Spanish Trail used by horsemen and raiders from Santa Fe, New Mexico to Los Angeles, California from the 1820s until 1849, when the gold fields of California became the destination and a shorter route was taken.
