= Newcastle, Utah =

- Census-designated place
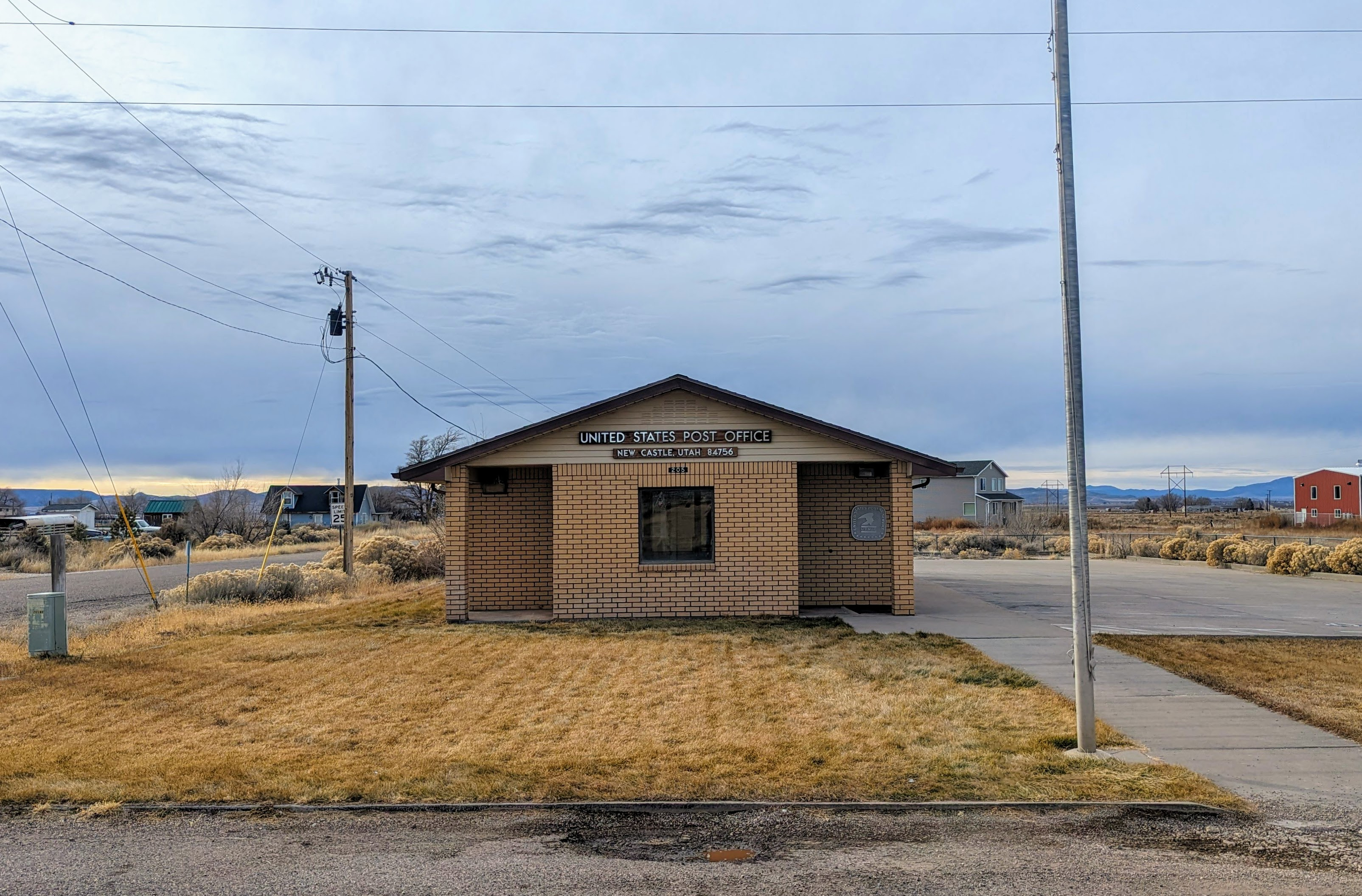
- Post office in Newcastle

- Location in Iron County and the state of Utah
- Coordinates: 37°39′46″N 113°33′52″W
- Country: United States
- State: Utah
- County: Iron
- Newcastle: 1910

Area
  - Total: 4.0 sq mi (10.3 km^{2})
  - Land: 4.0 sq mi (10.3 km^{2})
  - Water: 0 sq mi (0.0 km^{2})
- Elevation: 5,259 ft (1,603 m)

Population (2020)
  - Total: 330
  - Density: 83/sq mi (32/km^{2})
- Time zone: UTC-7 (Mountain (MST))
  - Summer (DST): UTC-6 (MDT)
- ZIP code: 84756
- Area code: 435
- FIPS code: 49-54330
- GNIS feature ID: 2629952

Newcastle (also New Castle) is an unincorporated community and census-designated place (CDP) in southwestern Iron County, Utah, United States. It lies along State Route 56, 30 miles (48 km) west of Cedar City. Newcastle has a post office with the ZIP code of 84756. The population was 330 at the 2020 census. Newcastle was founded in 1910 by citizens of the more isolated Pinto.

Newcastle is a small farming community which has a dairy, orchard, greenhouses producing house plants and tomatoes, and several fields. Crops produced include wheat, oats, alfalfa, corn and potatoes.

== Demographics ==
Historical population
Census	Pop.	Note	%±
2010	247		—
2020	330		33.6%

The 2010 census reported 247 people and 92 housing units in the CDP. The 2010 census reported racial makeup was 88.7% White, 0.4% American Indian and Alaska Native, and 10.9% other races. Hispanic or Latino heritage comprised 19.0% of the population.

== Climate ==
According to the Köppen Climate Classification system, Newcastle has a semi-arid climate, abbreviated "BSk" on climate maps.

== See also ==
- List of census-designated places in Utah
