= Modena, Utah =

Unincorporated community in the state of Utah, United States

- Census-designated place
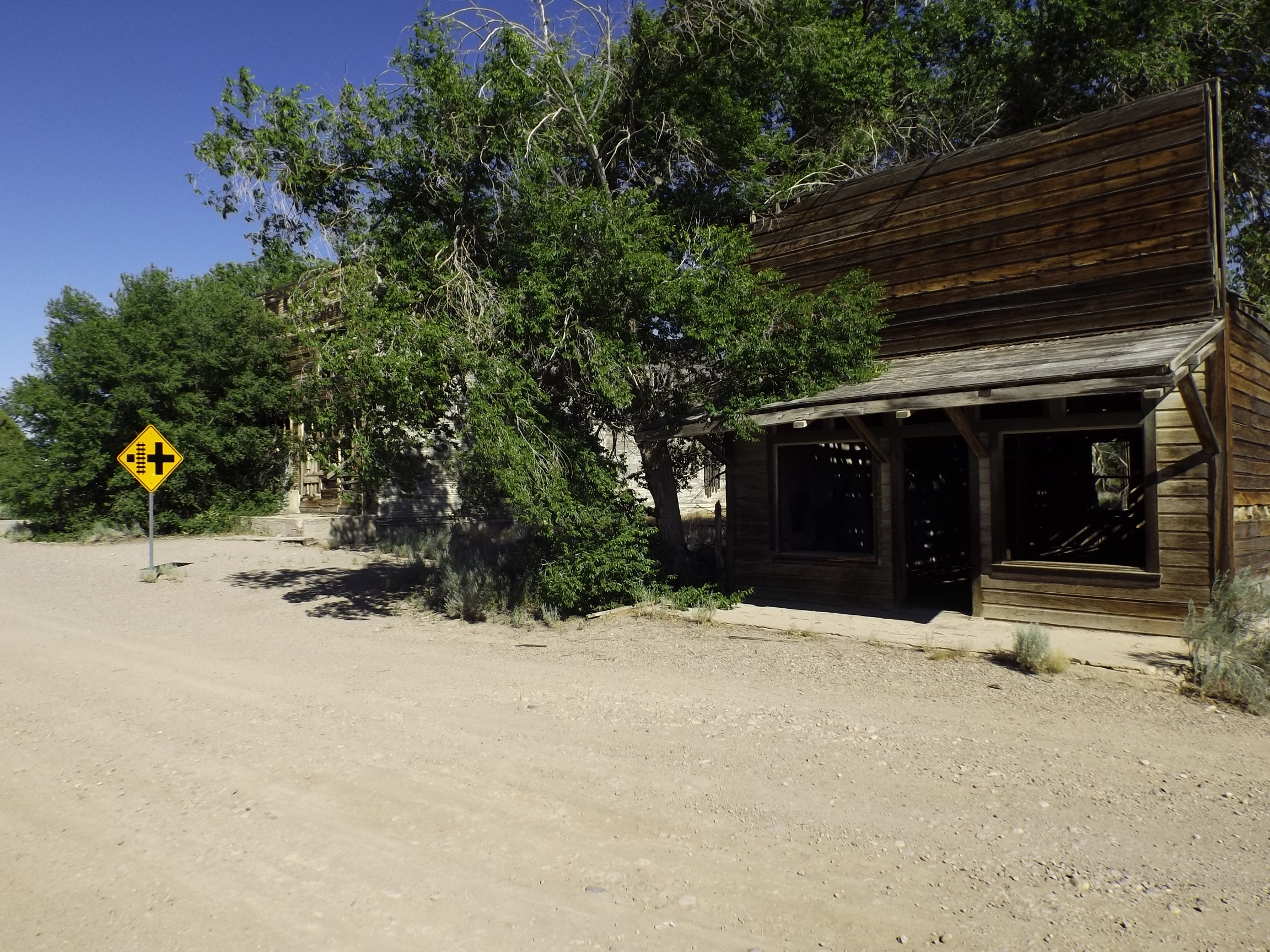
- Abandoned buildings in Modena

- Location within Utah Location within the United States
- Coordinates: 37°47′41″N 113°55′39″W
- Country: United States
- State: Utah
- County: Iron
- Established: 1899
- Named for: Modena, Italy
- Elevation: 5,466 ft (1,666 m)

Population (2020)
  - Total: 15
- Time zone: UTC-7 (Mountain (MST))
  - Summer (DST): UTC-6 (MDT)
- ZIP codes: 84753
- GNIS feature ID: 2629951

Modena is an unincorporated community and Census-designated place in far western Iron County, near the Nevada border in southwestern Utah, United States. The population as of the 2020 census was 15.

== Geography ==
The settlement lies along State Route 56 west of the city of Parowan, the county seat of Iron County. Its elevation is 5,476 feet (1,669 m).

Modena has a post office with the ZIP code of 84753.

The Righteous Branch of the Church of Jesus Christ of Latter-day Saints, a polygamous sect, is based near Modena.

== History ==
The settlement was established as a railroad town in 1899 by the Utah and Nevada Railway. By 1905 it was on the Los Angeles and Salt Lake Railroad route between Salt Lake City and Southern California.

== Climate ==
According to the Köppen Climate Classification system, Modena has a cold semi-arid climate, abbreviated "BSk" on climate maps.

Climate data for Modena, Utah
Month	Jan	Feb	Mar	Apr	May	Jun	Jul	Aug	Sep	Oct	Nov	Dec	Year
Mean daily maximum °F (°C)	42.4 (5.8)	47.6 (8.7)	55.5 (13.1)	64.7 (18.2)	74.2 (23.4)	85.1 (29.5)	91.4 (33.0)	88.7 (31.5)	81.3 (27.4)	69.7 (20.9)	54.0 (12.2)	44.0 (6.7)	66.5 (19.2)
Mean daily minimum °F (°C)	14.6 (−9.7)	19.6 (−6.9)	23.8 (−4.6)	29.6 (−1.3)	37.1 (2.8)	45.3 (7.4)	53.2 (11.8)	52.0 (11.1)	43.1 (6.2)	32.2 (0.1)	22.4 (−5.3)	15.3 (−9.3)	32.4 (0.2)
Average precipitation inches (mm)	0.80 (20)	0.88 (22)	1.01 (26)	0.79 (20)	0.70 (18)	0.39 (9.9)	1.06 (27)	1.37 (35)	0.89 (23)	1.02 (26)	0.69 (18)	0.66 (17)	10.26 (261)
Source: Western Regional Climate Center

== Population ==
Historical population
Census	Pop.	Note	%±
1910	49		—
1920	129		163.3%
1930	131		1.6%
1940	175		33.6%
1950	130		−25.7%
2020	15		—
Source: U.S. Census Bureau

== See also ==
- Nevada State Route 319
