= Snow Canyon State Park =

State park in Utah, United States

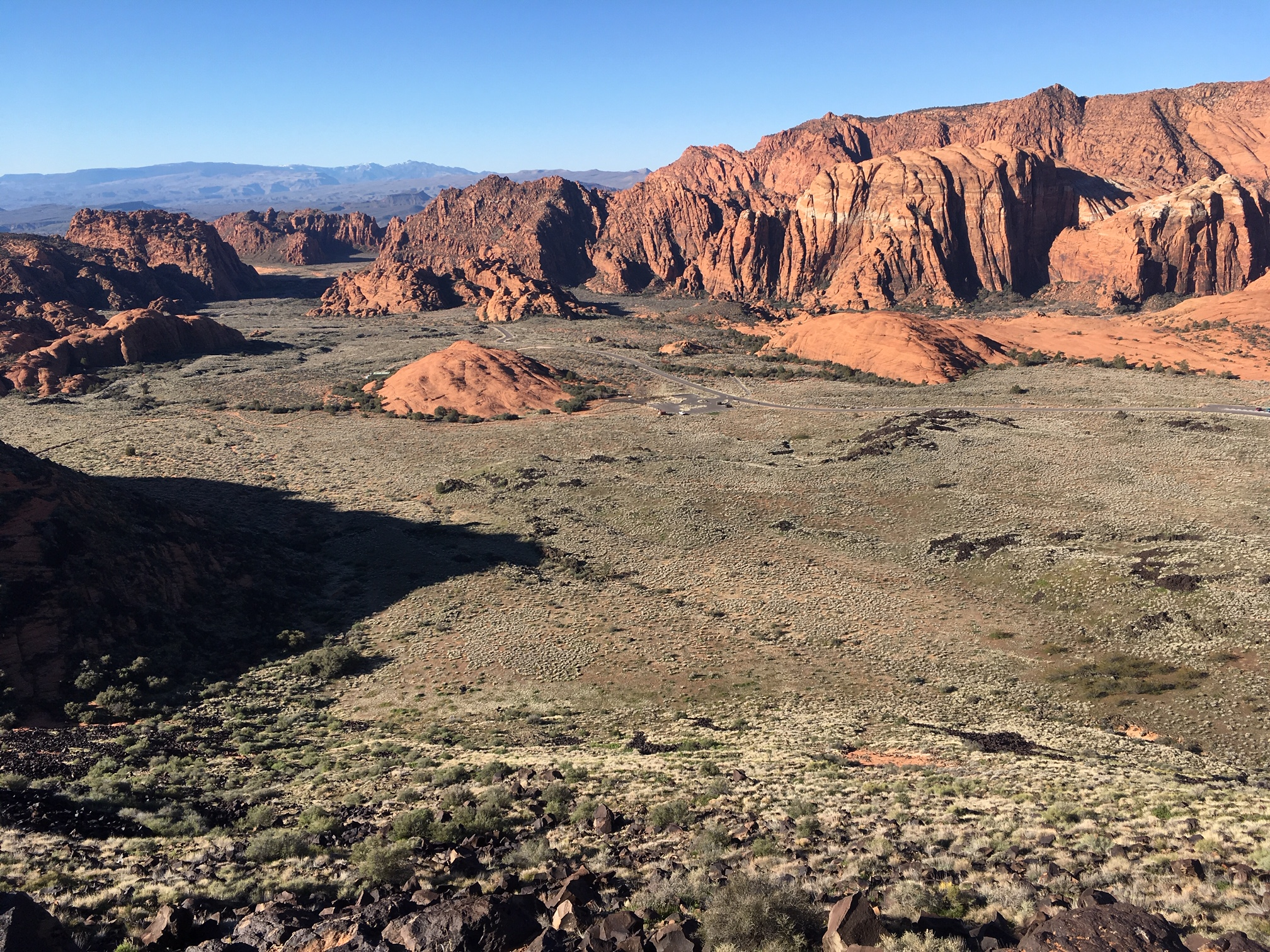

- Location within Utah Location within the United States
- Interactive map of Snow Canyon State Park
- Location: Washington County, Utah, United States
- Coordinates: 37°12′11″N 113°38′29″W
- Area: 7,400 acres (3,000 ha)
- Elevation: 3,100–4,100 ft (940–1,250 m)
- Created: 1959; opened 1962
- Operator: Utah State Parks
- Visitors: 757,457 (in 2025)
- Named for: Lorenzo and Erastus Snow
- Website: Official website

Snow Canyon State Park is a state park in Utah, located in the Red Cliffs Desert Reserve. The park features a canyon carved from the red and white Navajo sandstone of the Red Mountains, as well as the extinct Santa Clara Volcano, lava tubes, lava flows, and sand dunes. Snow Canyon is located near the cities of Ivins and St. George in Washington County.

== Description ==
Snow Canyon State Park contains several sandstone canyons cut in the Red Mountains. On the north end of the park, West Canyon and Snow Canyon follow a parallel southward path and converge in the middle of the park. The park then continues south-by-southeastward as a single, larger canyon, that opens near the park's southern entrance out onto the Santa Clara bench near Ivins, Utah.

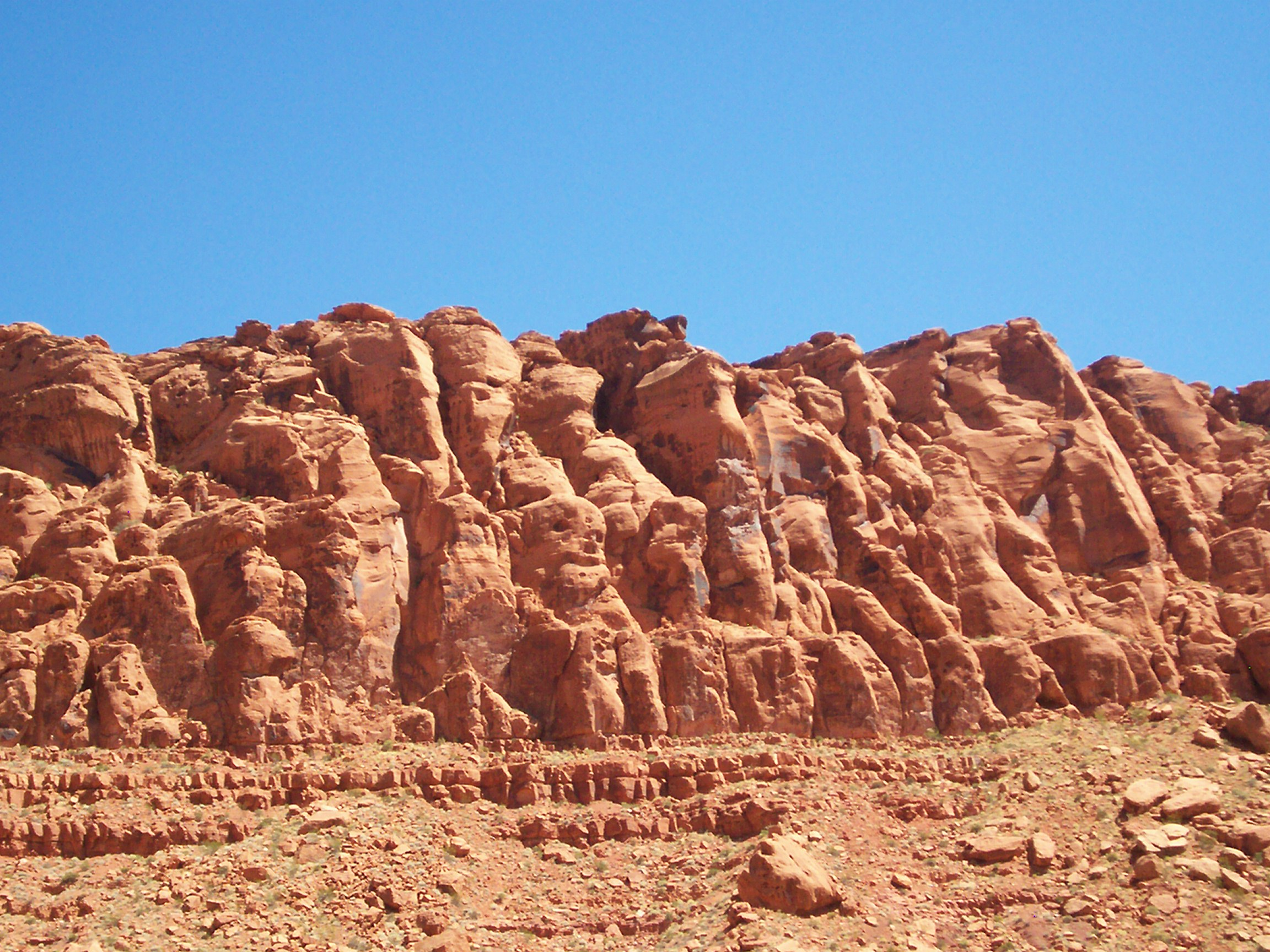
Red rock formations are a major feature of the canyon.

A paved two-lane road (formerly SR-300) enters the park from Ivins on the south, winds up the canyon, then climbs the eastern edge to the bench above Snow Canyon. There the road joins State Route 18. The park boundaries extend northeastward across State Route 18 to encompass two cinder cones along the western edge of Diamond Valley.

The highest point in the park, according to a U.S. Geological Survey topographical map, is a 5,024-foot (1,531 m) peak west of the southern cinder cone, above the eastern edge of the east fork of Snow Canyon.

== Park Facilities ==
Snow Canyon State Park is used for activities such as hiking, mountain biking, and horseback riding, and is open year-round. It contains 17 multi-use campsites and 14 sites for RVs. The Johnson Canyon trail, which leads to a large arch, may be accessed without payment of fees, but is closed to hikers most of the year for wildlife and habitat protection. The Johnson Canyon trail is usually open from October to March.

== Climate ==
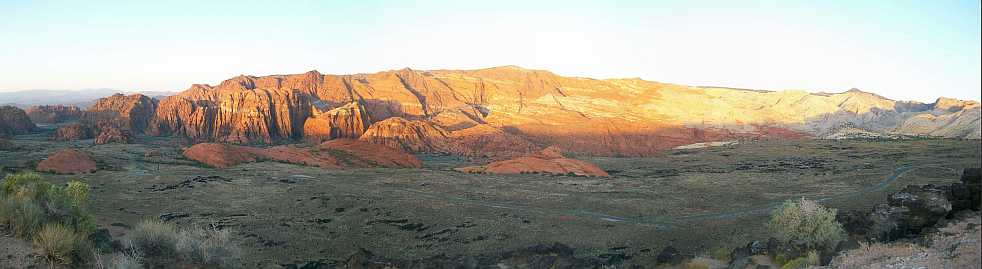
Morning breaks over Snow Canyon State Park. Picture taken from an overlook just off of Utah State Route 18

Snow Canyon sits at the junction of the Mojave Desert, Great Basin, and Colorado Plateau. The desert climate means the canyon receives little rainfall, averaging 7.5 inches per year, and can experience very high summer temperatures. The average temperature in the nearby town of Ivins shows summer low temperatures of around 68 °F (20 °C) and highs of 101 °F (38 °C). Winters experience average lows around 30 °F (−1 °C) and highs around 55 °F (13 °C).

== History ==
Snow Canyon has had human activity since the 5th century BC. From AD 200 to 1250, Ancestral Puebloans inhabited the nearby region, utilizing the canyon for hunting and gathering. Southern Paiute used the canyon from AD 1200 to the mid-19th century. According to local stories, Mormon pioneers first came upon Snow Canyon in the 1850s while looking for lost cattle.

Snow Canyon was designated a state park in 1958, and was one of the first inclusions in the state park system, created the year before. In 1959, the area of the park grew from the donation of 296 acres from Washington County to the State Parks Commission, and was subsequently increased with the purchases of nearby ranches. Originally called Dixie State Park, it was later renamed for Lorenzo and Erastus Snow, prominent pioneering Utah leaders.

The park was first opened to the public in 1962. During the 1960s the park continued to grow via additional land purchases as well as the transfer of nearly 4,000 acres of federal land from the Bureau of Land Management to the State of Utah.

== In popular culture ==
Many Hollywood films have been filmed at least partly in Snow Canyon. These include The Conqueror (1956) starring John Wayne, The King and Four Queens (1956), Butch Cassidy and the Sundance Kid (1969), The Electric Horseman (1979), Jeremiah Johnson (1972), Run of the Arrow (1957), They Came to Cordura (1959), The Appaloosa (1966), Six Black Horses (1962), Bullet for a Badman (1964), Gunpoint (1966), The Flintstones (1994), and High School Musical 2 (2007).

== Flora and fauna ==
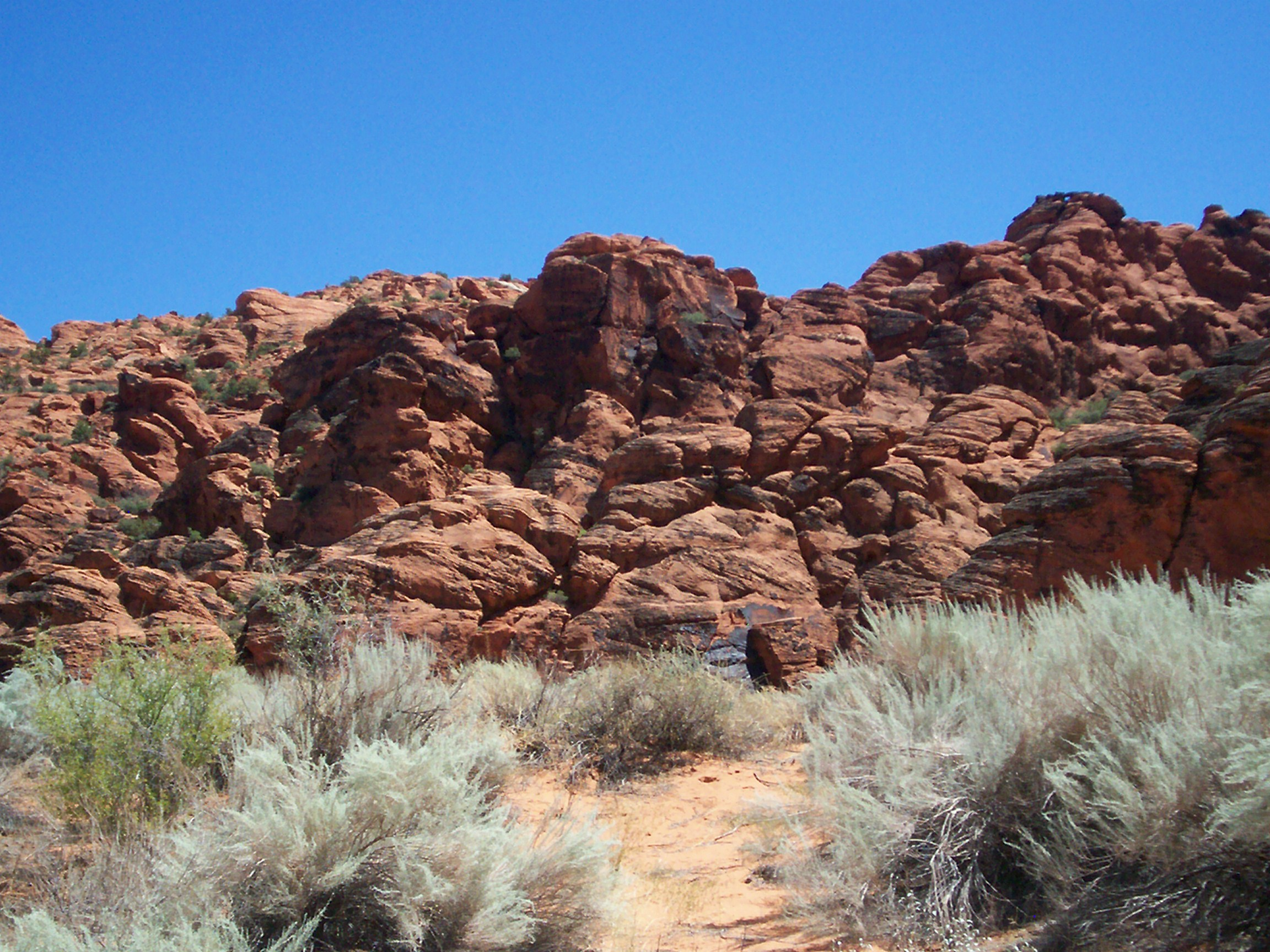
Various types of desert shrubs are found in the park against the rock formations

Snow canyon is home to several mammal species, including coyotes, kit foxes, antelope ground squirrels, and bobcat. Common birds in the park are greater roadrunners, common ravens, Bewick's and canyon wren, and Gambel's quail. The park is also home to lizards, snakes, and amphibians, including desert spiny lizards and canyon tree frogs. There are thirteen sensitive species protected by law within the park, including peregrine falcons, desert tortoises, and gila monsters. Small fences to keep the ground-dwelling creatures from accidentally wandering onto roads can be seen across Snow Canyon.

Plants in the park include the desert species creosote, narrow-leaf yucca, pinyon pine, shrub live oak, desert almond, Mormon tea, strawberry hedgehog cactus, among others. Wildflower blooms are visible in fall and spring, when conditions are right.

== Trails ==
Whiptail Trail - 6 miles (9.7 km). Easy. Level with some slopes. Accessible to physically challenged. Tucked along the canyon bottom, this sinuous paved trail is suitable for hiking, jogging, biking and rollerblading.

Johnson Canyon - (Open November 15 to March 1 only) - 2 miles (3.2 km). Easy. Level with some rocky slopes and steps. Boasting the only riparian area in the park, this trail winds through lava flows and red rock to an arch spanning 200 feet (61 m).

Jenny's Canyon - (Closed March 31 to June 1) - 0.5 miles (0.80 km). Easy, level with few slopes and steps. Trail leads to a narrow, sculpted canyon then splits with rock stairsteps to offer a scenic overlook.

Sand Dunes - 0.5 miles (0.80 km). Easy. Deep sand with some slopes. Trail leads to a large expanse of red sand that is an excellent play area for children of all ages.

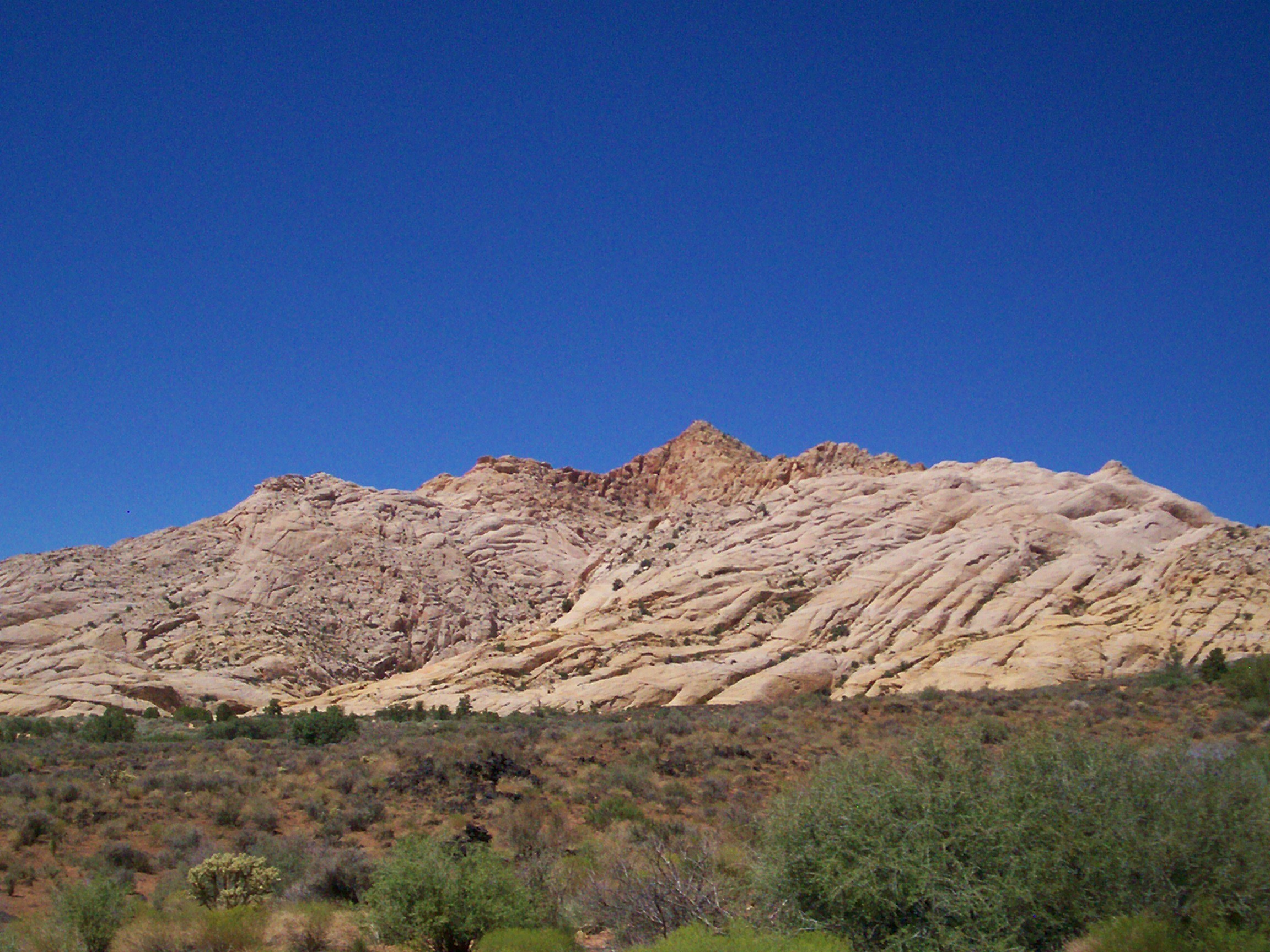
White Navajo Sandstone petrified sand dune.

West Canyon Road - 7 miles (11 km). Easy. Gravel and sand surface. Fairly level. Trail follows a maintenance road winding past washes and towering cliffs to the mouth of present-day Snow Canyon.

Pioneer Names - 0.5 miles (0.80 km). Easy. Fairly level with some steps and slopes. This crescent-shaped trail passes pioneer names written in axle grease, dating back to 1883.

Hidden Pinyon - 1.5 miles (2.4 km). Moderate. Rocky slopes. Drop-offs. This self-guided nature trail introduces geological features and native plants of the park.

Three Ponds - 3.5 miles (5.6 km). Moderate. Some rocky slopes. Deep sand. Trail winds through sandy washes to mouth of a 400-foot (120 m) canyon. Potholes eroded in sandstone catch seasonal rain, giving the trail its name.

Petrified Dunes Trail - 1-mile (1.6 km). Moderate. Some steep slopes, uneven surfaces. This trail crosses massive sandstone outcrops where you may explore sand dunes frozen in time.

Butterfly Trail - 2 miles (3.2 km). Moderate. Some steep slopes, steps and uneven surfaces. Winding along the west side of Petrified Dunes, this trail leads to West Canyon Overlook and lava tubes.

White Rocks Trail/Lava Flow Overlook - 4 miles (6.4 km). Moderate. Some rocky slopes, uneven surfaces. Passing through lava flows, juniper stands and views of West Canyon, trail leads to a natural amphitheater set in white sandstone. Or reach the amphitheater on a 1-mile (1.6 km) trail located one-half mile north of State Route 18 junction.

Panorama of Snow Canyon
