= List of museums in Utah =

This list of museums in Utah encompasses museums defined for this context as institutions (including nonprofit organizations, government entities, and private businesses) that collect and care for objects of cultural, artistic, scientific, or historical interest and make their collections or related exhibits available for public viewing. Also included are non-profit and university art galleries. (Websites are listed for museums with no existing articles.) Museums that exist only in cyberspace (i.e., virtual museums) are not included.

== Museums ==
Name	Image	Town/city	County	Area of study	Summary
Alf Engen Ski Museum		Park City	Summit	Sports	Ski equipment and memorabilia, 2002 Winter Olympics
Alice Gallery		Salt Lake City	Salt Lake	Art	website, works by Utah artists, operated by the Utah Arts Council at the Glendinning Mansion
American Fork DUP Museum		American Fork	Utah	History	Operated by the Daughters of Utah Pioneers, local history and historic cabin
American West Heritage Center		Wellsville	Cache	Open air	website, four themed areas: Shoshone encampment, Mountain man camp, pioneer family settlement, 1917 farm, summer living history programs, Cache Valley Cultural History Museum
Anasazi State Park Museum		Boulder	Garfield	Native American	Ancient Native American village and museum with excavated artifacts
Arches National Park		Moab	Grand	Natural history	Visitor center exhibits about the geology, prehistory and natural history of the park
Monte L. Bean Life Science Museum		Provo	Utah	Natural history	Part of Brigham Young University, dioramas and displays of animals, birds, butterflies, shells
Bear River City DUP Museum		Bear River City	Box Elder	History	Operated by the Daughters of Utah Pioneers, historic log cabin, open by appointment
Beaver DUP Court House Museum		Beaver	Beaver	History	Operated by the Daughters of Utah Pioneers, historic courthouse with pioneer relics
Beehive House		Salt Lake City	Salt Lake	Historic house	Official residence of Brigham Young and family
Benson Grist Mill		Stansbury Park	Tooele	Open air	Late 19th-century grist mill, blacksmith shop and pioneer cabin
Bicknell DUP Museum		Bicknell	Wayne	History	Operated by the Daughters of Utah Pioneers, pioneer artifacts, open by appointment
Big Water Visitor Center		Big Water	Kane	Natural history	Interprets the fossils and geology of the Grand Staircase–Escalante National Monument area, operated by the Bureau of Land Management
Bingham Canyon Mine Visitors Center		Bingham Canyon	Salt Lake	Mining	Overlook and exhibits about the Bingham Canyon Mine, a copper mine
Bluff Fort		Bluff	San Juan	Open air	Original and replica buildings of the town's first settlement
Bountiful Davis Art Center		Bountiful	Davis	Art	Regional community art center
Bountiful Historical Museum		Bountiful	Davis	History	website, local history, operated by the Bountiful Historical Preservation Foundation
Box Elder County DUP Cabin		Brigham City	Box Elder	History	Operated by the Daughters of Utah Pioneers, pioneer artifacts in a restored log cabin
Box Elder Museum		Brigham City	Box Elder	Natural History	website, fossils and minerals from Box Elder County and around the world
Brathwaite Fine Arts Gallery		Cedar City	Iron	Art	website, part of Southern Utah University, located on the ground floor in the Braithwaite Liberal Arts Center building
Brigham City Museum-Gallery		Brigham City	Box Elder	Multiple	Historic period room displays, changing exhibits of art, photography and culture
Brigham Young University Museum of Art		Provo	Utah	Art	Collections emphasis on American art from the late 18th century to the present, including painting, photography, prints and sculpture
Brigham Young Winter Home and Office		St. George	Washington	Historic house	Mid-19th-century period home of Brigham Young
Browning-Kimball Classic Car Museum		Ogden	Weber	Automotive	website, located in Union Station, auto examples of the Golden Age of motorcar history, antique gas station pumps, model cars, Utah license plates
Bryce Canyon National Park		Bryce	Garfield	Natural history	Visitor center exhibits about the geology, plants and wildlife of the park
Bryce Museum		Bryce	Garfield	Natural history	website, wildlife dioramas of animals from around the world
BYU Legacy Hall		Provo	Utah	Sports	website, Brigham Young University athletes, trophies, uniforms, memorabilia
BYU Museum of Paleontology		Provo	Utah	Natural history	Part of Brigham Young University, dinosaurs, fossils, rocks, minerals
Cache County DUP Museum		Logan	Cache	History	Operated by the Daughters of Utah Pioneers, mountain man and early pioneer relics
CAF Utah Wing Air Museum		Heber City	Wasatch	Aviation	WW II and other historic aircraft and WW II artifacts and displays, formerly the Heber Valley Aero Museum, operated by the Commemorative Air Force Utah Wing
Camp Belknap DUP Museum		Elsinore	Sevier	Historic house	Operated by the Daughters of Utah Pioneers, open by appointment
Camp Christine DUP Cabin		Redmond	Sevier	Historic house	Operated by the Daughters of Utah Pioneers, open by appointment, pioneer log cabin
Camp Clear Creek DUP Museum		Joseph	Sevier	Historic house	Operated by the Daughters of Utah Pioneers, open by appointment, pioneer log cabin
Camp Floyd / Stagecoach Inn State Park and Museum		Fairfield	Utah	Military	Mid-19th-century U.S. Army post
Cannonville Visitor Center		Cannonville	Garfield	History	Operated by the Bureau of Land Management, natural and cultural history of the Grand Staircase–Escalante National Monument area
Capitol Reef National Park		Torrey	Wayne	Multiple	Includes visitor center exhibits about the park's natural and cultural history, Fruita Schoolhouse and Gifford Homestead
Cedar City DUP Museum		Cedar City	Iron	History	Operated by the Daughters of Utah Pioneers, pioneer artifacts
Centerville Cabin DUP Museum		Centerville	Davis	Historic house	Operated by the Daughters of Utah Pioneers, log cabin, open twice a year and by appointment
CUAC		Salt Lake City	Salt Lake	Art	website, artist-run contemporary art center
Charles Penrose Cabin DUP Museum		Farmington	Davis	Historic house	Operated by the Daughters of Utah Pioneers, historic cabin, open by appointment
Chase Home Museum of Utah Folk Arts		Salt Lake City	Salt Lake	Art	Native American, ethnic, rural folk art from Utah
Chieftain Museum		Santaquin	Utah	History	website, local history, period room and business displays, located in a former high school
Church History Museum		Salt Lake City	Salt Lake	Religious	Formerly the Museum of Church History and Art, history of the Church of Jesus Christ of Latter-day Saints
Clark Planetarium		Salt Lake City	Salt Lake	Science	Science and astronomy exhibits, planetarium and IMAX theater
Classic Cars International		Salt Lake City	Salt Lake	Automotive	website, automobile showroom and museum
Cleveland-Lloyd Dinosaur Quarry		Cleveland	Emery	Natural history	Working dinosaur quarry and visitor center
Corrine Historical Society Museum		Corinne	Box Elder	History	information, local history, open by appointment
Cove Fort		Cove Fort	Millard	History	Restored mid-19th-century fort, stagecoach stop and cabin
Covey Center for the Arts		Provo	Utah	Art	website, performing arts center with art gallery
Crandall Historical Printing Museum		Provo	Utah	Media	website, different methods of printing and its impact on society, founded by Louis E. Crandall
Dan O'Laurie Museum of Moab		Moab	Grand	Multiple	website, local history, prehistoric artifacts, fossils, uranium mining and minerals
Daughters of Utah Pioneers Museum		Provo	Utah	History	Operated by the Daughters of Utah Pioneers, local history
Daughters of Utah Pioneers Museum and Log Cabin		Tooele	Tooele	History	Operated by the Daughters of Utah Pioneers, local history, pioneer artifacts, log cabin, adjacent to the Tooele Pioneer Museum
David O. McKay Home		Huntsville	Weber	Historic house	
Delta DUP Museum		Delta	Millard	Historic house	Operated by the Daughters of Utah Pioneers, McCullough Log Cabin, open by appointment
The Dinosaur Museum		Blanding	San Juan	Natural history	website, dinosaur sculptures, fossils, skeletons, eggs, footprints
Dinosaur National Monument		Vernal	Uintah	Natural history	Dinosaur fossils
Discovery Gateway		Salt Lake City	Salt Lake	Children's	Formerly the Children's Museum of Utah
Donner-Reed Pioneer Museum		Grantsville	Tooele	History	Operated by the Daughters of Utah Pioneers, open by appointment, artifacts of the Donner Party
Draper Historical Society Museum		Draper	Salt Lake	History	website, local history
Eccles Dinosaur Park		Ogden	Weber	Natural history	website, dinosaur museum, life-sized sculptures and working laboratory
Echo Church & Museum		Echo	Summit	History	Operated by the Daughters of Utah Pioneers
Edge of the Cedars State Park Museum		Blanding	San Juan	Native American	Includes Anasazi pottery and artifacts, ruins of an authentic Puebloan village, changing exhibits of art, photography and culture
Emery County Pioneer Museum		Castle Dale	Emery	History	Period room displays, pioneer artifacts
Escalante DUP Camp Museum		Escalante	Garfield	History	Operated by the Daughters of Utah Pioneers, open by appointment
Escalante Interagency Visitor Center		Escalante	Garfield	Natural history	Operated by the Bureau of Land Management, natural and cultural history of the Grand Staircase–Escalante National Monument area
Fairview Museum of History and Art		Fairview	Sanpete	Multiple	website, local history, natural history, art, fossils, antique collections
Fanny Powell Cropper DUP Museum		Delta	Millard	Historic house	Operated by the Daughters of Utah Pioneers,
Farmington Historical Museum		Farmington	Davis	History	Local history, operated by the Farmington Historical Society
Fielding Garr Ranch		Syracuse	Davis	Historic house	Part of Antelope Island State Park, historic ranch and outbuildings
Finch Lane Gallery		Salt Lake City	Salt Lake	Art	website, operated by the Salt Lake City Arts Council in the Art Barn
Fine Arts Center		Brigham City	Box Elder	Puppetry	website, includes The World of Puppetry Museum
Fort Buenaventura		Ogden	Weber	Military	Replicas of the 19th-century stockade and cabins
Fort Douglas Military Museum		Salt Lake City	Salt Lake	Military	History of the mid-19th-century military garrison and Utah military history
Fountain Green DUP Museum & Old Tithing House		Fountain Green	Sanpete	History	Operated by the Daughters of Utah Pioneers, open by appointment
Francis DUP Museum		Francis	Summit	History	Operated by the Daughters of Utah Pioneers,
Fremont DUP Museum		Fremont	Wayne	History	Operated by the Daughters of Utah Pioneers, pioneer artifacts, open by appointment
Fremont Indian State Park and Museum			Sevier	Native American	Artifacts, petroglyphs, and pictographs of the Fremont culture
Frontier Homestead State Park Museum		Cedar City	Iron	Open air	Formerly Iron Mission State Park Museum, pioneer iron mining and industry, farming equipment, pioneer household, historic cabins
Gale Center of History & Culture		South Jordan	Salt Lake	Multiple	website, includes period home and business displays, household items, quilts, dugout, granary, farm machinery
Gallery East		Price	Carbon	Art	website, part of the Utah State University Eastern
George F. Freestone Boy Scout Museum		Provo	Utah	Scouting	May no longer exist
Glenwood DUP Museum		Glenwood	Sevier	Historic house	Operated by the Daughters of Utah Pioneers, open by appointment, pioneer log cabin
Golden Spike National Historic Site		Promontory	Box Elder	Railroad	Commemorates the completion of the first transcontinental railroad
Goulding's Lodge		Oljato-Monument Valley	San Juan	History	Historic lodge, restaurant and gift shop, with museum in the original trading post about the area and its history
Grantsville DUP Museum		Grantsville	Tooele	History	website, located in the J. Reuben Clark Home, local history and pioneer artifacts
Great Basin Museum		Delta	Millard	Multiple	Local history, geology, fossils, prehistory, Topaz War Relocation Center exhibit
Hatch DUP Museum		Hatch	Garfield	History	Operated by the Daughters of Utah Pioneers, open by appointment
Hellenic Cultural Museum		Salt Lake City	Salt Lake	Ethnic	Greek culture and immigration in Utah, operated by the Hellenic Cultural Association in Holy Trinity Cathedral
Henefer DUP Museum		Henefer	Summit	History	Operated by the Daughters of Utah Pioneers, pioneer cabin with historic artifacts
Heritage Museum of Layton		Layton	Davis	History	website, local history
Highland DUP Museum		Highland	Utah	History	Operated by the Daughters of Utah Pioneers, pioneer cabin and artifacts, open by appointment
Hill Aerospace Museum		Hill Air Force Base	Weber	Aerospace	U.S. Air Force museum with historic aircraft, munitions, equipment, vehicles
Historic Pioneer Relic Hall DUP Museum		Alpine	Utah	History	Operated by the Daughters of Utah Pioneers, local history
Historic Wendover Airfield		Wendover	Tooele	Aviation	History of Wendover Air Force Base
Hogan Cabin DUP Museum		Woods Cross	Davis	Historic house	Operated by the Daughters of Utah Pioneers, open by appointment, log cabin with pioneer furnishings
Huck's Museum and Trading Post		Blanding	San Juan	Native American	Includes arrowheads, beads, pendants, and pottery of the Anasazi culture
Hurricane Valley Pioneer Heritage Park and Museum		Hurricane	Washington	History	Local history
Hutchings Museum of Natural and Cultural History		Lehi	Utah	Multiple	website, includes Western history, rocks, minerals, fossils, shells, stuffed birds, eggs, Native American artifacts, pioneer items, and Wild West guns and memorabilia
Hyrum City Museum		Hyrum	Cache	History	website, local history
International Model Car Builders' Museum		Salt Lake City	Salt Lake	Sports	website, information, open by appointment, displays model cars tracing the development of craftsmanship and history of the hobby
Jacob Hamblin House		Santa Clara	Washington	Historic house	Early 19th-century period home of Mormon pioneer Jacob Hamblin
John Carver Cabin/Plain City DUP Museum		Plain City	Weber	History	Operated by the Daughters of Utah Pioneers, open by appointment, pioneer artifacts
John Jarvie Ranch		Browns Park	Daggett	Historic house	website, information, late 19th-century ranch and outbuildings, operated by the Bureau of Land Management in Browns Park
John M. Browning Firearms Museum		Ogden	Weber	Military	website, weapons, located in Union Station, features original models of firearms designed by John M. Browning including rifles, shotguns, pistols, machine guns and cannons
John Patten DUP Museum		Manti	Sanpete	Historic house	website, operated by the Daughters of Utah Pioneers, open by appointment
John Wesley Powell River History Museum		Green River	Emery	Multiple	website, early Indians, mountain men, explorers, river rafter's hall of fame, art gallery
Juab County DUP Museum		Nephi	Juab	History	Operated by the Daughters of Utah Pioneers
Island in the Sky Visitor Center		Moab	Grand	Natural history	Geology, natural history of Canyonlands National Park
Kamas DUP Museum		Kamas	Summit	History	Operated by the Daughters of Utah Pioneers, open by appointment
Kanab Heritage Museum		Kanab	Kane	History	website, includes late 19th-century Heritage House, museum with pioneer and Native American artifacts, household items, photos, kitchen items, quilts, clothing, textiles, toys and dolls, military uniforms and artifacts
Kanab Visitor Center		Kanab	Kane	History	Operated by the Bureau of Land Management, archaeology and geology of the Grand Staircase–Escalante National Monument area
Kimball Art Center		Park City	Summit	Art	website
Laketown DUP Relic Hall		Laketown	Rich	History	Operated by the Daughters of Utah Pioneers, open by appointment
Lehi DUP Museum		Lehi	Utah	History	Operated by the Daughters of Utah Pioneers, open by appointment
The Leonardo		Salt Lake City	Salt Lake	Multiple	Science, art and culture
Levan DUP Museum		Levan	Juab	History	Operated by the Daughters of Utah Pioneers
Lewiston-Wheeler Log Cabin		Lewiston	Cache	Historic house	Operated by the Daughters of Utah Pioneers, open by appointment
Loa DUP Museum		Loa	Wayne	History	Operated by the Daughters of Utah Pioneers, pioneer artifacts, open by appointment
Magna Ethnic & Mining Museum		Magna	Salt Lake	Ethnic	website, minority stories of Utah's mine workers and European transplants, located in a restored JCPenney building
Mapleton Heritage Museum		Mapleton	Utah	History	Local history, open by appointment
Mary Elizabeth Dee Shaw Gallery		Ogden	Weber	Art	website, part of Weber State University, located in the Kimball Visual Arts Building, contemporary art of local, regional, and nationally recognized artists, including new work
Maynard Dixon Summer Home and Studio		Mount Carmel	Kane	Historic house	Home and studio of artist Maynard Dixon
McQuarrie Pioneer Museum		St. George	Washington	History	website, operated by the Daughters of Utah Pioneers, local history
Midvale Museum		Midvale	Salt Lake	History	Local history, operated by the Midvale Historical Society
Midway DUP Museum		Heber City	Wasatch	History	Operated by the Daughters of Utah Pioneers, open by appointment
Miller Motorsports Park		Erda	Tooele	Automotive	Includes the Larry H. Miller Total Performance Museum with classic cars and vintage racing cars, posters, memorabilia
Moab DUP Museum		Moab	Grand	History	Operated by the Daughters of Utah Pioneers, local history
Moab Museum of Film and Western Heritage		Moab	Grand	Media	website, located at the Red Cliffs Lodge where many movies were shot, features early cowboy ranching and local movie memorabilia
Monticello DUP Museum		Monticello	San Juan	History	Operated by the Daughters of Utah Pioneers
Monticello Frontier Museum		Monticello	San Juan	History	Local history
Monroe DUP Museum		Monroe	Sevier	Historic house	Operated by the Daughters of Utah Pioneers, open by appointment, 1886 William Cordingley Cabin
Moqui Cave		Kanab	Kane	Natural history	Cave and museum with fluorescent minerals, Native American artifacts and dinosaur tracks, gift shop
Morgan County DUP Museum		Morgan	Morgan	History	Operated by the Daughters of Utah Pioneers, open by appointment
Mt. Nebo Pioneer Memorial Relic Home		Mona	Juab	History	Operated by the Daughters of Utah Pioneers, historic log cabin, open by appointment
Mt. Pleasant Pioneer Museum & Relic Home		Mount Pleasant	Sanpete	Historic house	website
Murray City Museum		Murray	Salt Lake	History	website, local history
Museum of Mormon History of the Americas		Provo	Utah	Religious	website, history of Mormonism in Mexico
Museum of Ancient Life, Thanksgiving Point		Lehi	Utah	Natural history	Dinosaur skeletons, fossils, rocks and minerals; part of Thanksgiving Point
Museum of Natural Curiosity, Thanksgiving Point		Lehi	Utah	Children's	Five exhibit areas: Rainforest, Waterworks, Kidopolis, Children's Discovery Garden, and Traveling Exhibits; part of Thanksgiving Point
Museum of Utah		Salt Lake City	Utah	History	Official state history museum, located at the Utah State Capitol Complex
Museum of Peoples and Cultures		Provo	Utah	Multiple	Brigham Young University's primary museum of anthropology, archaeology and ethnology
Museum of the San Rafael Swell		Castle Dale	Emery	Natural history	website, dinosaurs, wild animals, early humans
Myton Memories Museum		Myton	Duchesne	History	Local history, open by appointment
Natural History Museum of Utah		Salt Lake City	Salt Lake	Natural history	Part of the University of Utah, Utah's natural history and anthropology, including dinosaurs and fossils, gems and minerals, Utah's five First Nations, weather, climate, astronomy, geology
Nielsen's Grove Museum		Orem	Utah	Historic house	website, replica Danish pioneer home and park
Nora Eccles Harrison Museum of Art		Logan	Cache	Art	Part of Utah State University, focus is modern and contemporary art of the American West
Old Bell School DUP Museum & Log Cabin		Pleasant Grove	Utah	History	Operated by the Daughters of Utah Pioneers, local history
Ophir Historic District		Ophir	Tooele	Open air	Restored historic buildings, including homes, a post office, a train with period antiques, a shoe shop and an ore wagon
Oquirrh Mountain Mining Museum		Tooele	Tooele	Mining	website, part of the Deseret Peak Complex, open by appointment, old mines, current mines, and reclamation practices of area gold and copper mines
Orderville Kane County DUP Museum		Orderville	Kane	History	Operated by the Daughters of Utah Pioneers,
Orem Heritage Museum		Orem	Utah	History	website, local history, located in the SCERA Center for the Arts
Ott Planetarium		Ogden	Weber	Science	Part of Weber State University
Panguitch DUP Camp Museum		Panguitch	Garfield	History	Operated by the Daughters of Utah Pioneers
Park City Museum		Park City	Summit	History	website, local history
Parowan Old Rock Church Museum		Parowan	Iron	History	Operated by the Daughters of Utah Pioneers
Peteetneet Museum and Cultural Arts Center		Payson	Utah	Multiple	Local history, Victorian room displays, art, Western sculpture, clothing
Petrolania Museum		Provo	Utah	Automotive	Located at AAA Lakeside Storage, includes antique gas pumps, an antique Texaco Gas station, gas station signs, antique cars, automotive memorabilia
Pilot Peak DUP Museum		Enterprise	Washington	History	Operated by the Daughters of Utah Pioneers, open by appointment
Pioneer Memorial Museum		Salt Lake City	Salt Lake	History	Also known as the DUP Museum, main museum of the Daughters of Utah Pioneers
Pioneer Relic Hall DUP Museum		Richmond	Cache	History	Operated by the Daughters of Utah Pioneers, pioneer and Native American artifacts
Pioneer Village		Farmington	Davis	Open air	Part of Lagoon Amusement Park, reconstruction of a typical late 1800s frontier community
Pope House Museum		Duchesne	Duchesne	Historic house	
Price DUP Museum		Price	Carbon	History	Operated by the Daughters of Utah Pioneers, Leander and Grimes log cabins with historic artifacts, open by appointment
Provo Pioneers Village		Provo	Utah	Open air	website, pioneer buildings and furnishings, wagons, tools, farm implements, blacksmith shop and ox shoer
Randolph DUP Relic Hall		Randolph	Rich	History	Operated by the Daughters of Utah Pioneers, log home with historic artifacts
Richfield Pioneer Relic Hall		Richfield	Sevier	History	Operated by the Daughters of Utah Pioneers, open by appointment, log cabin with pioneer artifacts
Rio Gallery		Salt Lake City	Salt Lake	Art	Art, photography and crafts by Utah artists, operated by the Utah Arts Council in the lobby of the Rio Grande Station
Robert F. Aldous Cabin		Huntsville	Weber	Historic house	19th-century log cabin
Rosenbruch Wildlife Museum		St. George	Washington	Natural history	website, wildlife dioramas, insect collection, wildlife art gallery
Round Valley Camp DUP Museum		Scipio	Millard	History	Operated by the Daughters of Utah Pioneers, open by appointment
S&S Shortline Railroad Park & Museum		Farmington	Davis	Railroad	Features over 90 engines and rail cars, museum, two different gauge railroads to ride
Sagwich Camp Paradise DUP Museum		Paradise	Cache	History	Operated by the Daughters of Utah Pioneers, open by appointment
Salem DUP Museum		Salem	Utah	History	Operated by the Daughters of Utah Pioneers, log cabin, open by appointment
Salina Historical Museum		Salina	Sevier	History	information, local history
Salina Pioneer Relic Hall		Salina	Sevier	History	Operated by the Daughters of Utah Pioneers, open by appointment, pioneer artifacts
Sandy Museum		Sandy	Salt Lake	History	Local history, a look at life in the late 1800s. Admission is free.
Sears Art Museum Gallery		St. George	Washington	Art	website, part of Utah Tech University's Eccles Fine Arts Center, features six exhibits each year, offering a variety of art styles from traditional to contemporary
SEGO Art Center		Provo	Utah	Art	website
Silver Reef Museum		Silver Reef	Washington	History	Museum and tours of the late 19th-century ghost town
Snook's Dream Cars		Hanna	Duchesne	Automotive	website, recreated 1940s era Texaco gas station, showroom of automobile memorabilia and a car collection presented within period scenes ranging from a 1930s general store to a racetrack from the 1960s
Snow College Art Gallery		Ephraim	Sanpete	Art	
Sorensen Home Museum		Draper	Salt Lake	Historic house	website, 1890s period house
South County DUP Museum		Payson	Utah	History	Operated by the Daughters of Utah Pioneers
Spanish Fork DUP Museum		Spanish Fork	Utah	History	Operated by the Daughters of Utah Pioneers, local history
Spring City-Canal Creek DUP		Spring City	Sanpete	History	Operated by the Daughters of Utah Pioneers
Springville Museum of Art		Springville	Utah	Art	Focus is Utah art
Springville-Mapleton Pioneer Museum		Springville	Utah	History	Operated by volunteers and the Daughters of Utah Pioneers, local history
Sterling DUP Museum		Sterling	Sanpete	History	Operated by the Daughters of Utah Pioneers, open by appointment
St. George Art Museum		St. George	Washington	Art	website, art from Utah and the Southwest
St. George Children's Museum		St. George, Utah	Washington	Children's	
St. George Dinosaur Discovery Site at Johnson Farm		St. George	Washington	Natural history	website, dinosaur tracks, fossil fish, plants, rare dinosaur remains, invertebrates traces and sedimentary structures
Summit County Historical Museum		Coalville	Summit	History	website, local history
Syracuse DUP Museum		Syracuse	Davis	History	Operated by the Daughters of Utah Pioneers, open by appointment
Syracuse Museum & Cultural Center		Syracuse	Davis	History	website, local history, period room and farm displays, household items
Taylorsville Bennion Heritage Center		Taylorsville	Salt Lake	Historic house	website, 19th-century period house
Teasdale DUP Museum		Teasdale	Wayne	History	Operated by the Daughters of Utah Pioneers, pioneer artifacts, open by appointment
Temple Square Visitor Centers		Salt Lake City	Salt Lake	Religious	Two visitor centers that provide tours of the area buildings, exhibits about the LDS church’s humanitarian efforts, prophets, Joseph Smith, the Book of Mormon, history of the Salt Lake Temple
Territorial Statehouse State Park Museum		Fillmore	Millard	History	State history, pioneer artifacts, two restored cabins and a schoolhouse
This Is the Place Heritage Park		Salt Lake City	Salt Lake	Open air	Includes heritage village and Native American village, living history demonstrations
Tintic Mining Museum		Eureka	Juab	Mining	Historic mining tools, mining relics, minerals, and other historical artifacts
Tooele Pioneer Museum		Tooele	Tooele	History	Local history, pioneer artifacts, adjacent to the Daughters of Utah Pioneers Museum and Log Cabin
Tooele Valley Railroad Museum		Tooele	Tooele	Railroad	Locomotives and equipment from the Tooele Valley Railway, other local railroads, smelting and mining artifacts
Topaz Museum		Delta	Millard	History	website, planned museum about the Topaz War Relocation Center
Treehouse Museum		Ogden	Weber	Children's	website
Tremonton Firefighting Museum		Tremonton	Box Elder	Firefighting	website
Uintah County DUP Museum		Vernal	Uintah	History	Operated by the Daughters of Utah Pioneers, pioneer artifacts
Uintah County Heritage Museum		Vernal	Uintah	History	website, local history
USU Eastern Prehistoric Museum		Price	Carbon	Natural history	Dinosaurs, Fremont culture, Utah’s Ice Age ecology and Paleoindian presence
USU Galleries		Logan	Cache	Art	website, galleries of the Caine School of the Arts of Utah State University
USU Museum of Anthropology		Logan	Cache	Anthropology	Part of Utah State University, includes Native American, Meso-American, Egyptian, and ancient Near Eastern artifacts
Utah Cowboy and Western Heritage Museum		Ogden	Weber	History	Includes the Utah Cowboy Hall of Fame, honors artists, champions, entertainers, musicians, ranchers, and writers who have promoted the western life style; located in Union Station
Utah Field House of Natural History State Park Museum		Vernal	Uintah	Natural history	Dinosaurs, fossils, geology, natural history, Utah's Fremont culture and Ute tribe artifacts
Utah State Firefighters Museum		Tooele	Tooele	Firefighting	website, part of the Deseret Peak Complex, vintage fire vehicles and equipment
Utah Governor's Mansion		Salt Lake City	Salt Lake	Historic house	
Utah House		Kaysville	Davis	Environment	Sustainable building demonstration and education center located at the Utah Botanical Center
Utah Museum of Contemporary Art		Salt Lake City	Salt Lake	Art	Exhibits groundbreaking contemporary artwork by local, national, and international artists in four galleries, formerly known as the Salt Lake Art Center
Utah Museum of Fine Arts		Salt Lake City	Salt Lake	Art	Part of the University of Utah, collections include African, Oceanic and the New World, Asian, European, American, and the Ancient and Classical World
Utah Southern Railroad Depot Museum		Lehi	Utah	Railroad	Also known as Lehi Railroad Depot Museum
Utah State Capitol		Salt Lake City	Salt Lake	History	
Utah State Railroad Museum		Ogden	Weber	Railroad	Located in Union Station
Wasatch County DUP Museum		Heber City	Wasatch	History	Operated by the Daughters of Utah Pioneers, open by appointment
Washington City Museum		Washington	Washington	History	
Weber County Pioneer Museum		Ogden	Weber	History	Operated by the Daughters of Utah Pioneers, museum and 1841 Miles Goodyear Cabin
Weber State University Museum of Natural Science		Ogden	Weber	Natural history	website
Wellsville Tabernacle DUP Museum		Wellsville	Cache	History	Operated by the Daughters of Utah Pioneers, pioneer artifacts
Western Mining and Railroad Museum		Helper	Carbon	Railroad	Impact of area railroads and coal mining
Western Sky Aviation Warbird Museum		St. George	Washington	Aviation	Restored aircraft
West Jordan DUP Museum		West Jordan	Salt Lake	History	Operated by the Daughters of Utah Pioneers, pioneer artifacts, open by appointment
West Jordan Historical Museum		West Jordan	Salt Lake	History	website, local history, includes farm homestead and blacksmith shop, operated by the West Jordan Historical Society
The Whitaker		Centerville	Davis	Historic house	website
Woodbury Art Museum		Orem	Utah	Art	website, part of Utah Valley University, focus is modern and contemporary art
Zion Human History Museum		Springdale	Washington	History	website, operated by Zion National Park, includes American Indian culture, historic pioneer settlement, Zion's growth as a national park, the effects of water in Zion

== Defunct museums ==
- Deseret Museum, Salt Lake City
- McCurdy Historical Doll Museum, Provo
- North Box Elder County Museum, Tremonton
- Railroad Village Museum, Corinne
- Riverton Museum at the Crane House, Riverton
- Roy Historical Museum, Roy
- Southern Utah Air Museum, Washington

== See also ==
- Arboreta in Utah (category)
- Botanical gardens in Utah (category)
- Historic landmarks in Utah
- Houses in Utah (category)
- Forts in Utah (category)
- Museums list
- Nature Centers in Utah
- Registered Historic Places in Utah

== Resources ==
- Utah Museums Association Directory of Museums in Utah
- State of Utah Museums page
