= Daughters of Utah Pioneers Museum =

Daughters of Utah Pioneers Museum may refer to these museums operated by the Daughters of Utah Pioneers (DUP):

- Pioneer Memorial Museum, the DUP's flagship museum and headquarters in Salt Lake City
- Beaver County Courthouse, home of a DUP museum in Beaver, Utah
- Old Bell School, home of a DUP museum in Pleasant Grove, Utah
- Parowan Meetinghouse, home of a DUP museum in Parowan, Utah
- Springville Carnegie Library, home of a DUP museum in Springville, Utah
- Tooele County Courthouse and City Hall, home of a DUP museum in Tooele, Utah
- Weber Stake Relief Society Building, home of a DUP museum in Ogden, Utah
  - Miles Goodyear Cabin, oldest non-Native American building Utah, located at the DUP museum in Ogden, Utah
- West Jordan Ward Meetinghouse, home of a DUP museum in West Jordan, Utah
