= Education in Utah =

Education in Utah has a long history that has led to a more efficient education system throughout the state.

The education system started to take shape in 1847 when Mormon pioneers arrived in Utah state. The first schools were predominantly run by the Mormon community, with ecclesiastical leaders organizing the curriculum and facilities as well as teaching Mormon doctrines. When Utah became a state in 1896, schools became government-funded, allowing for free public-school education throughout the state. Today, the education system hosts a range of public, charter, and private K-14 schools. There is also a mix of private and public higher learning institutions throughout the state.

== History ==
=== Pioneer arrival and LDS influence ===
Early Mormons fled to present-day Utah – which was a Mexican territory at the time – to escape religious persecution and the Missouri Governor's extermination order, arriving in the Salt Lake Valley in 1847.

For the first two decades following the settlement, most schools were run through church institutions. Classes generally took place in meetinghouses of the Church of Jesus Christ of Latter-day Saints (LDS Church) and school boundaries mirrored the boundaries of LDS wards. The schools were each controlled by a local trustee that was appointed by the bishop of each ward. Schools were financed almost entirely by the families who attended the school, meaning that they heavily relied on the local economy.

The independent nature of each school and the fluctuating funds between areas meant that the quality of education and curriculum offered to pupils varied throughout the state. As they were mainly supported and sponsored by the church, the curriculum often covered Mormon moral values and even included LDS scripture as part of the supporting course content. In 1850, Latter-day Saints established the University of Deseret with a board of regents and a chancellor. The university assumed the role of preparing and qualifying teachers for the public schools and academies. In 1851, efforts were made to standardize curriculum and school policy through the new territorial superintendent of schools' office, but the impact of centralization was not immediate.

=== 19th century ===
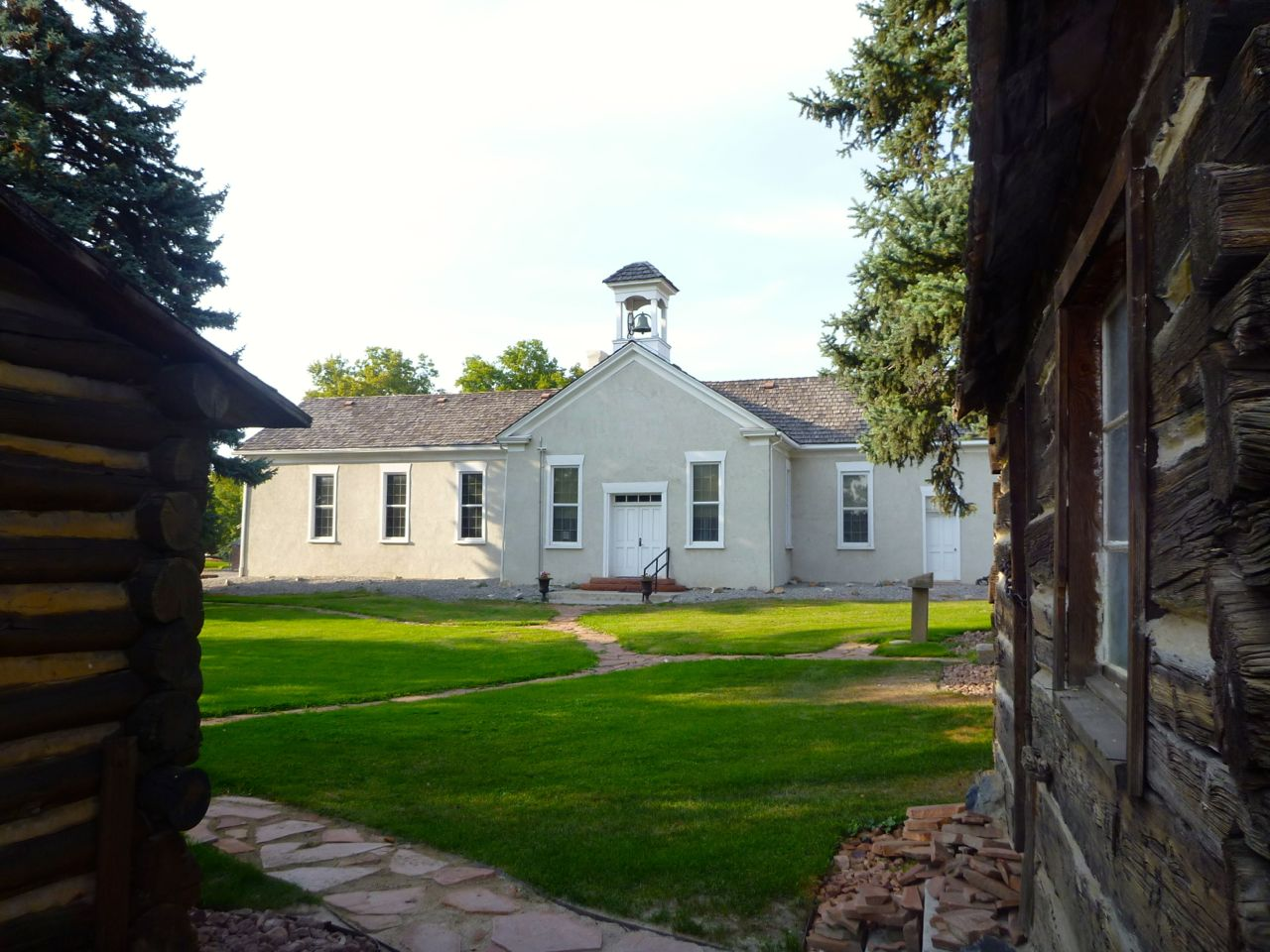
Schoolhouse in Pleasant Grove, originally built in 1852–53 with additional wings being built in 1864. Now recognized as a Daughters of Utah Pioneers historical site.

During the 1860s, an influx of Protestants and Catholics settled in Utah, which forced schools to shift from ecclesiastical control to government control. County superintendents were put in place, and the legal responsibility for school operations moved from Bishops to city councils. Local governments began to collect taxes to provide for teacher salaries and school supplies. Though Utah Mormons had been relatively isolated, the completion of the transcontinental railroad in 1869 grew the population with a number of non-LDS groups. Many of these new minority groups sought to “Christianize” the majority LDS population, despite Mormons being a Christian denomination. Protestants sought to eliminate Mormon teachings in schools by educating the children of Utah in the hope of converting them. Mission schools were established to serve this purpose, the first of which was St. Mark's School and was built in 1867. The school still exists today. These schools also provided private education, free from Mormon doctrine and influence.

By 1870, most public schools still required fees to provide salaries and materials, resulting in a push for publicized education. The legislature began using territorial receipts to provide these funds. The non-LDS community made up 20% of the population at this point, and resisted the idea of regionally funding public schools which were still essentially Mormon-dominated schools. The minority religions called for a separation of church and state, a call made more significant as the Territorial Superintendent of District Schools at the time was John Taylor, the third president of the LDS Church, who had defeated the first liberal candidate to run, M.W. Ashbrook.

In 1887, the federal government stepped in, issuing the Edmunds–Tucker Act which required changes to many of the LDS Church's political and social practices. This included a call to end polygamy and abolishing the territorial Superintendent of Schools. The Territorial Supreme Court was then given appointment power of a "commissioner of schools" who would approve content used in schools and look to integrate Mormon students, non-Mormon students and teachers. Soon after, legislation passed the School Law of 1890 which made public education free throughout the territory. When Utah achieved statehood in 1896, this law expanded to make the schools government-funded and free of sectarian control.

=== 20th century ===
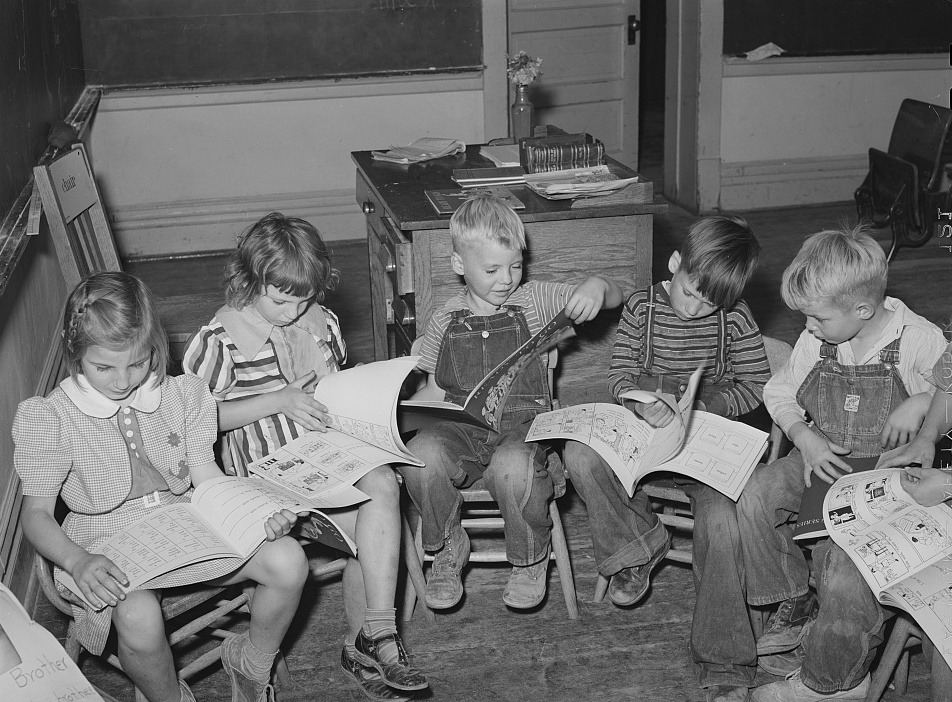
Utah children reading in school, Santa Clara, Utah, 1940

In the 20th century, Utah became one of the first states to equalize education throughout the state. In 1919, the first compulsory attendance laws were passed in Utah, leading to increased enrollment in schools. However, the rise in student enrollment across the public school system created in itself new issues that would challenge the state.

==== Conflicts between church and state ====
The conflict between church and state commonly existed in public schools in Utah during this time. At the turn of the 20th century, Utah boasted one of the lowest private enrollment rates in the U.S. (0.5%). Non-Mormon families in Utah felt that public schools were essentially private because of the heavy LDS Church influence on curriculum. The church attempted to create private school system in response to Protestant education reforms, but they were transformed into public schools, which in turn led to a low private school enrollment rate.

==== Financial crises and reforms ====
After World War II, Utah's attention turned back to improving education. It was notable that students continued to achieve above-average test scores despite the deprivation of funds. This can partly be attributed Utah's above-average birth rate compared to other U.S. states. After World War II, teachers and schools started to seek more funding from the government. This proved challenging during the governorship of J. Bracken Lee (1949–1957) due to sweeping budget reforms and his objection to receiving federal aid. Once Lee left office, governors sought ways to better fund teachers and the education system, but these efforts proved insufficient.

In 1960, around 12% of teachers in Utah moved states for work, partially due to having lower salaries. Many students who trained to be teachers ended up working outside Utah. This resulted in around half of Utah teaching jobs filled by uncertified people or those certified through questionable means. The maintenance of buildings was also a challenge for teachers. Some schoolhouses were falling apart and prevented effective teaching, with some roofs of buildings collapsing during school hours. In May 1964, the financial crisis became so extreme that the National Education Association (NEA) sanctioned the Utah state education system. This was the first time this had happened to a whole state in the history of the NEA. After Cal Rampton, a democratic governor elected after Lee, resolved some of the financial issues raised through NEA sanctions, the sanctions were lifted in 1965. After Rampton conducted his educational reforms and provided better funding for schools, they restarted operations. Student performance was no longer above the national average.

In 1983, the National Commission of Excellence in Education ranked US students below average compared to other developed and developing countries around the world, prompting additional educational reforms in Utah and throughout the United States. Utah's governor, Scott Matheson, adopted new goals which helped improve education in Utah following the trends of the US.

==== Indian Placement Program (1953–1996) ====
The Indian Placement Program was an official LDS program that aimed to provide Native American children education in schools dominated by white settlers in the Mormon Corridor. The program stemmed from the church's desire to invite Native Americans or "Lamanites" into the church and become one people with them.

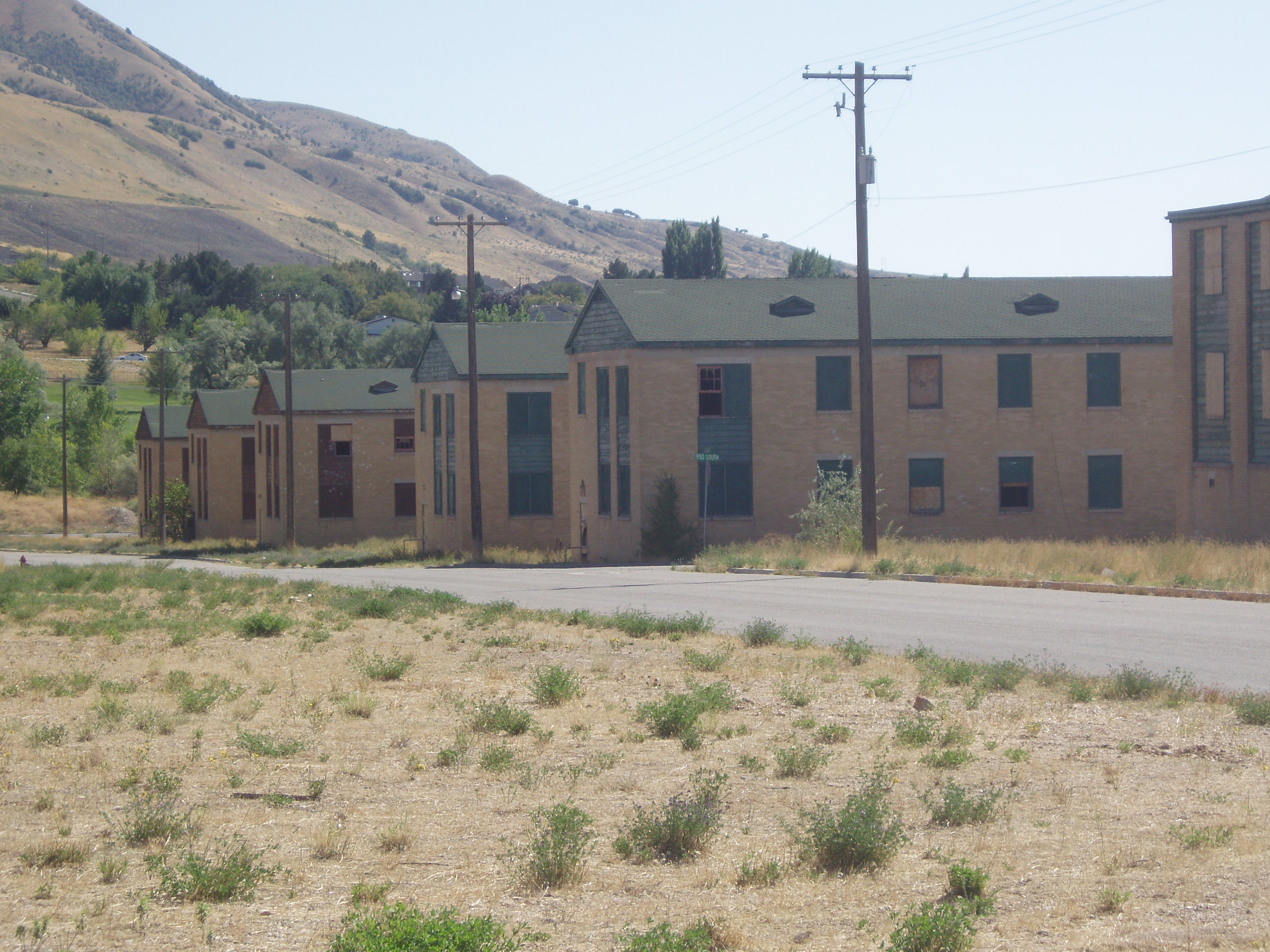
The Intermountain Indian School in Brigham City that ran from 1950 to 1984

The church invited Native American children to live with an active family in the city for the duration of the school year, allowing them to attend a local school close to their "foster" home. Participation required children to be baptized members of the church, be relatively free of emotional oddities, want to be educated, and keep good grades. Their biological parents would sign a form to allow them to participate in the program. The church and the "foster" family would provide for the remaining needs of the child. The program reached maximum enrollment in the 1970s at about 5,000 students.

There were mixed reactions regarding involvement in the program. Some participants felt the program helped them, while others felt that their involvement in the program took them away from their culture, which they could no longer identify with. Other critics claimed that the church was kidnapping children to indoctrinate them into their faith and culture, while some claimed it harmed the children's psychological welfare by separating them from their biological parents.

As schools on reservations improved throughout the 1980s, enrollment in the Indian Placement Program fell until the church officially ended the program in 1996.

== Present day ==
=== Primary and secondary education ===
Public education in Utah follows the K-12 system in which students attend primary and secondary schools, of which there are three kinds throughout the state: public, charter, and private.

The Utah State Board of Education oversees all public education legislation and standards throughout the state including all public and charter schools (which are funded through the state). There are currently forty-two public school districts with a total student population of 666,858 and a student-teacher ratio of 1:21. The approved public education budget for the 2020 fiscal year was $5.6 billion, and the state graduation rate for 2019 was 87.4%.

In addition to public and charter schools, there are approximately 166 private schools operating throughout the state.

=== Higher education ===
Utah has eight public schools within the Utah System of Higher Education:

==== Universities ====
- Southern Utah University
- University of Utah
- Utah State University
- Utah Tech University
- Utah Valley University
- Weber State University

==== Community and junior colleges ====
- Snow College
- Salt Lake Community College.

The system is governed by the state legislated Utah State Board of Regents, whose members are appointed by the governor.

Private institutions in Utah include Brigham Young University and Westminster College, among others.
