= C. J. Wilcox =

American basketball player (born 1990)

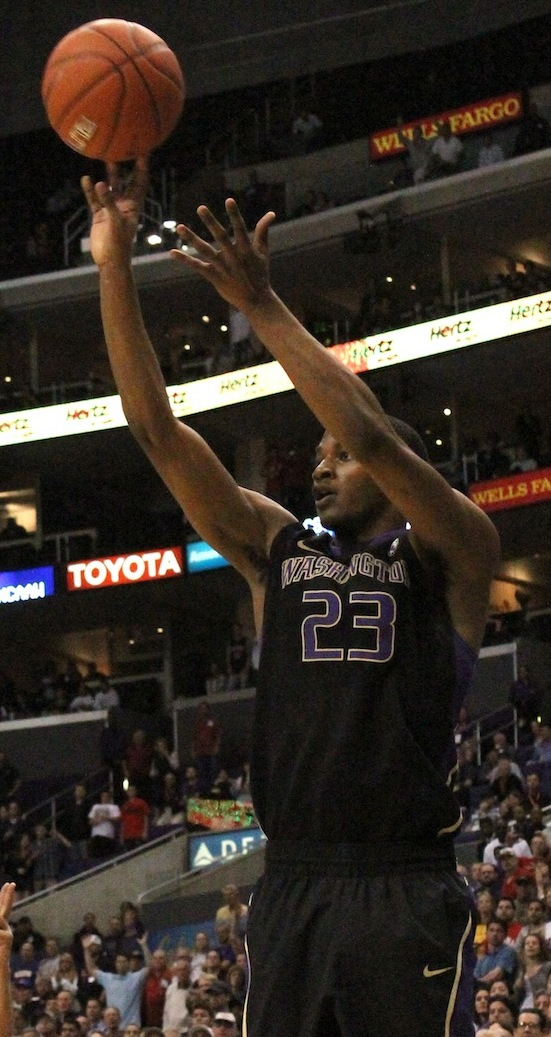
- Wilcox playing for Washington in 2011

Personal information
- Born: December 30, 1990 (age 35) Pleasant Grove, Utah, U.S.
- Listed height: 6 ft 5 in (1.96 m)
- Listed weight: 195 lb (88 kg)

Career information
- High school: Pleasant Grove (Pleasant Grove, Utah)
- College: Washington (2010–2014)
- NBA draft: 2014: 1st round, 28th overall pick
- Drafted by: Los Angeles Clippers
- Playing career: 2014–2020
- Position: Shooting guard
- Number: 30, 23

Career history
- 2014–2016: Los Angeles Clippers
- 2015: →Fort Wayne Mad Ants
- 2015: →Bakersfield Jam
- 2015–2016: →Canton Charge
- 2016–2017: Orlando Magic
- 2016–2017: →Erie BayHawks
- 2017–2018: Santa Cruz Warriors
- 2019–2020: Fort Wayne Mad Ants

Career highlights
- 2× Second-team All-Pac-12 (2013, 2014); Pac-10 All-Freshman Team (2011)
- Stats at NBA.com
- Stats at Basketball Reference

Brian Craig "C. J." Wilcox (born December 30, 1990) is an American former professional basketball player. The 6 ft 5 in (1.96 m) shooting guard played high school basketball at Pleasant Grove High School before going on to complete four years at the University of Washington. He was selected by the Los Angeles Clippers with the 28th overall pick in the 2014 NBA draft.

== Early life ==
Wilcox was raised by his grandmother in Eastman, Georgia, while his father, Craig, was away attending BYU. In 1995, at the age of four, Wilcox moved from Georgia to Utah to live with his father.

As a youth, Wilcox played Amateur Athletic Union (AAU) basketball in the state of Utah. As early as the seventh grade, Wilcox starred alongside Tyler Haws on an AAU team called the Wildcats. Both Wilcox and Haws went on to play together on the Salt Lake City Metro.

== High school career ==
Wilcox attended Pleasant Grove High School in Pleasant Grove, Utah where he starred alongside his cousin, LeSean, who went on to play for Salt Lake Community College from 2009 to 2011. As a freshman in 2005–06, he averaged 15.2 points per game, while as a sophomore in 2006–07, he averaged 23.7 points per game.

As a junior in 2007–08, Wilcox averaged 23.7 points, six rebounds, 2.2 steals and two blocks per game.

Wilcox was recruited by Utah, BYU, Utah State, San Diego University, Miami (FL), Florida State, Iowa State, Cal-Berkeley and others. In November 2008, he signed a National Letter of Intent to play college basketball at the University of Washington.

As a senior in 2008–09, Wilcox averaged 22.2 points per game as he was named to the Region 4 first team.

Considered a three-star recruit by Rivals.com, Wilcox was listed as the No. 24 shooting guard and the No. 108 player in the nation in 2009.

On February 12, 2016, Wilcox had his #23 jersey retired by Pleasant Grove High School, becoming the first player in school history to receive the honor.

== College career ==
In November 2009, the Washington Huskies announced that Wilcox would redshirt the 2009–10 season.

In his freshman season at Washington in 2010–11, Wilcox was named to the Pac-10 All-Freshman team. In 33 games, he averaged 8.1 points and 2.1 rebounds in 15.8 minutes per game.

In his sophomore season, Wilcox was an Honorable Mention All-Pac-12 selection after his 73 three-pointers ranked 5th most in UW single-season history and moved to fifth all-time in UW history with 136 three-pointers. In 32 games, he averaged 14.2 points, 3.4 rebounds and 1.2 assists in 28.5 minutes per game. In June 2012, he attended Kevin Durant's Skills Academy.

In his junior season, Wilcox earned second-team All-Pac-12 honors after scoring 570 points in 2012–13, the 11th highest UW single-season total. In 34 games, he averaged 16.8 points, 4.3 rebounds, 1.9 assists, 1.1 steals and 1.1 blocks in 34.8 minutes per game.

In his senior season, Wilcox earned second-team All-Pac-12 honors for the second straight year after scoring 587 points in 2013–14, tying for the eighth highest UW single-season total. He was also named first-team all-district by the National Association of Basketball Coaches (NABC) and the United States Basketball Writers Association (USBWA). In 32 games, he averaged 18.3 points, 3.7 rebounds, 2.5 assists, 1.0 steals and 1.0 blocks in 34.9 minutes per game.

Wilcox finished his career with 1,880 career points, which ranks second all-time at UW. He also finished with 98 blocked shots, which ranks fifth all-time and ranks top all-time amongst guards at UW. He is also the Washington record holder for most career three-pointers made with 301, which also ranks sixth in Pac-12 history; is one of three players in Pac-12 history to record 1,700 career points, 275 career three-pointers and 400 career rebounds (Jason Kapono, UCLA, 1999–03; Jason Gardner, Arizona, 1999–03); and set Washington's single-season made three-point field goals record with 90 in 2013–14.

== Professional career ==
=== Los Angeles Clippers (2014–2016) ===
In May 2014, Wilcox was invited to the 2014 NBA Draft Combine where he performed well in athletic tests and was ranked one of the top shooters.

On June 26, 2014, Wilcox was selected with the 28th overall pick in the 2014 NBA draft by the Los Angeles Clippers. On July 7, it was announced that Wilcox would miss the 2014 NBA Summer League due to a right shoulder injury. On July 12, he signed with the Clippers. Having appeared in just three games for the Clippers, he was assigned to the Fort Wayne Mad Ants of the NBA Development League on January 6, 2015. On January 21, he was recalled by the Clippers. On February 8, he scored a season-high 10 points in a loss to the Oklahoma City Thunder.

In July 2015, Wilcox joined the Clippers for the 2015 NBA Summer League where he averaged 14.0 points and 3.2 rebounds in five games. During the 2015–16 season, using the flexible assignment rule, Wilcox had multiple assignments to the Canton Charge and Bakersfield Jam of the NBA Development League.

=== Orlando Magic / Erie BayHawks (2016–2017) ===
On July 15, 2016, Wilcox was traded, along with cash considerations, to the Orlando Magic in exchange for Devyn Marble and a future second round draft pick. On April 3, 2017, he was waived by the Magic. Wilcox played in 22 games with Orlando during the 2016–17 season. He also appeared in four games with the Erie BayHawks of the NBA Development League on assignment, averaging 12.5 points, 4.3 rebounds, 2.0 assists and 1.25 steals in 25.3 minutes per game.

=== Portland Trail Blazers / Santa Cruz Warriors (2017–2018) ===
On August 9, 2017, Wilcox signed with the Portland Trail Blazers on a two-way contract with the NBA G League. On October 23, he was ruled out for six to eight weeks after undergoing successful arthroscopy on his right knee. He ultimately did not appear in a game for the Trail Blazers.

=== Indiana Pacers / Fort Wayne Mad Ants (2019–2020) ===
Wilcox signed a two-way deal with the Indiana Pacers in August 2018. On September 21, 2018, it was announced that he had suffered a torn Achilles tendon and would miss the entire season. On October 19, Wilcox was waived by the Pacers.

On July 1, 2019, the Indiana Pacers re–signed Wilcox to an Exhibit 10 contract. On October 16, 2019, Wilcox was waived by the Indiana Pacers. On October 26, Wilcox was included in the training camp roster for the Fort Wayne Mad Ants. On November 6, Wilcox was included in the opening night roster of the Fort Wayne Mad Ants. On January 28, 2020, he posted 25 points, four rebounds, and two steals in a loss to the Salt Lake City Stars. Wilcox averaged 13.6 points and 2.7 rebounds per game.

On January 17, 2022, Wilcox's rights were traded from the Fort Wayne Mad Ants to the Grand Rapids Gold.

== Career statistics ==
Legend
GP	Games played	GS	Games started	MPG	Minutes per game
FG%	Field goal percentage	3P%	3-point field goal percentage	FT%	Free throw percentage
RPG	Rebounds per game	APG	Assists per game	SPG	Steals per game
BPG	Blocks per game	PPG	Points per game	**Bold**	Career high

=== College ===
Year	Team	GP	GS	MPG	FG%	3P%	FT%	RPG	APG	SPG	BPG	PPG
2010–11	Washington	33	6	15.8	.419	.401	.806	2.1	.9	.4	.3	8.1
2011–12	Washington	32	12	28.5	.437	.403	.839	3.4	1.2	.9	.6	14.2
2012–13	Washington	34	34	34.8	.419	.366	.816	4.3	1.9	1.1	1.1	16.8
2013–14	Washington	32	32	34.9	.453	.391	.873	3.7	2.5	1.0	1.0	18.3

=== NBA ===
==== Regular season ====
Year	Team	GP	GS	MPG	FG%	3P%	FT%	RPG	APG	SPG	BPG	PPG
2014–15	L.A. Clippers	21	0	4.8	**.421**	.368	**1.000**	.3	.4	.1	.0	2.0
2015–16	L.A. Clippers	**23**	0	**7.3**	.394	**.391**	.750	**.5**	.4	**.4**	**.1**	**3.0**
2016–17	Orlando	22	0	4.9	.258	.200	**1.000**	**.5**	**.5**	.1	.0	1.0
**Career**		66	0	5.7	.370	.333	.786	.5	.5	.2	.1	2.0

==== Playoffs ====
Year	Team	GP	GS	MPG	FG%	3P%	FT%	RPG	APG	SPG	BPG	PPG
2016	L.A. Clippers	2	0	3.5	.000	–	–	.5	.5	.0	.0	.0

== Personal life ==
Wilcox's father, Craig, played collegiately at Brigham Young from 1993 to 1995.

Wilcox married his wife Katelyn in 2017.
