= Joe Quinney Winter Sports Center =

Museum in Summit County, Utah, United States

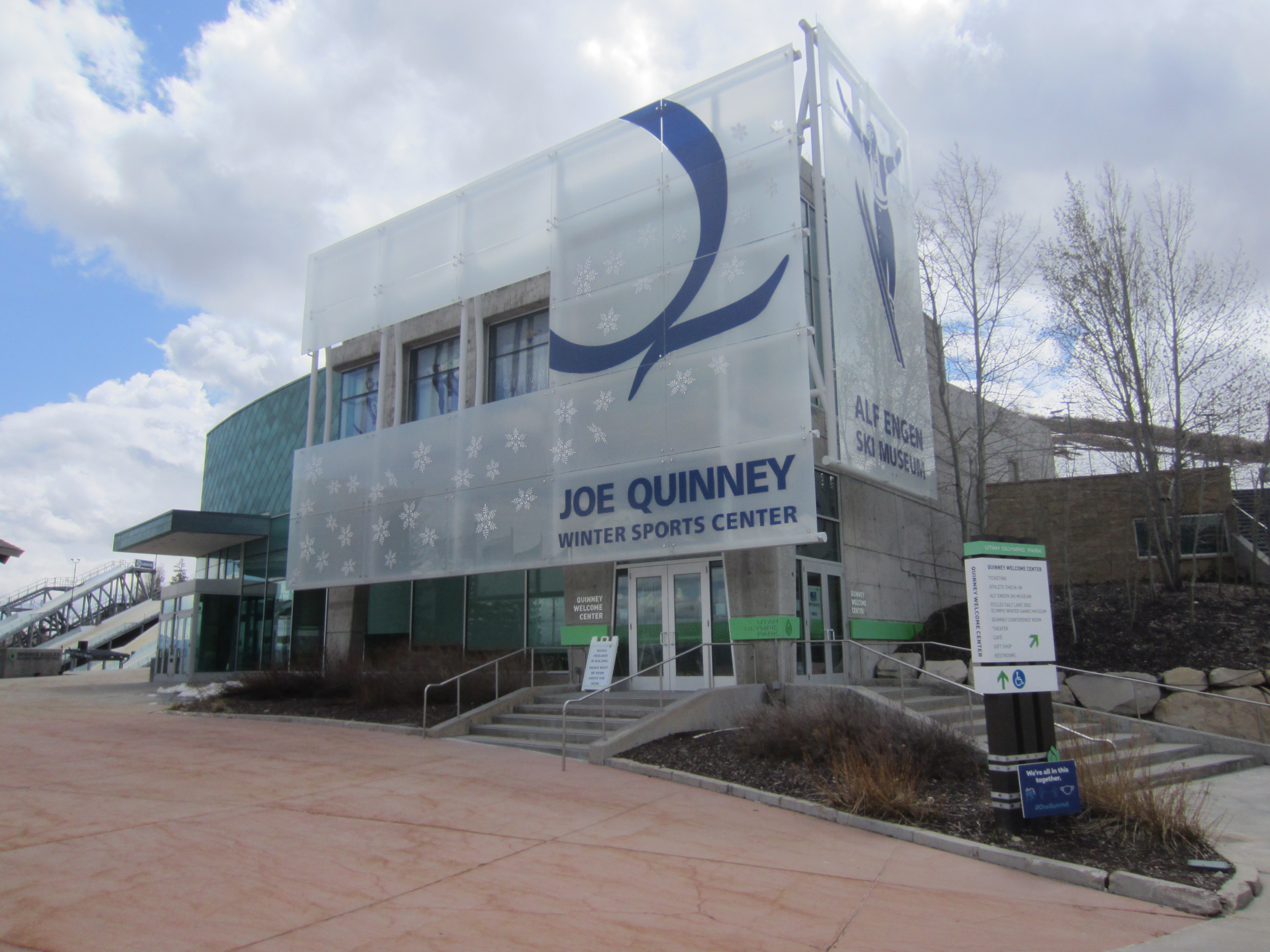
- The sports center, May 2021
- Location: Utah Olympic Park; Summit County, Utah; United States
- Coordinates: 40.7117981°N 111.5617093°W
- Owner: Utah Athletic Foundation

The Joe Quinney Winter Sports Center is a museum building within the Utah Olympic Park in Summit County, Utah, United States, that houses both the Alf Engen Ski Museum and the Eccles Salt Lake 2002 Olympic Winter Games Museum, as well as the main offices of the Utah Athletic Foundation (also known as the Utah Olympic Legacy Foundation). The center stands next to the day lodge and summer splash pool in the park.

== History ==
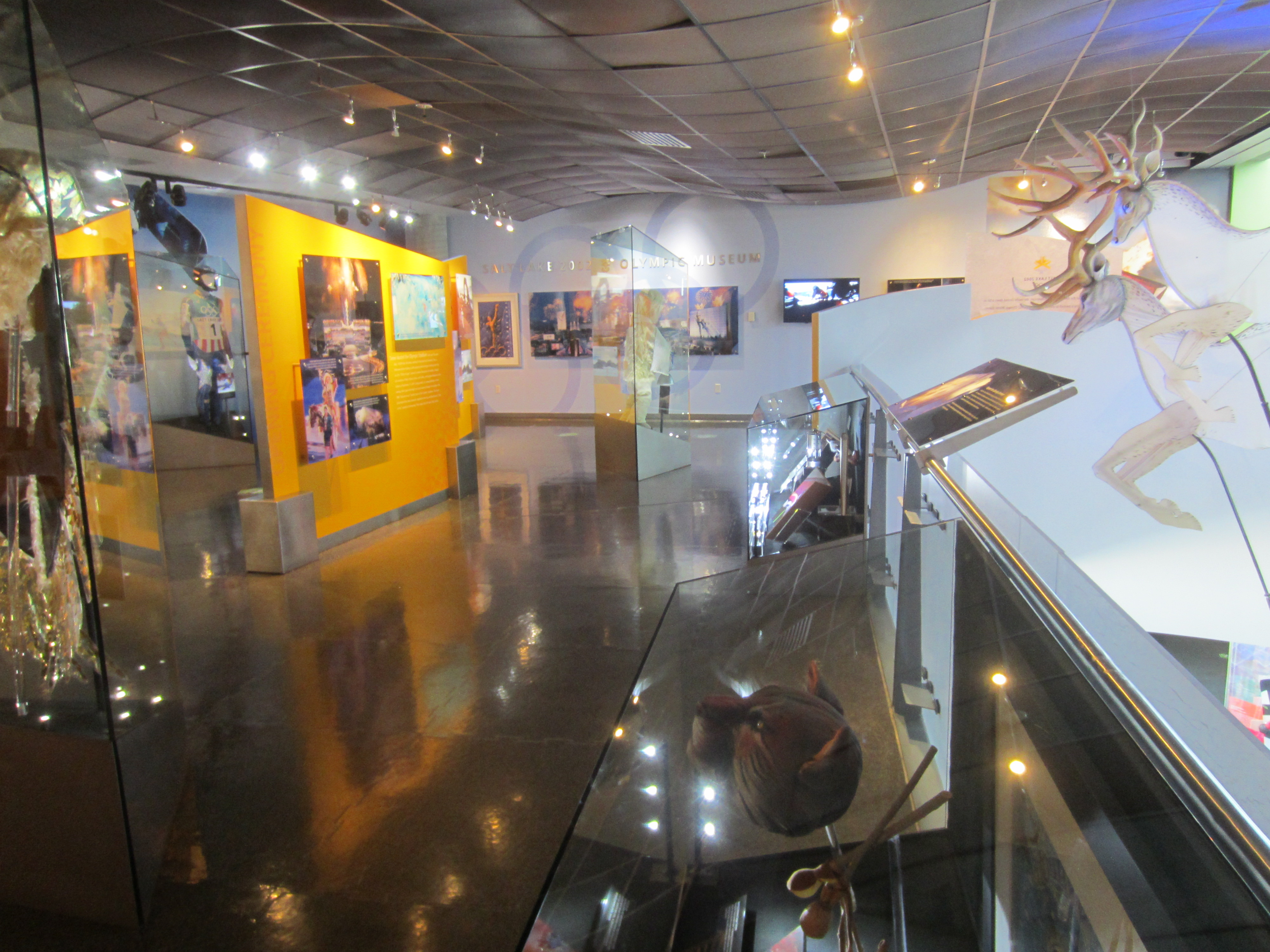
Inside the sports center, May 2021

For many years the Alf Engen Ski Foundation had desired to construct a museum to honor legendary skier Alf Engen, and display his winter sports collection. It was decided to do this inside a future building at the park, also named for a skier, Joe Quinney. A site dedication ceremony for the privately funded Joe Quinney Winter Sports Center was held August 28, 1999, while construction didn't begin until after the actual groundbreaking on March 28, 2000. Following the building's completion, it was temporarily turned over to Salt Lake Organizing Committee (SLOC) during a ceremony on September 18, 2001. During the games the center would be used by Olympic officials, members of the world media and athletes, then after the games, the building would be turned back over to the foundation. The cost of just the vacant building was $10 million, the majority of which was privately funded, but SLOC did contribute a percentage of construction costs so the building could be used during the games. The completed building was 29,000 square feet (2,700 m^{2}) in size with three stories, and its concrete exterior was covered with Plexiglas (various figures and designs were etched into the Plexiglas).

Following the Olympics the building was turned into a ski and Olympic museum at a cost of $2.5 million more, for a total of $12.5 million. The Alf Engen Ski Museum opened in a soft opening on May 20, 2002, with exhibits designed by Academy Studios. The grand opening ceremony for the center was held July 5, 2002, and the building included the Engen Ski Museum, a gift shop, café and a temporary Olympic photo exhibit (which would be replaced by a new Olympic museum in later years).

On September 27, 2002, two life-sized statues of Alf Engen and Joe Quinney were unveiled in the Olympic plaza near the building. In May 2004 the Alf Engen Ski Foundation sold the center to the Utah Athletic Foundation, who owns and operates the surrounding Utah Olympic Park. In early June 2005 the temporary 2002 Olympic Photo Exhibit was replaced with a new permanent Olympic museum. An opening celebration for the officially titled "George Eccles Salt Lake 2002 Olympic Winter Games Museum" was held June 9, 2005.

== Exhibits ==
The center houses two museums, the Alf Engen Ski Museum and the George Eccles Salt Lake 2002 Olympic Winter Games Museum. The Ski Museum contains more than 300 trophies, medals, uniforms, scrapbooks, skis, boots, photos, films and other collectibles that span some 70 years in the career of the Engen family. It also highlights Utah's rich ski history and the Wasatch Range, along with efforts made by the U.S. Forest Service to help develop Utah's ski resorts, and an exhibit on Utah's winter weather.

The 2002 Winter Olympic Museum, currently located on the second floor of the center, includes athletic equipment used during the games, Olympic medals (and a display on how they were created), costumes and puppets used during the ceremonies, many of the officially licensed pins produced for the games, a photo op at an Olympic torch mounted in front of a large photo of the cauldron, along with video clips and other memorabilia.

== See also ==
- List of museums in Utah
