= Pleasant Grove High School (Utah) =

Location
- 700 East 200 South; Pleasant Grove, Utah, USA 84062; 40°21′37″N 111°43′30″W

Information
- School type: Public
- Established: 1912
- School district: Alpine School District
- CEEB code: 450305
- Principal: JD Hanks
- Teaching staff: 78.04 (FTE)
- Grades: 10-12
- Gender: Male and female
- Enrollment: 1,905 (2024-2025)
- Student to teacher ratio: 24.41
- Campus type: Open
- Colors: Royal blue White; Grey
- Athletics conference: 6A Region 4
- Nickname: Vikings
- Newspaper: Viking Crier
- Website: pghs.alpineschools.org

Pleasant Grove High School (PGHS) is a public high school located at approximately 700 East, 200 South in Pleasant Grove, Utah, United States. It was established in 1918. The current school location (700 East and 200 South) began student attendance in 1959.

Previously the high school was located on 100 East between Center and 100 South. This location served as the high school from 1918 to 1922. It is now referred to as the Old Bell School, and is currently a museum.

In January 1922 students began attending at a newly completed location on 200 South, between Main Street and 100 East. This school location included students in grades 7 through 12 until 1959. With the completion of the high school at 200 South and 700 East, the older school building continued to be used as the junior high school. In January 1976 a new Junior High School was completed and the former high school was sold by the school district to Pleasant Grove City.

== History ==
Pleasant Grove High School was established in 1912. It started in a small one-room building. Additional rooms were eventually added on due to the increasing number of students. The former location was the city's old recreational center. The school was eventually moved to a larger building half a mile away, built in 1959. The new building was not quite large enough, so the 9th grade stayed with the junior high school.

In 1921, a group of seniors put a block letter "G" on Little Mountain west of Mount Timpanogos. The first time the G was lit was in 1929. In 1984 the G was nearly taken down because of maintenance fees. The student body fought to keep the G standing and raised enough money to keep it from being taken down. From then on G Day was celebrated as a Pleasant Grove holiday. It was later removed from holiday status because the grass on the football field was being destroyed by the people celebrating. The G is lit every year for special occasions such as homecoming and graduation. Recently the lighting equipment and generator broke down because of age and use. The 2010-2011 student council started the "Light the G" fundraiser, spearheaded by student council member Jeremy Jensen. With the help of students and the community, they were able to raise over $5,500 and buy two new 500-watt generators, over 1,000 feet of new light cords and new fluorescent light bulbs. The G was lit again for the first time in about three years after the 2010 Homecoming game.

On September 12, 2020, a fire broke out on G Mountain due to an unextinguished fire at Kiwanis Park. The fire broke the old generator that powered the lights on the G. Along with the wear and tear of the old material, the marker began to fade. Lisa Young, a prominent member of Pleasant Grove, along with mayor Guy Fugal began the “Restore the G” campaign. The Pleasant Grove High School classes of 2022, 2023, and 2024 along with the rest of the community raised money to rejuvenate the historic site and make it more durable than ever before. Opting for concrete and embedded lights, the G lit up once again for the Homecoming Game on September 22, 2023.

In the school's early years, the mascot was the Pleasant Grove Grovarian. In 1959, when Pleasant Grove switched over schools, the mascot was changed to the Valkyrie. It was similar to the Grover, but the Valkyrie in Norse mythology is an angel of war who chooses which heroes will die in battle. It was later changed to the Viking, which is the current mascot.

In August 1972, a fire broke out in the new library. Riley Richards and Chris Varney, two janitors, were killed in the accident. While they were cleaning, volatile fumes filled the room they were in. A spark ignited the fumes, which caused an explosion, killing the two men and starting a raging fire in the library. It took the school approximately five years to fully rebuild the library. It was moved to the lower story of the building and was modified to reduce the chances of such a disaster recurring.

== Campus ==
=== Location ===
The campus of PGHS is located at 700 East 200 South, Pleasant Grove, Utah. It is under the jurisdiction of Alpine School District.

=== Additions ===
The original building was built at its current location in 1959. In 1998 an approximately 20,000 sq ft (1,900 m^{2}) addition containing a school-use computer lab and eight classrooms began construction that lasted for nine months. In 2007, a 68,500 sq ft (6,360 m^{2}). addition containing 29 new classrooms, a new attendance office and a new administrative office began construction. The construction lasted for two years and was completed in February 2009. The 29 classrooms include an art lab, two science labs and four computer labs, along with regular classrooms. With the completion of the 29 additional classrooms the school was able to demolish five trailers that had served as ten extra classrooms since 1988. Along with the addition, the school rebuilt their football field with turf and new bleachers, resurfaced their tennis courts, and renovated their home economics classrooms and their weight room. The total approximate size of the school is currently 246,000 sq ft (22,900 m^{2}).

Pleasant Grove High also had a 16-classroom satellite wing east of the main campus. Prior to the completion of the 2009 addition to the building, this satellite campus was demolished.

In 2015, a new main gym (known to students as "Valhalla" after the warrior paradise in Norse mythology) was completed along with 5 new classrooms. (These include a dance/spin class, weight room, and a golf simulator.)

=== Facilities ===
The approximately 20-acre (81,000 m^{2}) campus of PGHS contains tennis courts, a football field, soccer practice fields, a baseball field, and a joint city-school owned softball field. Some sports classes are taught on these fields, while other classes such as dance are taught at the nearby Pleasant Grove Community Center, located at 457 South Locust Avenue, Pleasant Grove, Utah.

== Academics ==
PGHS offers a variety of classes including Vocational (CTE), Advanced Placement (AP), and Concurrent Enrollment (CE) classes. Students can take CE classes to earn college credit during High School. CE offers the possibility to graduate with an associate degree from Utah Valley University (UVU), which is transferable to most other universities located in Utah. CTE stands for Career and Technical Education. CTE classes provide traditionally non-academic skills for specific jobs.

=== AP and ACT ===
In the 2010-2011 school year, PGHS offered a total of 19 Advanced Placement classes; this is up from the 18 it offered in the 2009–2010 school year. 21 percent of all students at PGHS earn credit for at least one Advanced Placement class each year. The most popular Advanced Placement class is Biology, because in addition to credit from the AP test, it also offers CE credit. Other Advanced Placement classes offered are Music, World History, Art, Psychology, Physics, and Chemistry. The average ACT score at PGHS is 23.5; the national average is 20.5.

== Sports ==
Varsity PGHS sports include boys' baseball, boys' and girls' basketball, boys' and girls' cross country, boys' football, boys' and girls' golf, boys' and girls' soccer, girls softball, boys' and girls' swim, boys and girls' tennis, boys' and girls' track & field, girls' volleyball, boys wrestling, girls wrestling, boys Lacrosse, and Girls Lacrosse.

Years that PGHS has won state championships for wrestling:
1971, 1972, 1974, 1986, 1989, 1991, 1992, 1993, 1994, 1995, 1996, 1997, 2011, 2012, 2013, 2014, 2015, 2016, 2018, 2019, 2020

Football:
1955, 1956, 1993

Volleyball:
2000, 2001, 2003, 2004, 2005, 2006, 2009, 2012, 2013, 2014, 2019

Baseball:
1974, 1994, 1997, 2015, 2019

Cross Country (Girls):
2017

Soccer (Boys):
2018

In 1955, Pleasant Grove High School took first place in the region in boys' baseball, football, and wrestling. In 1988, girls' volleyball took state, girls' basketball went undefeated, the wrestling took second in state, baseball went undefeated in region 8, and the swim team qualified for the state tourney.

=== Clubs ===
Clubs include ASL, Art, Band, Ballroom, Book Club, Color Guard, Dance, DECA, Drama, FCCLA, French, FBLA, FFA, HOSA, Computer Club, Journalism, Key Club, KPGR/PGSN, Minecraft Club, Mountain bike team, National Honor Society, Operation Smile, Orchestra, Physics, Spanish, Spirit Team, Student Council, TSA, and the famed Wilderness Exploration Club.

== Notable alumni ==
- D. Todd Christofferson, General Authority of the Church of Jesus Christ of Latter-day Saints
- Payton Henry, MLB player
- Todd Herzog, winner of Survivor: China
- Megan Huntsman, serial killer
- Mark Jensen, former NFL player
- Von G. Keetch, General Authority of the Church of Jesus Christ of Latter-day Saints
- C. J. Wilcox, basketball player on the Los Angeles Clippers
