= The Leonardo (Salt Lake City) =

Science and art museum in Salt Lake City, Utah, U.S.

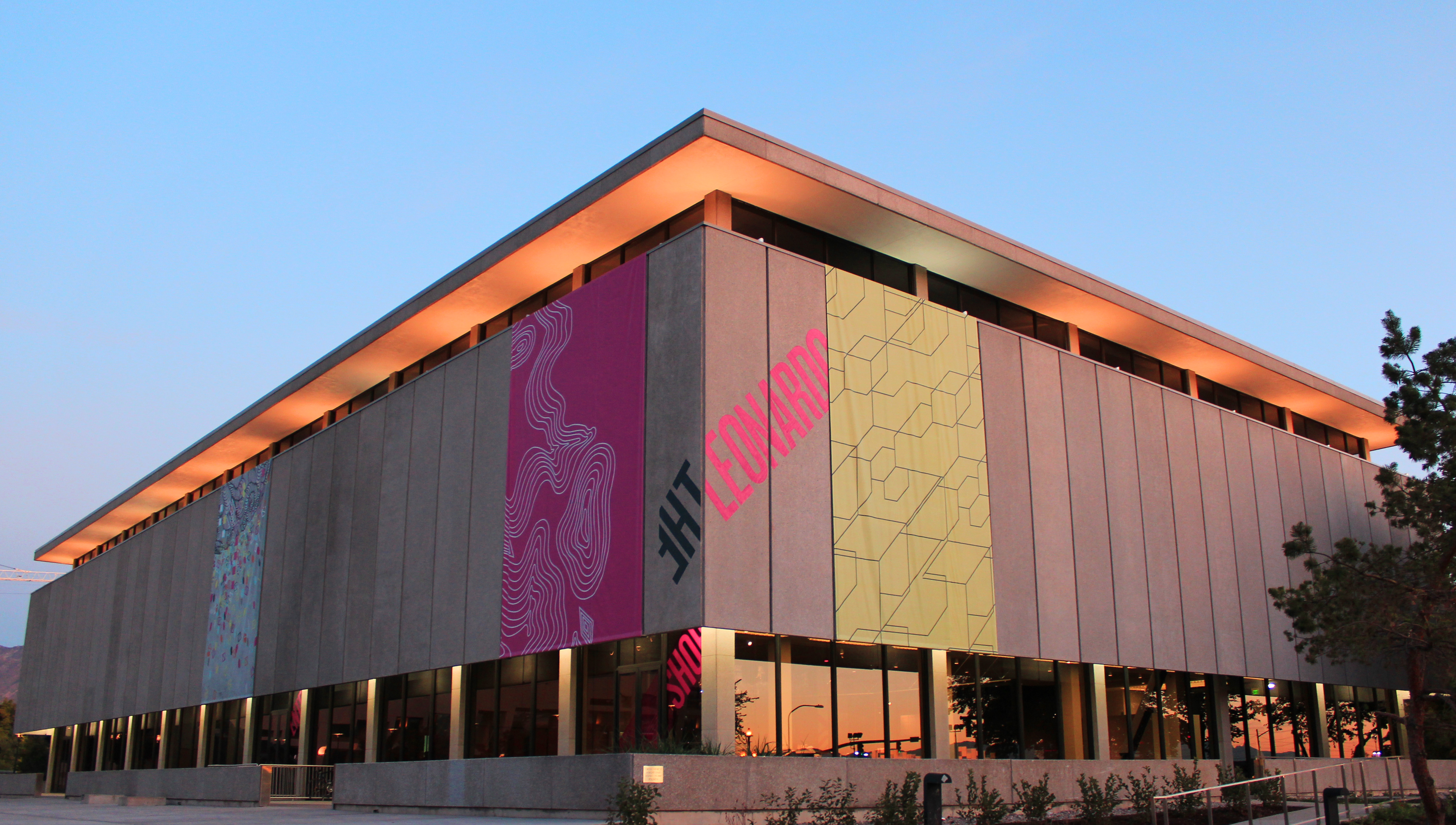
- The Leonardo, October 2011
- Established: October 8, 2011
- Dissolved: 2025
- Location: Salt Lake City, Utah
- Type: Museum: Interactive, Science & Art
- Visitors: ~175,000 annually, over 1,000,000 since est.
- Website: www.theleonardo.org

The Leonardo, located in downtown Salt Lake City, Utah, United States was a science and art museum where visitors could explore the ways that science, technology, art, and creativity connect. The museum operated from 2011 to 2025.

The educational philosophy of the museum was inspired by the Renaissance figure Leonardo da Vinci because of his willingness to follow his curiosity and his general belief that the arts and sciences were a part of the same enterprise. The museum was founded on the idea that Leonardo's approach is even more relevant today, as it has become harder to synthesize the incredible amount of information available to us in the modern age.

The Leonardo museum closed permanently in 2025 citing rising costs of maintaining the museum's infrastructure.

The Leonardo was run by a board of directors and an internal staff.

== Exhibits ==
TBA.

=== Temporary exhibits ===
- Body Worlds: Animal Inside Out - Part of Gunther von Hagens's series of Body Worlds exhibitions, this exhibit showcases a series of plastinated animal sculptures, including a mako shark, a sea snail, a spiny lobster, an octopus, a squid, a great white shark holding a seal in his mouth, a lion pouncing on an oryx from behind, an ostrich, a chicken, a cat, a dog, a duck, a rabbit, a cheetah, a sheep, a goat, a caribou, a horse, a cow, a bull, a yak, a caribou, a camel, a giraffe, an elephant, a bear, a gorilla, a human, and many others.

== See also ==
- List of museums in Utah
