= Anasazi State Park Museum =

State park and museum in Utah, United States

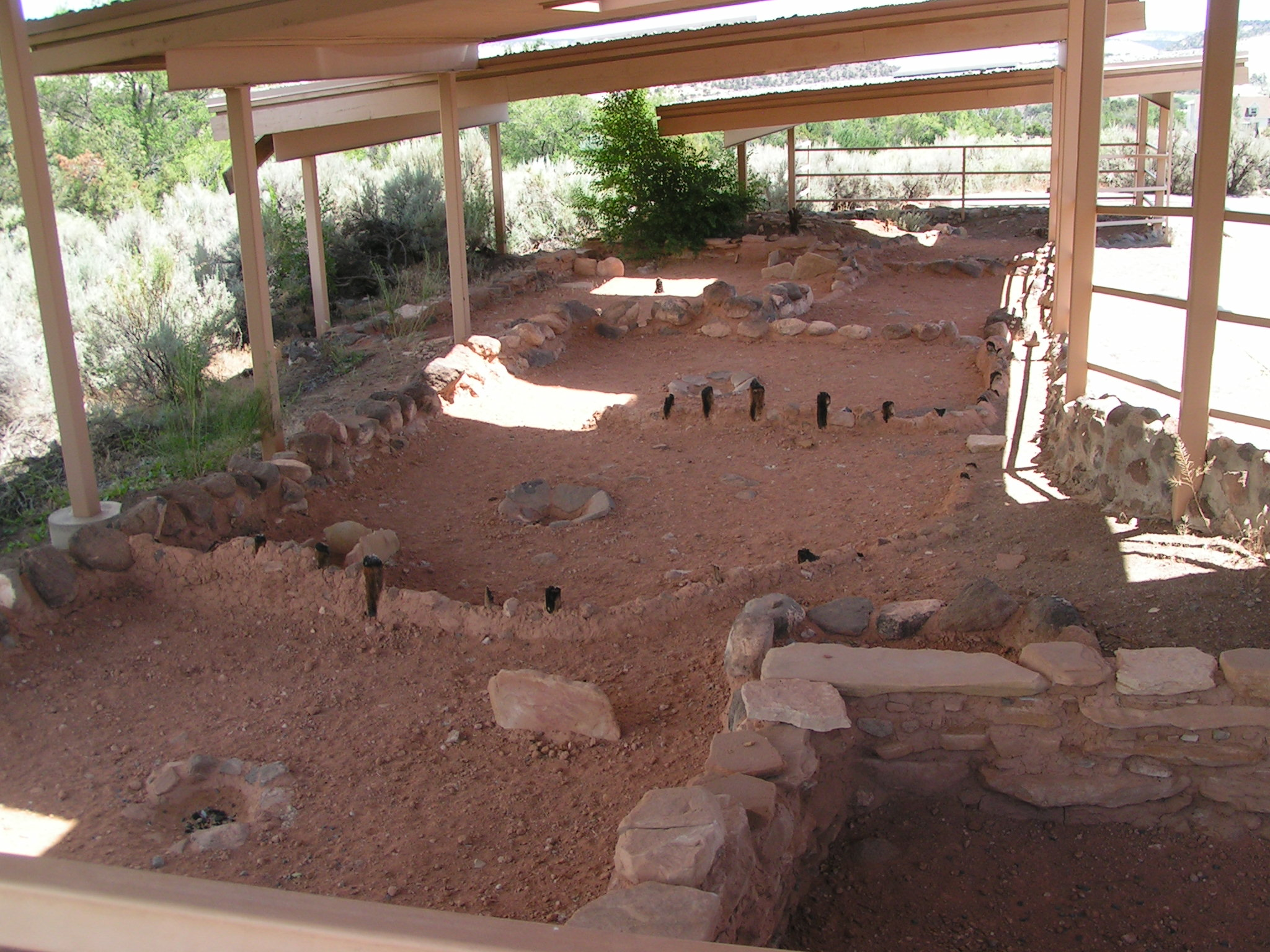

- Location within Utah Location within the United States
- Interactive map of Anasazi State Park Museum
- Location: Boulder, Utah, United States
- Coordinates: 37°54′39″N 111°25′24″W
- Area: 6 acres (2.4 ha)
- Elevation: 6,700 ft (2,000 m)
- Established: 1960 (purchase); 1970 (opened)
- Operator: Utah State Parks
- Visitors: 931 (in 2025)
- Website: Official website
- Utah State Parks

Anasazi State Park Museum is a state park and museum in southern Utah, United States, featuring the ruins of an ancient Ancestral Puebloan (Anasazi) village referred to as the Coombs Village Site.

== Facilities ==
Established as a Utah state park in 1960, the 6-acre (2.4 ha) Anasazi State Park Museum opened to the public in 1970. It features a visitor center, a museum with examples of Ancestral Puebloan pottery and other artifacts, a museum store, an auditorium, and picnic areas. It is located in Boulder, Utah, at the edge of 11,000-foot-tall (3,400 m) Boulder Mountain.

The park is focused around the reconstructed ruins of an ancient Ancestral Puebloan village, referred to as the Coombs Village Site, which is located directly behind the museum. There is a self-guided trail visitors can take through the village with interpretive signs explaining the various features of the village and the culture of the people who once lived there.

== Archaeological site ==
The Coombs Site is the site of one of the largest Ancestral Puebloan communities known to have existed west of the Colorado River. The name Anasazi, Navajo for "Ancient Enemies," or "Enemies of Our Ancestors" is sometimes used to describe the Pueblo culture that existed in the Four Corners area from about 1 AD to 1300 AD. However, many contemporary people of Pueblo descent eschew this word due to its negative etymology. This village is believed to have been occupied from 1160 AD to 1235 AD. As many as 250 people lived there.

The village is largely unexcavated, though there was a brief excavation during 1958 and 1959 conducted by the University of Utah as part of the Glen Canyon Dam Project. During that excavation, archeologists uncovered thousands of artifacts and discovered a community of about 90 rooms divided into two separate one-story apartment complexes. An L-shaped building has been reconstructed and can be entered into by visitors. The cluster featured open shelters for working in the shade, storage pits, and adobe pit houses large enough for five or six residents. Altogether, about 100 structures have been found.

Evidence, such as singed structural building supports, suggests that the town was abandoned after a village-wide fire. There was also a serious drought occurring in the region during that time that may have also been a factor.

== See also ==
- List of museums in Utah
