= Mark Jensen =

American football player (born 1976)

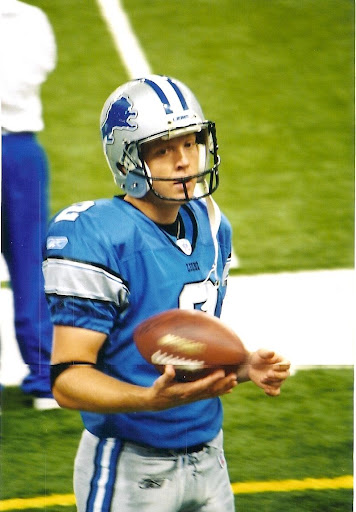
- Jensen with the Detroit Lions in 2003

Profile
- Position: Kicker

Personal information
- Born: July 11, 1976 (age 50); Oregon City, Oregon, U.S.
- Listed height: 6 ft 3 in (1.91 m)
- Listed weight: 200 lb (91 kg)

Career information
- College: California
- NFL draft: 2003: undrafted

Career history
- 2003: Detroit Lions*
- 2004: St. Louis Rams*
- 2004: Scottish Claymores
- 2004: Oakland Raiders*
- * Offseason or practice squad member only

Mark Jensen (born July 11, 1976) is an American former football placekicker for the National Football League. He spent time with three different NFL teams: the Detroit Lions, St. Louis Rams and Oakland Raiders. He also spent one year (2004) in NFL Europe, playing for the now defunct Scottish Claymores.

Jensen served for three years as Cal Football's Director of Player Development. He holds dual American/Danish citizenship.

== Early life ==
Jensen earned first-team Utah All-State two times (1993–1994) at Pleasant Grove High School. In 1993, he kicked a game-winning field goal in the Utah 4A state-championship game to lift Pleasant Grove High School over Judge Memorial High School 18-17. Following his senior campaign, he was named USA Today second-team ALL-American.

Following graduation from high school, Jensen served a two-year mission for the Church of Jesus Christ of Latter-day Saints in Leipzig, Germany.

== College career ==
At the University of California, Berkeley, Jensen was a four-year starter, handling both field goals and kick offs from 1999-2002. Jensen continued in a long line of Cal greats including Ray Wersching, Jim Breech, Doug Brien, Ryan Longwell, and Nick Harris. He holds the Golden Bears’ modern day scoring record with 107 points (2002), consecutive PATs (72) and most PATs in a game (10) Jensen also hold the Cal and Pac-10 record for most field goals in a game (5) versus Air Force in 2002. He converted on field goals of 50 and 51 yards out, registering the fifth and seventh-longest field goals in Golden Bear history.

He graduated with a BA in Development Studies in 2001 after only three years of college. He completed his master's degree in Education (Language, Literacy, Society & Culture emphasis) also at Berkeley.

2002 emerged as one of the nations most prolific kickers. Among his 2002 honors, he was named one of 20 Semi-Finalists for the Lou Groza Collegiate Placekicker Award. He was named the Pac-10 Special teams player of the week after kicking a Pac-10 record 5 field goals versus Air Force. He set a school record for points (107), while his 8.92 ppg average was second in the Pac-10 and 17th nationally. He was First-team 2002 Pac-10 All-Academic. He finished his Cal career as the school's fourth All-Time leading scorer.

Jensen's Cal career statistics:

| Year | FG | FGA | XP | XPA | PTS |
|---|---|---|---|---|---|
| 1999 | 4 | 8 | 12 | 13 | 24 |
| 2000 | 11 | 16 | 25 | 26 | 58 |
| 2001 | 11 | 14 | 22 | 22 | 55 |
| 2002 | 19 | 27 | 50 | 51 | 107 |
| TOTALS | 45 | 65 | 109 | 112 | 244 |

== NFL and post-NFL careers ==
Jensen signed a free agent contract with the Detroit Lions following the 2003 NFL draft, but was waived during training camp after injuring his groin versus the Pittsburgh Steelers. While with Detroit, he connected on a 33-yard field goal versus theSteelers as well as going 2-2 on extra points. A year later, he was signed by the St. Louis Rams and subsequently allocated to play in NFL Europe. After handling all kick-off duties for the Scottish Claymores, Jensen returned to St. Louis only to be subsequently released. He was signed immediately by the Oakland Raiders and joined them for camp. Once again, Jensen reinjured his groin and after taking an injury settlement was released by the Raiders. Jensen has also had tryouts with the San Francisco 49ers, Buffalo Bills, and NY Jets.

He worked in student-athlete development for Cal Football where he oversaw all aspects "off the field" for Cal players, including academics, housing, community relations, alumni relations, player employment, and admissions.

Jensen established Mark Jensen Kicking, which led to working with hundreds of high school, college, and professional kickers and punters. He tutored NFL kickers: Andrew Franks, Giorgio Tavecchio, Justin Medlock, Chris Kluwe.

He now is in sales for Stryker Corporation. In 2016 was named Stryker’s #1 overall hip rep in the country, winning the prestigious Grand Champions Award.
