= Sandy Co-op Block =

- U.S. National Register of Historic Places
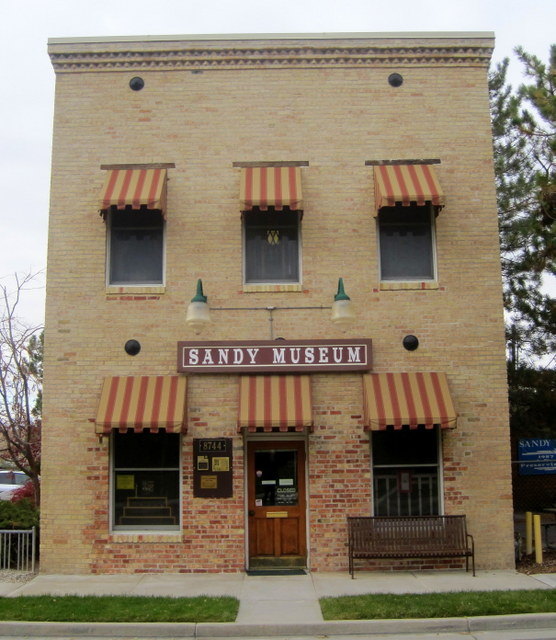

- Location within Utah Location within the United States
- Location: 8750 S. Center St. (150 East), Sandy, Utah
- Coordinates: 40°35′33″N 111°53′5″W
- Area: 0.1 acres (0.040 ha)
- Built: 1889
- Architectural style: Mid 19th Century Revival
- MPS: Sandy City MPS
- NRHP reference No.: 92001060
- Added to NRHP: August 28, 1992

The Sandy Co-op Block, located at 8750 South Center St. (150 East), in Sandy, Utah, was built in 1889 and was originally a ZCMI shop. Known later as Sandy Museum, it was listed on the National Register of Historic Places in 1992.

Its 1992 NRHP nomination asserted it is important "as a distinct and important type of commercial structure which was common in Sandy City in the latter half of the nineteenth century. This structure is the only remaining two-story commercial block from Sandy's original commercial district." It is associated with the mining, smelting, and small farm era of Sandy. Sandy had been connected by railroad in 1871.
