= Boulder, Utah =

Town in the state of Utah, United States

- Town
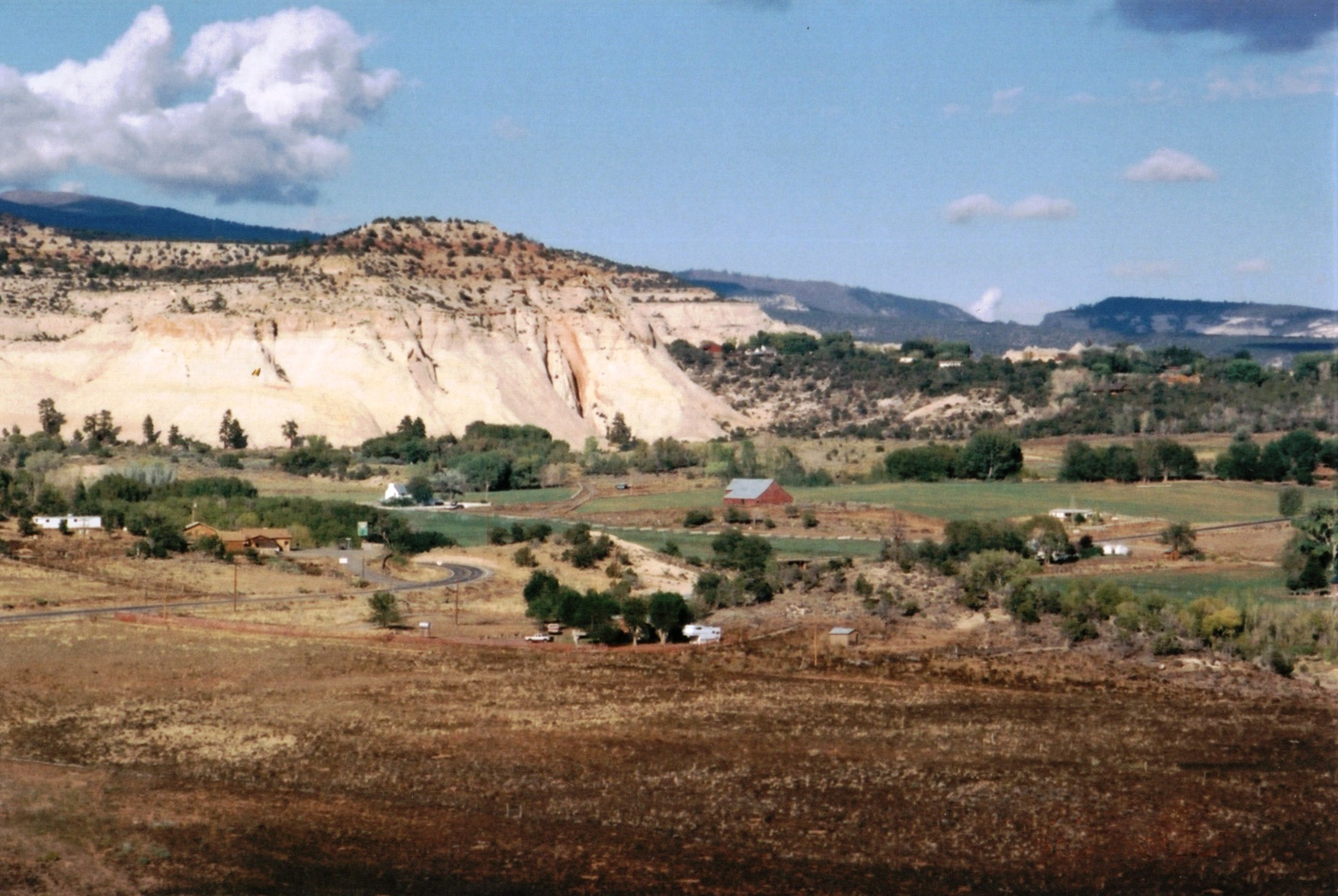
- From the Hogsback of Highway 12, the ranching and farming community of Boulder nestles amidst rugged terrain.

- Location in Garfield County and state of Utah.
- Coordinates: 37°55′28″N 111°25′34″W
- Country: United States
- State: Utah
- County: Garfield
- Settled: c. 1890
- Named after: Boulder Mountain

Government
  - Town Clerk: Jessica LeFevre
  - Deputy Town Clerk: Lacy Allen

Area
  - Total: 20.93 sq mi (54.22 km^{2})
  - Land: 20.93 sq mi (54.22 km^{2})
  - Water: 0 sq mi (0.00 km^{2})
- Elevation: 6,700 ft (2,000 m)

Population (2020)
  - Total: 227
  - Estimate (2019): 241
  - Density: 11.5/sq mi (4.44/km^{2})
- Time zone: UTC-7 (MST)
  - Summer (DST): UTC-6 (MDT)
- ZIP code: 84716
- Area code: 435
- FIPS code: 49-07470
- GNIS feature ID: 1437510

Boulder is a town in Garfield County, Utah, United States, 27 miles (44 km) northeast of Escalante on Utah Scenic Byway 12 at its intersection with the Burr Trail. As of the 2020 census, the town population was 227.

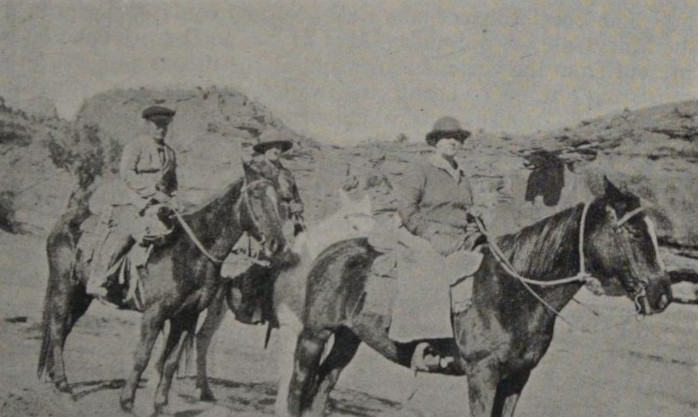
Reflecting the town's isolation, leaders of the Garfield County regional LDS Church women's organization are shown on horseback in 1925 for a visit to their members in Boulder

Boulder was isolated from other communities until the Civilian Conservation Corps built a road from Escalante, and did not get electric power until 1947. The town marks the western terminus of Burr Trail, a mostly paved road that runs eastward through red rock country to the Waterpocket Fold in Capitol Reef National Park. Boulder is the home of Anasazi Indian State Park.

== Geography ==
Boulder is near Grand Staircase–Escalante National Monument and Capitol Reef National Park.

According to the United States Census Bureau, the town has a total area of 20.9 square miles (54.2 km^{2}), all land. Boulder also has many sandstone formations, such as small mountains and slopes.

=== Trails and byways ===
The American Discovery Trail bicycle alternate route runs through Boulder.

=== Climate ===
According to the Köppen Climate Classification system, Boulder has a semi-arid climate, abbreviated "BSk" on climate maps. The hottest temperature recorded in Boulder was 97 °F (36.1 °C) on June 16, 2021, while the coldest temperature recorded was −17 °F (−27.2 °C) on February 6, 1989.

Climate data for Boulder, Utah, 1991–2020 normals, extremes 1954–present
Month	Jan	Feb	Mar	Apr	May	Jun	Jul	Aug	Sep	Oct	Nov	Dec	Year
Record high °F (°C)	63 (17)	69 (21)	75 (24)	82 (28)	89 (32)	97 (36)	96 (36)	95 (35)	93 (34)	85 (29)	71 (22)	65 (18)	97 (36)
Mean maximum °F (°C)	50.7 (10.4)	56.1 (13.4)	66.9 (19.4)	73.9 (23.3)	80.9 (27.2)	88.7 (31.5)	91.6 (33.1)	89.0 (31.7)	84.9 (29.4)	75.6 (24.2)	62.5 (16.9)	52.3 (11.3)	92.1 (33.4)
Mean daily maximum °F (°C)	39.5 (4.2)	43.6 (6.4)	52.8 (11.6)	59.7 (15.4)	68.1 (20.1)	78.8 (26.0)	83.6 (28.7)	81.2 (27.3)	74.0 (23.3)	62.4 (16.9)	49.3 (9.6)	39.3 (4.1)	61.0 (16.1)
Daily mean °F (°C)	30.4 (−0.9)	34.1 (1.2)	41.7 (5.4)	47.7 (8.7)	56.4 (13.6)	66.6 (19.2)	72.4 (22.4)	70.4 (21.3)	63.0 (17.2)	51.5 (10.8)	39.5 (4.2)	30.2 (−1.0)	50.3 (10.2)
Mean daily minimum °F (°C)	21.3 (−5.9)	24.5 (−4.2)	30.7 (−0.7)	35.8 (2.1)	44.6 (7.0)	54.4 (12.4)	61.2 (16.2)	59.6 (15.3)	52.0 (11.1)	40.5 (4.7)	29.6 (−1.3)	21.1 (−6.1)	39.6 (4.2)
Mean minimum °F (°C)	5.2 (−14.9)	9.3 (−12.6)	15.7 (−9.1)	21.5 (−5.8)	29.7 (−1.3)	38.8 (3.8)	50.3 (10.2)	49.8 (9.9)	36.7 (2.6)	23.7 (−4.6)	12.4 (−10.9)	3.2 (−16.0)	3.1 (−16.1)
Record low °F (°C)	−16 (−27)	−17 (−27)	0 (−18)	8 (−13)	20 (−7)	27 (−3)	32 (0)	34 (1)	24 (−4)	4 (−16)	−1 (−18)	−11 (−24)	−17 (−27)
Average precipitation inches (mm)	1.07 (27)	1.05 (27)	0.91 (23)	0.51 (13)	0.72 (18)	0.38 (9.7)	1.11 (28)	1.73 (44)	1.58 (40)	1.44 (37)	0.56 (14)	0.79 (20)	11.85 (300.7)
Average snowfall inches (cm)	15.7 (40)	10.8 (27)	6.7 (17)	2.3 (5.8)	0.4 (1.0)	0.0 (0.0)	0.0 (0.0)	0.0 (0.0)	0.0 (0.0)	0.5 (1.3)	3.5 (8.9)	11.7 (30)	51.6 (131)
Average precipitation days (≥ 0.01 in)	5.5	6.1	4.6	4.3	5.4	2.8	8.1	9.8	6.9	5.2	3.1	5.2	67.0
Average snowy days (≥ 0.1 in)	4.0	3.9	2.2	0.8	0.2	0.0	0.0	0.0	0.0	0.2	1.2	3.8	16.3
Source 1: NOAA
Source 2: National Weather Service

== Demographics ==
Historical population
Census	Pop.	Note	%±
1900	104		—
1910	91		−12.5%
1920	177		94.5%
1930	192		8.5%
1940	216		12.5%
1950	197		−8.8%
1960	108		−45.2%
1970	93		−13.9%
1980	113		21.5%
1990	126		11.5%
2000	180		42.9%
2010	226		25.6%
2020	227		0.4%
U.S. Decennial Census

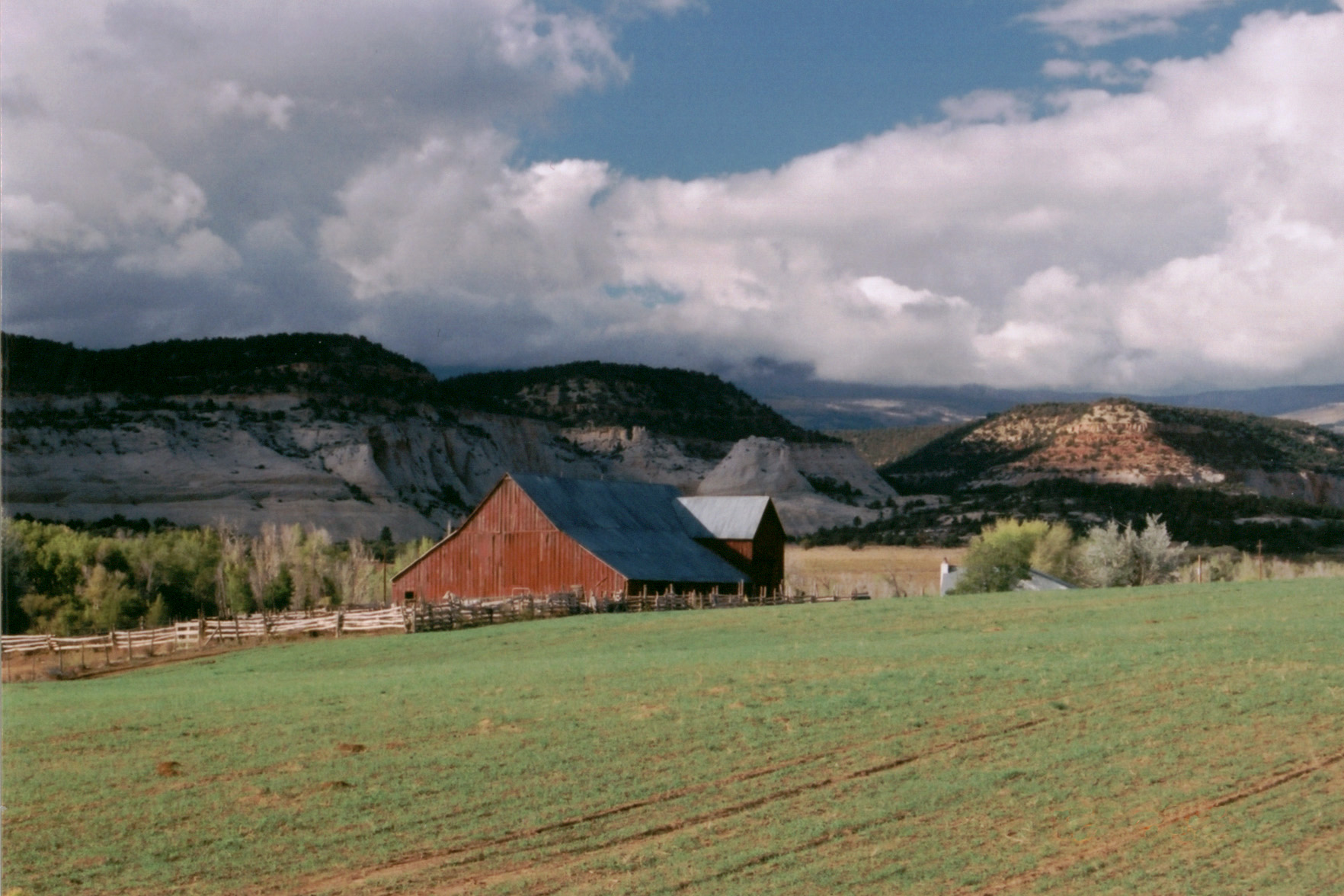
Barn outside of Boulder

As of the census of 2000, there were 180 people, 65 households, and 41 families residing in the town. The population density was 8.6 people per square mile (3.3/km^{2}). There were 102 housing units at an average density of 4.9 per square mile (1.9/km^{2}). The racial makeup of the town was 96.67% White, 1.11% Asian, 0% African American, 0% Native American, 0% Pacific Islander, 0% from other races, and 2.22% from two or more races. Hispanic or Latino of any race were 1.11% of the population.

There were 65 households, out of which 33.8% had children under 18 living with them, 52.3% were married couples living together, 4.6% had a female householder with no husband present, and 36.9% were non-families. 27.7% of all households were made up of individuals, and 9.2% had someone living alone who was 65 years of age or older. The average household size was 2.77, and the average family size was 3.54.

In the town, the population was spread out, with 30.0% under 18, 11.1% from 18 to 24, 26.7% from 25 to 44, 21.1% from 45 to 64, and 11.1% who were 65 years of age or older. The median age was 34 years. For every 100 females, there were 104.5 males. For every 100 females aged 18 and over, there were 103.2 males.

The median income for a household in the town was $30,000, and the median income for a family was $31,429. Males had a median income of $20,750 versus $12,083 for females. The per capita income for the town was $9,583. About 15.2% of families and 13.3% of the population were below the poverty line, including 6.5% of those under eighteen and 14.3% of those 65 or over.
