= Ott Planetarium =

Planetarium in Utah, United States

Coordinates: 41°11′41″N 111°56′24″W

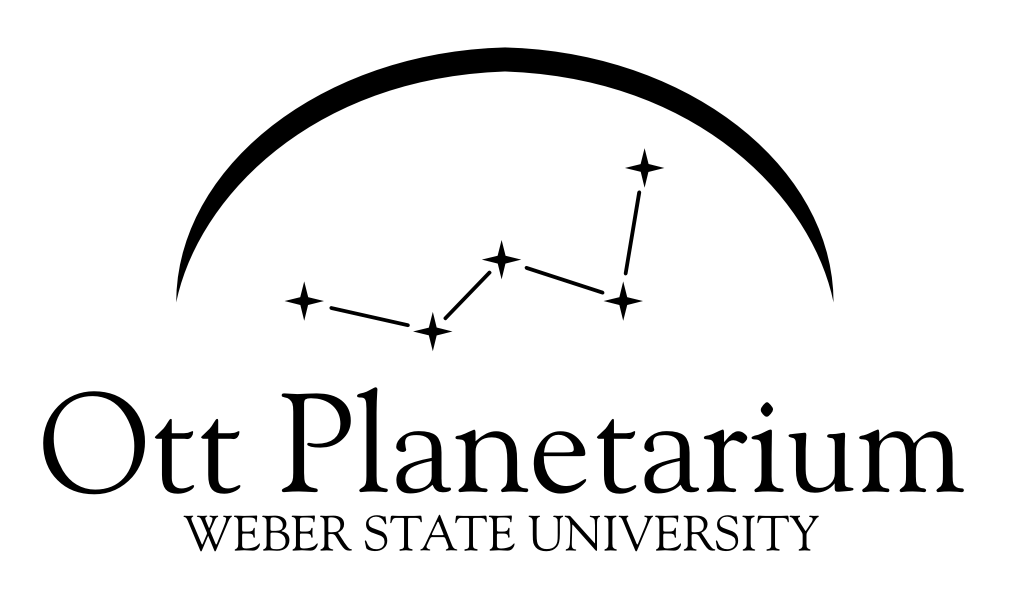
The Ott Planetarium Logo features the constellation Cassiopeia, a great "W" in the northern sky above Weber State University.

The Ott Planetarium is a planetarium at Weber State University in Ogden, Utah, USA. The facility is named for Layton P. Ott and the Ott family. The planetarium is operated by university students and is a place of learning for audiences and staff alike.

== The Facility ==
The Ott Planetarium star theater seats 60 persons under a 9.1 meter (30 foot) diameter perforated aluminum dome. Images and video are projected onto the dome with a single projector located in the center of the room. The star theater is equipped with 5.1 channel surround sound.

In December 2004 the Ott Planetarium upgraded its main projection system from a 1969 Spitz A4 to a Konica Minolta Mediaglobe fulldome video system. The Mediaglobe upgrade replaced the star projector and over 30 slide and special effects projectors. Shortly after the Mediaglobe upgrade, planetarium staff began producing original content in the new digital format.

In 2006 the planetarium received a $1 Million U.S. Congressional Earmark to fund the development of educational programs. Part of this grant was used to purchase a 128 CPU render cluster and workstations for star show production.

== Star Shows ==
The Ott Planetarium offers star shows to the public through its public events program. The planetarium is a popular field trip destination - the star theater can be reserved for classes, groups, family outings, Boy Scouts and Girl Scouts. The Ott Planetarium serves over 20,000 people per year through field trips, public nights, and other public programs.

== Original Productions ==
The Ott Planetarium produces original fulldome content with a stated commitment to scientific accuracy and educational effectiveness.

Astro Otters and Astro Otters Jr. are module-based astronomy education programs. The population and sequence of these modules can be altered to meet the astronomy curriculum requirements of states or provinces. The Astro Otters program modules were produced with Blender 3D.

Cosmic Journey features images from NASA's Great Observatories, including the Hubble Space Telescope and the Spitzer Space Telescope. The show is narrated by astrophysicist, Dr. Stacy Palen. Cosmic Journey was produced with Blender 3D and uses a 3D adaptation of the Ken Burns Effect.
