= Tooele Carnegie Library =

- U.S. National Register of Historic Places
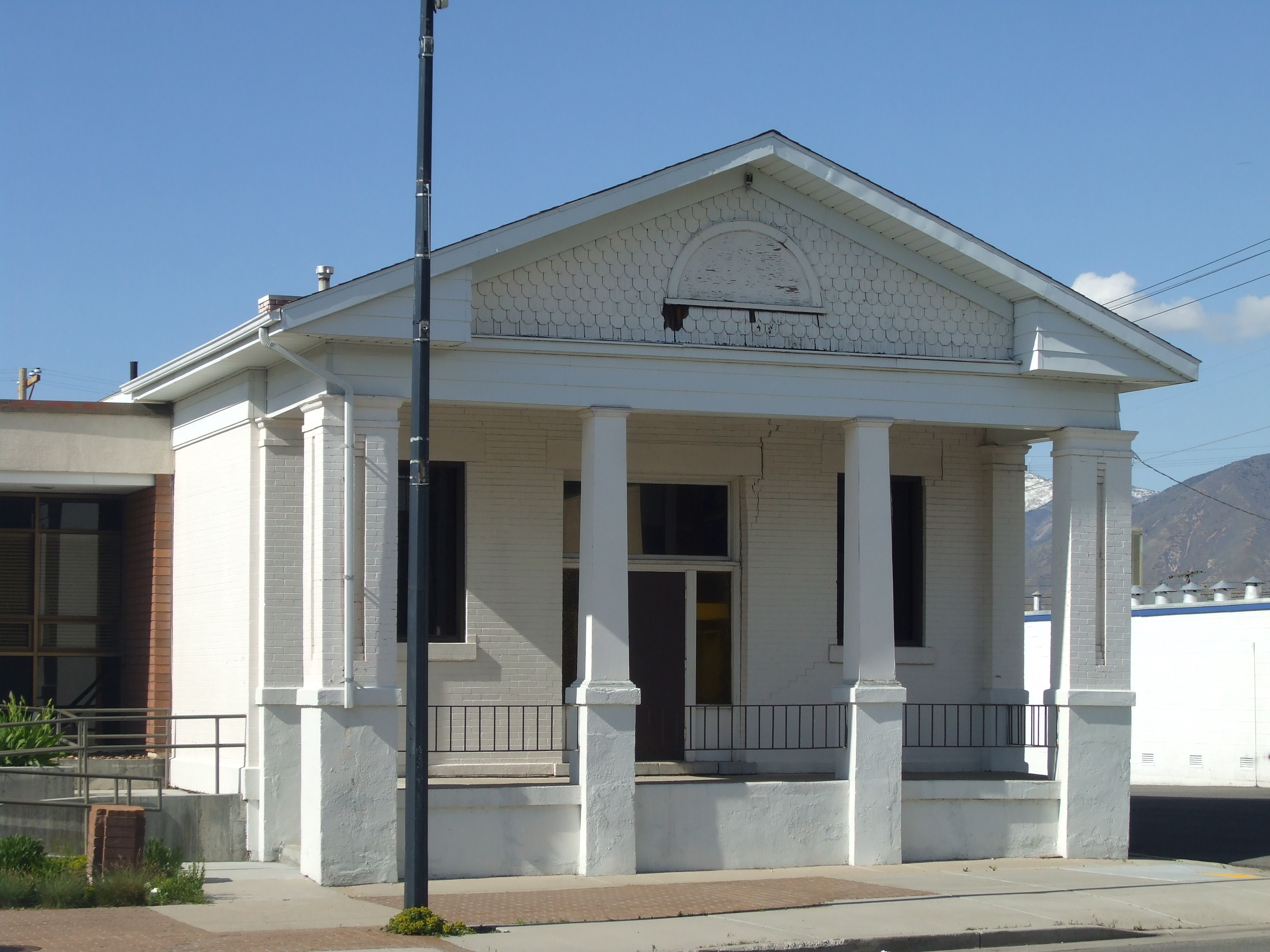

- Location within Utah Location within the United States
- Location: 47 E. Vine St., Tooele, Utah
- Coordinates: 40°31′52″N 112°17′48″W
- Area: 0.3 acres (0.12 ha)
- Built: 1911
- Built by: Miller, Julius & Olaf
- Architect: Ulmer, Frank M.
- Architectural style: Classical Revival
- MPS: Carnegie Library TR
- NRHP reference No.: 84000420
- Added to NRHP: October 29, 1984

The Tooele Carnegie Library, located at 47 E. Vine St. in Tooele, Utah, United States, was built in 1911 and includes Classical Revival architecture. It was listed on the National Register of Historic Places in 1984.

It was funded by a $5,000 Carnegie grant. As of 1984, it was one of 16 surviving Carnegie libraries out of 23 that had been funded in Utah.

It is adjacent to the Tooele County Courthouse and City Hall, which is also NRHP-listed.

== Tooele Pioneer Museum ==
The building now houses the Tooele Pioneer Museum, which displays pioneer artifacts including a replica covered wagon and handcart, and some Native American artifacts. Other displays include written histories, photos and portraits. The museum is operated by the Sons of Utah Pioneers. Admission is free.

The museum is located adjacent to the Daughters of Utah Pioneers Museum and Log Cabin, which as displays pioneer artifacts.

The combined buildings are known as Pioneer Plaza.
