= West Jordan Ward Meetinghouse =

Historic church in Utah, United States

- U.S. National Register of Historic Places
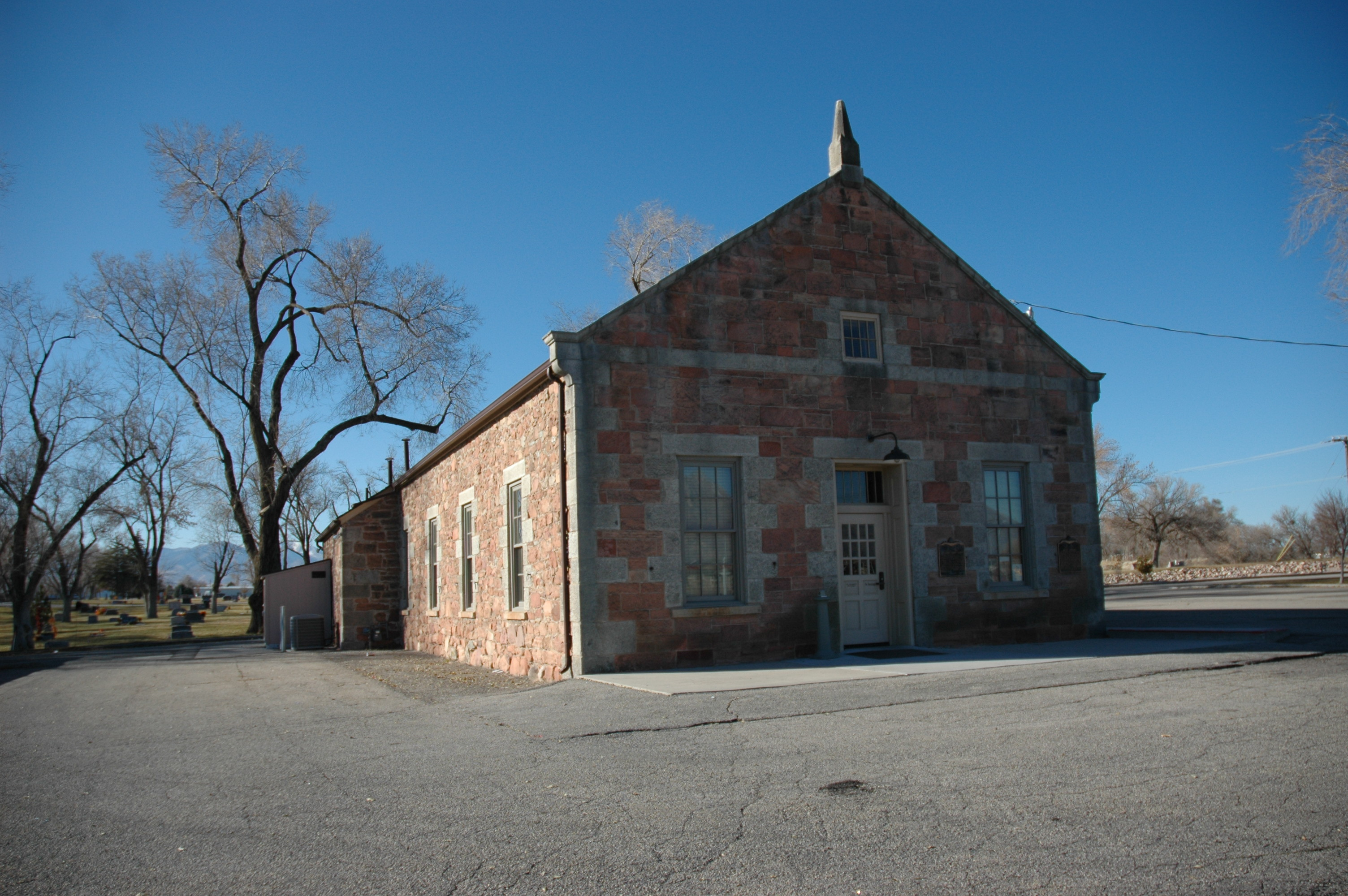

- Location within Utah Location within the United States
- Location: 1140 W. 7800 South, West Jordan, Utah
- Coordinates: 40°36′28″N 111°55′27″W
- Area: 1.2 acres (0.49 ha)
- Built: 1867
- Architect: Morris, Elias
- Architectural style: Classical Revival
- NRHP reference No.: 95000415
- Added to NRHP: April 14, 1995

The West Jordan Ward Meetinghouse, at 1140 W. 7800 South in West Jordan, Utah, was designed and built in 1867 by Elias Morris as a Mormon meetinghouse, in a style that was later termed a "first-phase meetinghouse". Since also known as D.U.P. Pioneer Hall, it includes Classical Revival. As of 1995, it was historically significant as the sole remaining church and public building in West Jordan.

It was listed on the National Register of Historic Places in 1995.
