= Tooele County Courthouse and City Hall =

- U.S. National Register of Historic Places
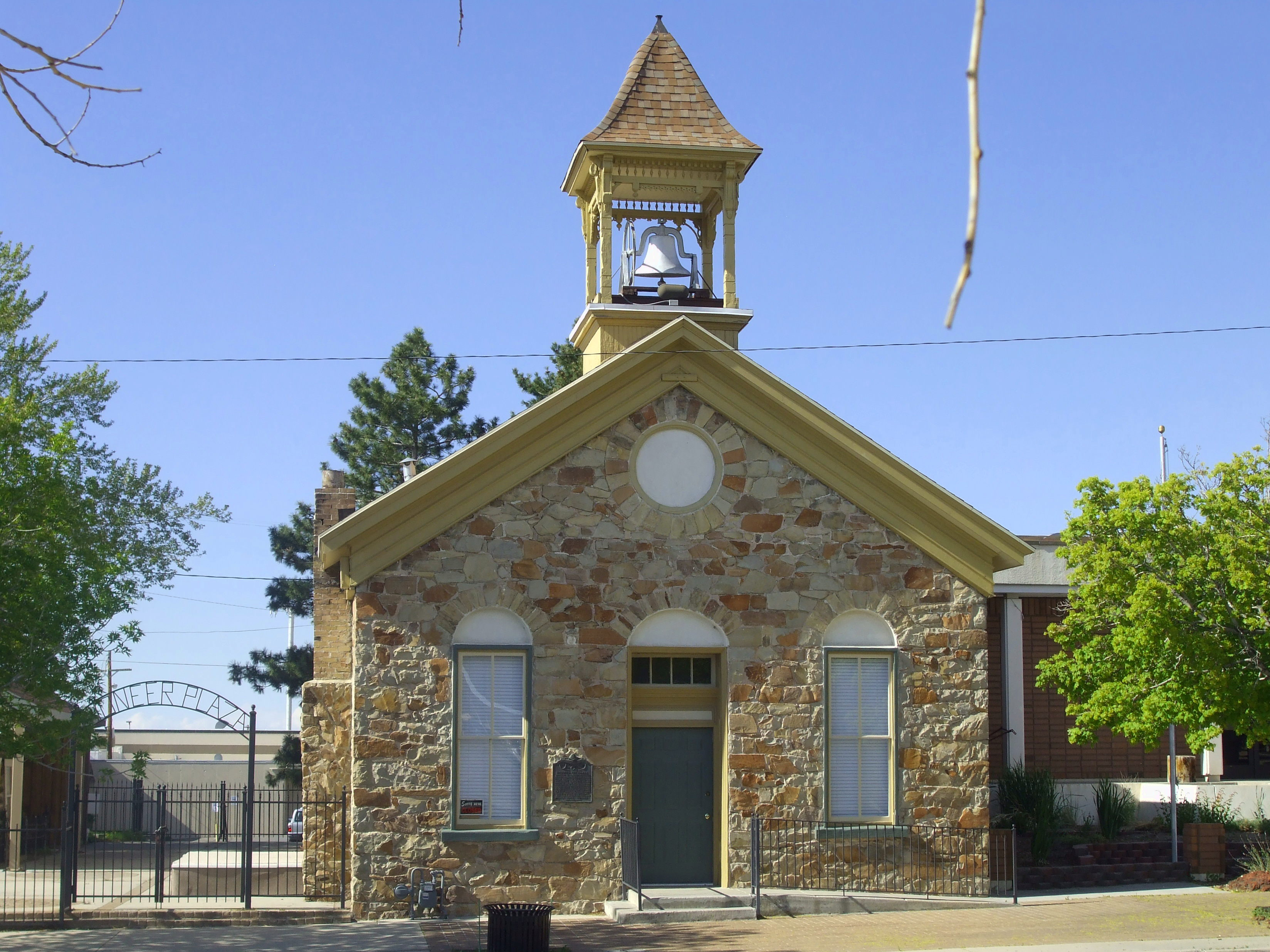

- Location within Utah Location within the United States
- Location: 39 E. Vine St., Tooele, Utah
- Coordinates: 40°31′51″N 112°17′51″W
- Area: less than one acre
- Built: 1867
- Built by: Isaac Lee
- Architectural style: Greek Revival
- NRHP reference No.: 83003194
- Added to NRHP: July 21, 1983

The Tooele County Courthouse and City Hall, located at 39 E. Vine St. in Tooele, Utah, was built in 1867. It includes Greek Revival-inspired architecture. It was listed on the National Register of Historic Places in 1983.

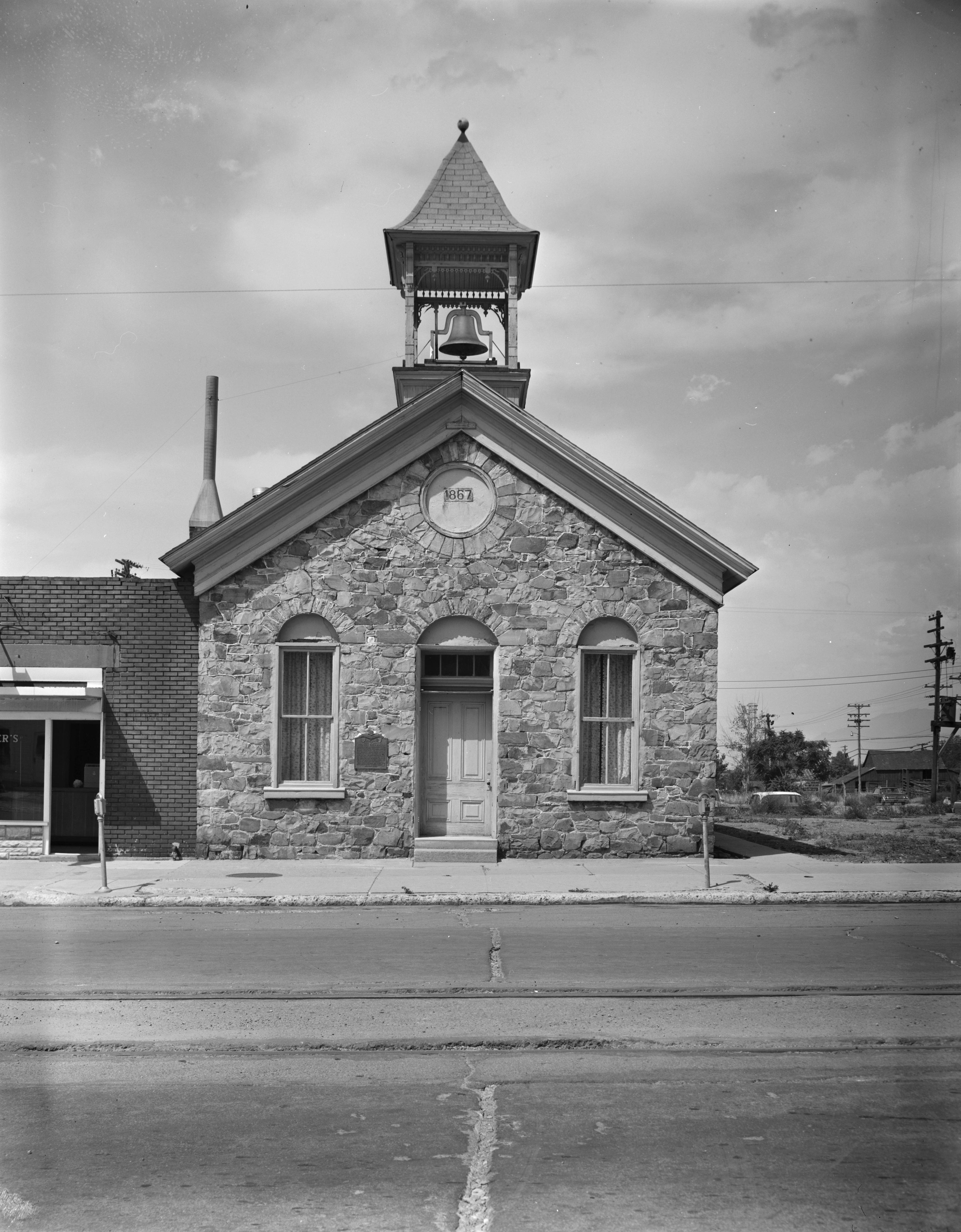
1968 HABS photo

It is significant as the earliest (as known in 1983) and only surviving "temple-form" city hall in the state of Utah. According to its NRHP nomination, the "temple-form, which typically has its short end to the street and a pedimented gable facade in imitation of monumental classical buildings, originated in the Greek Revival period of American building, and was the first and most common building type used in Utah's early public buildings." The building served as courthouse and city hall from 1867 to 1899 and continued as city hall until 1944.

== Daughters of Utah Pioneers Museum ==
The building now houses the Daughters of Utah Pioneers Museum, which is one of many museum in Utah operated by the Daughters of Utah Pioneers. The museum displays pioneer memorabilia and personal effects, furnishings, musical instruments, pioneer portraits, photos and more. A historic log cabin is located adjacent to the courthouse and is part of the museum.

The museum is located adjacent to the Tooele Pioneer Museum, operated by the Sons of Utah Pioneers, which also displays pioneer and Native American artifacts.

The combined buildings are known as Pioneer Plaza.
