= Pleasant Grove School (Pleasant Grove, Utah) =

- U.S. National Register of Historic Places
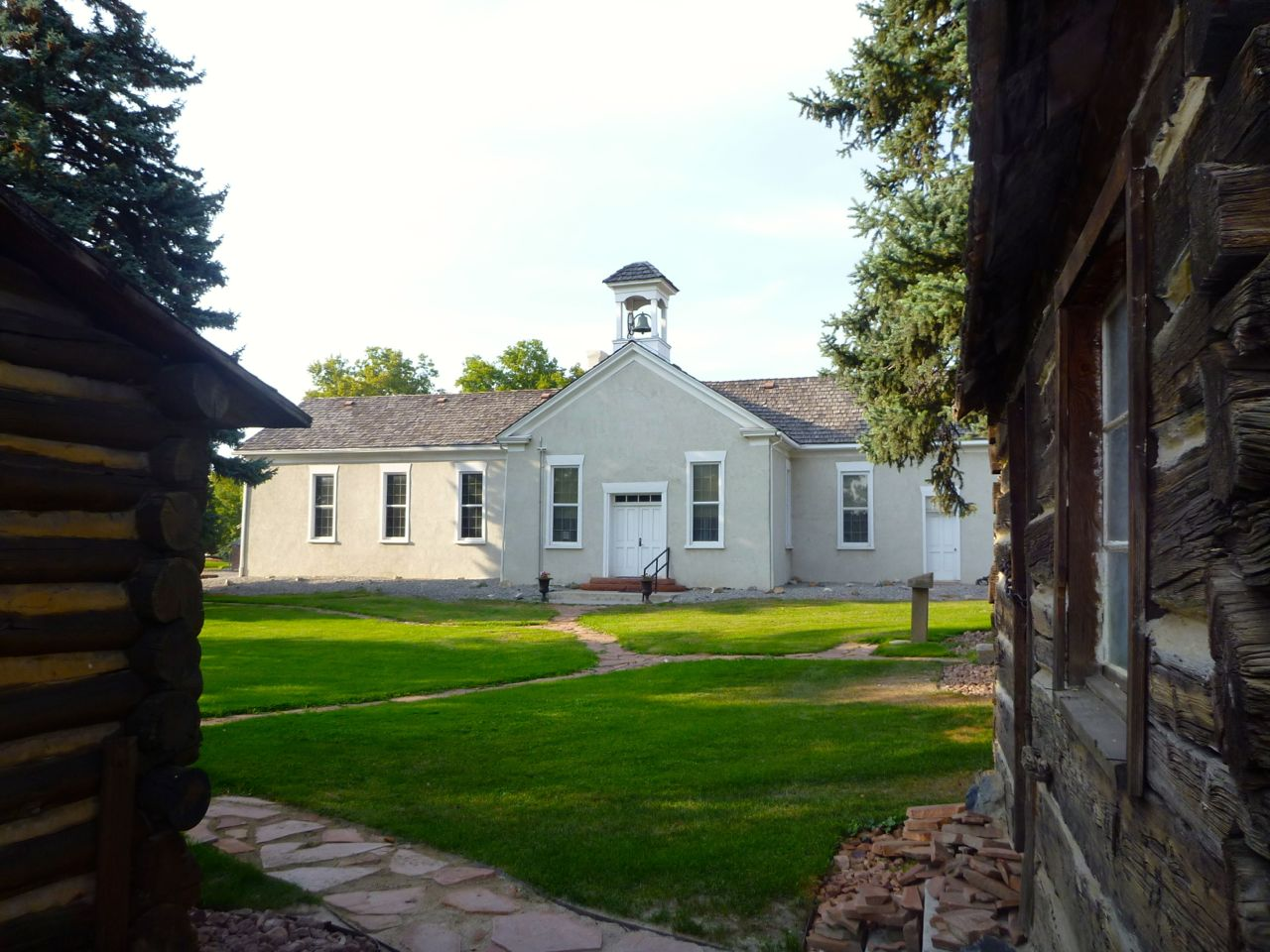

- Location within Utah Location within the United States
- Location: 65 South 100 East, Pleasant Grove, Utah
- Coordinates: 40°21′46.8″N 111°44′18.5″W
- Area: less than one acre
- Built: 1861
- Architect: Greenhalgh, Henry
- NRHP reference No.: 80003978
- Added to NRHP: February 20, 1980

The Pleasant Grove School, also known as the Old Bell School, at 65 South 100 East in Pleasant Grove, Utah was built in 1861. It was listed on the National Register of Historic Places in 1980.

It was designed by English-born Henry Greenhalgh with an arched ceiling that provided good acoustics, and was built by mason William H. Adams, Sr., and carpenter William Paul.

After lower grades had moved out, the building served as an early home for Pleasant Grove High School. It was later used by the city government for a variety of civic purposes, including a library. In 1940, part of the building was leased to the Daughters of Utah Pioneers for a museum. In September 1946, the old school structure and its newly developed park grounds were officially dedicated as a permanent pioneer memorial building and park.
