= National Register of Historic Places listings in Iron County, Utah =

Location of Iron County in Utah

This is a list of the National Register of Historic Places listings in Iron County, Utah.

This is intended to be a complete list of the properties and districts on the National Register of Historic Places in Iron County, Utah, United States. Latitude and longitude coordinates are provided for many National Register properties and districts; these locations may be seen together in a map.

There are 18 properties and districts listed on the National Register in the county. Two other sites in the county were once listed on the Register, but have since been removed.

This National Park Service list is complete through NPS recent listings posted March 21, 2025.

== Current listings ==
	Name on the Register	Image	Date listed	Location	City or town	Description
1	Caretaker's Cabin	Caretaker's Cabin	August 4, 1983 (#83004385)	Off State Route 14; 37°36′55″N 112°50′12″W	Cedar City	
2	Cedar City Historic District	Cedar City Historic District	July 7, 2004 (#04000677)	Roughly bounded by 100 West and 300 West, College Ave., and 400 South; 37°40′23″N 113°03′51″W	Cedar City	
3	Cedar City Railroad Depot	Cedar City Railroad Depot	August 9, 1984 (#84002184)	220 N. Main St. 37°40′53″N 113°03′41″W	Cedar City	
4	Ensign-Smith House	Ensign-Smith House	May 19, 1983 (#83004400)	96 N. Main St. 37°53′12″N 112°46′26″W	Paragonah	
5	Evans Mound (42IN40)		October 24, 1985 (#85003387)	Address Restricted	Summit	
6	Gold Spring		July 21, 1977 (#77001305)	Address Restricted	Modena	
7	Long Flat Site		November 1, 1979 (#79002496)	Address Restricted	Parowan	
8	William and Julia Lyman House	William and Julia Lyman House	April 6, 2000 (#00000355)	191 S. Main St. 37°50′22″N 112°49′35″W	Parowan	
9	Meeks-Green Farmstead	Meeks-Green Farmstead	April 15, 1994 (#94000295)	Approximately 40 N. 400 West; 37°50′34″N 112°50′08″W	Parowan	
10	Modena Elementary School	Modena Elementary School	April 1, 1985 (#85000806)	About 150 N. Main St. 37°48′00″N 113°55′29″W	Modena	
11	Old Irontown	Old Irontown	May 14, 1971 (#71000843)	About 22 miles (35 km) west of Cedar City, 3 miles (4.8 km) south of State Route 56; 37°36′00″N 113°26′56″W	Cedar City	
12	Old Main and Science Buildings	Old Main and Science Buildings	August 21, 1984 (#84002186)	Southern Utah University campus 37°40′32″N 113°04′03″W	Cedar City	
13	Daniel R. and Sophia G. Page House	Daniel R. and Sophia G. Page House	May 9, 1985 (#85000961)	Richie Flat at the western edge of the Harmony Mountains; 37°34′03″N 113°25′24″W	Newcastle	
14	Parowan Gap Petroglyphs	Parowan Gap Petroglyphs	October 10, 1975 (#75001806)	10.5 miles (16.9 km) west of Main Street in Parowan; 37°54′35″N 112°59′07″W	Parowan	
15	Parowan Meetinghouse	Parowan Meetinghouse	May 6, 1976 (#76001818)	Center block of Main St., between Center and 100 South St. 37°50′28″N 112°49′41″W	Parowan	
16	Jesse N. Smith House	Jesse N. Smith House	June 20, 1975 (#75001807)	45 W. 100 South; 37°50′24″N 112°49′39″W	Parowan	
17	US Post Office-Cedar City Main	US Post Office-Cedar City Main	November 27, 1989 (#89001993)	10 N. Main St. 37°40′39″N 113°03′39″W	Cedar City	Now houses city offices
18	Visitor Center	Visitor Center	August 4, 1983 (#83004386)	Off State Route 14; 37°37′09″N 112°50′12″W	Cedar City	

== Former listing ==
	Name on the Register	Image	Date listed	Date removed	Location	City or town	Description
1	Joseph S. Hunter House		February 11, 1982 (#82004126)	February 21, 2007	86 E. Center St.(Original location. Now located at:); 37°41′20″N 113°03′48″W	Cedar City	Delisted when the house was moved to Iron Mission State Park.
2	George H. Wood House		November 14, 1978 (#78002662)	August 15, 2023	432 N. Main St. 37°41′06″N 113°03′39″W	Cedar City	

== See also ==
- List of National Historic Landmarks in Utah
- National Register of Historic Places listings in Utah
