= Columbia Steel Company =

American steel company

Columbia Steel Company was an American steel company, incorporated in Nevada on October 1 1909 with a capital of $500,000. The company built a plant in Pittsburg, California. The company was acquired by U.S. Steel in 1930 and later merged with Geneva Steel to form U.S. Steel's Columbia-Geneva Steel Division. In 1986, U.S. Steel created USS-POSCO Industries as a joint venture with Pohang Iron and Steel Company to run the Pittsburg facility. U.S. Steel announced the closure of the Pittsburg plant in 2022.

== History ==
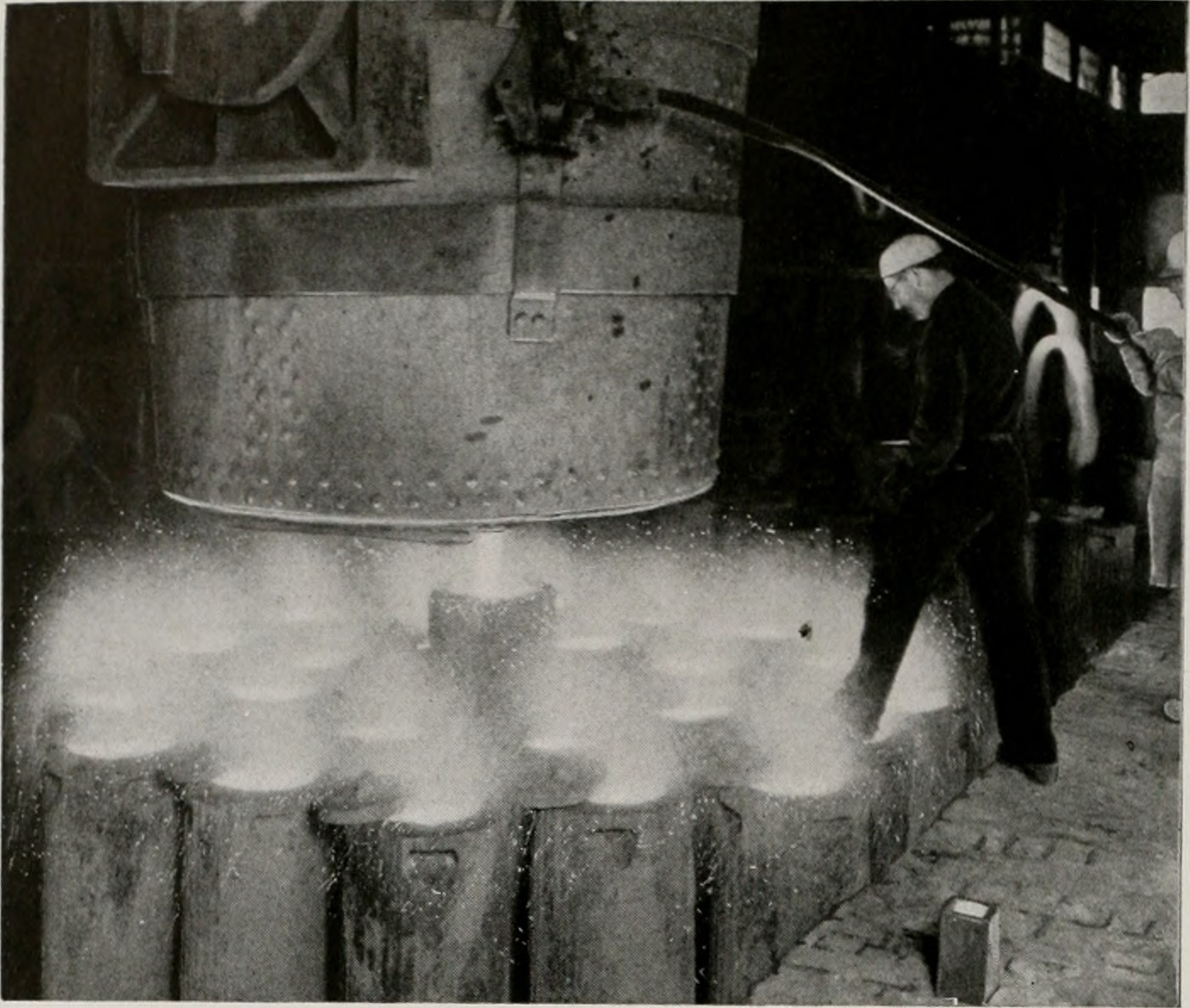
Molten steel at the company's Pittsburg plant c. 1933

Columbia Steel Company was established around 1909, opening a plant in Pittsburg, California. (Note: A 1917 Iron Trade Review article states that the company was organized in 1909, with offices in San Francisco, as a successor to a prior company in Portland, Oregon. Other sources give the company's date of establishment as 1908 or 1910.) On November 22, 1910 the first heat was poured from the open-hearth furnace and during the first year of operation 226 heats were poured aggregating 3,500 tons of steel. Iron Trade Review reported in 1917 that the company operated two plants—one in Pittsburg (38.02877°N 121.86810°W) and another in Portland.

The Columbia Steel Corporation was incorporated on Nov 23, 1922 in Delaware. On April 1, 1923, the company acquired the steel plant of the Llewellyn Iron Works in Torrance, California.

The financing was accomplished through an issue of $4 million in 15-year 7% bonds dated Feb 1, 1923. At the end of 1923 there were also $7,241,842 outstanding out of an authorized issue of $10 million of 7% preferred stock and 547,500 shares out of 1,000,000 of no-par common stock. The preferred had two uncommon provisions: it was redeemable at the option of the company for 10 shares of common stock for each preferred share (it was also redeemable for 105 in cash) and until Nov 1927 the dividends could be paid in common stock at the rate of 1 common share per year. This privilege was exercised until July 1, 1927 for 9 semiannual payments (and thus over time 4.5 common shares were issued per share of preferred). Beginning July 1, 1927 cash dividends were paid on the preferred stock.

Columbia Steel became a subsidiary of U.S. Steel in 1930. U.S. Steel had acquired a 90-day option on the company and was appraising assets. The option was to expire on October 29, 1929, but in the turmoil of the Wall Street crash of 1929 it was extended for 48 hours and was exercised on October 31. USS acquired the company for $46,630,000. The transaction was ratified by Columbia stockholders on January 27, 1930, assets were transferred on Jan 31 and the Columbia Steel Corporation was dissolved. For a short time the assets were under the control of USS's Pacific Coast sales division, the U.S. Steel Products Co. until on July 1, 1930 the Pacific Coast distribution business and the former Columbia properties were transferred to a new USS subsidiary, the Columbia Steel Co. of Delaware having a capital of 320,000 par $100 shares, all owned by USS.

Under USS ownership the company served as a contractor in the construction of the San Francisco–Oakland Bay Bridge in the 1930s.

The company expanded during World War II but faced a sharp decline in steel production after the end of the wartime manufacturing boom.

On October 1, 1946 all Utah operations were consolidated in the Geneva Steel Co. while Columbia retained control of the two steel plants in California.

Columbia Steel faced a lawsuit from the federal government over its plans to acquire the Consolidated Steel Corporation. The Supreme Court decided in the company's favor in 1948.

In 1952, Columbia Steel merged with Geneva Steel to form U.S. Steel's Columbia-Geneva Steel Division. The division was dissolved in 1964.

In 1986, U.S. Steel entered into a joint venture with Pohang Iron and Steel Company to run its plant in Pittsburg, creating USS-POSCO Industries (UPI).

U.S. Steel regained sole ownership of UPI in 2020. The company announced in 2022 that the Pittsburg facility would be shut down the following year.

== Provo blast furnace plant ==
The company acquired 600 acres north of Springville in October 1922. On June 9, 1923 large crowds gathered at the plant site and surrounding towns to celebrate the arrival of the heavy steel industry in Utah. About 300 construction workers were employed in the preparatory phase laying railroad tracks, pouring foundations, etc. The Provo Sunday Herald published a special "Steel Day" issue. On Feb 14, 1924 the coke oven battery was blown in to begin its 60-day preheating cycle. One year and one day after ground had been broken, on Apr 14, 1924, the first three coke ovens were loaded with coal. The 33 ovens were designed to each bake 13 tons of coal in 10 hours - a total of 1000 tons of coal per day. The blast furnace was blown in on April 30, 1924 at 8:30am. The first 20 tons of pig iron were tapped on May 1 at 6:30pm. The time between tappings in steady operation was 6 hours.

On July 1, 1927 work began on the second coke oven battery. A contract had been signed with International Smelting and United States Smelting for delivery of 400 tons of coke per day at their plants in Tooele and Murray. About $1 million was to be spent in Provo, about $500,000 at the coal mine. Consumers for an additional 3mmcfd of coke oven gas were sought. The 23 new ovens were first charged with coal on Jan 23, 1928. Their nameplate capacity was 16 tons of coal per day and oven. Columbia Steel was now competing with the Utah Fuel Co. and over the coming years was driving them out of business.

The No. 2 blast furnace which had been idle since WW2 was blown in by Kaiser-Frazer on May 17, 1948.

Upon a press inquiry in 1966, USS made the official announcement that the blast furnace plant, which had been completely idle since February 1962 would be closed permanently. Pig iron for the McWane iron pipe company was furnished by Geneva Steel. The No. 1 blast furnace had last been in operation in October 1960, (Note: Ironton plant taken out of operation in October 1960, due to lack of demand. No. 1 furnace was blown out July 1, 1960 for repairs.) the No. 2 furnace (Note: No. 2 furnace to be shut down Feb 24, sintering plant to continue operating. Geneva Steel is meeting all the demand for pig iron. No. 2 had been started April 1961.) and the coke ovens in February 1962. In 1966 there were no plans yet in place for dismantling the plant.

=== Adjunct businesses ===
The Republic Creosoting Co. of Indianapolis (Note: The company had plants in Indianapolis, Mobile, Norfolk, St. Louis Park and Seattle. Further Reading) concurrently with the coke oven plant completed a coal tar refinery employing 25 on a 40-acre tract adjoining beyond the railroad tracks to the west for $300,000 - $400,000. It was consuming the entire output of coal tar byproduct. The two plants were connected by a 2,600ft pipeline. Construction started end of Feb and production commenced at the end of July 1924. Creosoting plants were usually cause of environmental hazards at the time. Reilly Industries discontinued creosote oil production in early 2001. The EPA performed a cleanup of widespread contamination around 2018 (40.19911°N 111.63003°W).

In December 1924 the Utah Valley Gas & Coke Co., (Note: Incorporated in Utah Jan 26, 1915 as successor to the Utah Valley Gas & Power Company, incorporated Jan 2, 1913.) which had begun constructing the main part of their distribution system serving Provo, Springville and Spanish Fork in 1914, (Note: Company received the first $150,000 of a $500,000 6% bond issue in March 1913 for the construction of a plant and mains in Provo, $150,000 to be issued as needed. The remaining $200,000 to be issued for extensions beyond Provo. The first gas was delivered in Provo on Jan 19, 1914.) retired their own gas generators and henceforth distributed purified coke oven gas from the steel mill. Supply was greater than demand and some of the gas was flared off. Construction of the second coke oven battery exacerbated the problem and increased the opportunity, and a plan to build a 42 mile pipe line towards Salt Lake City was contemplated. In 1927, the Utah Valley Gas & Coke properties were sold to the W. B. Foshay Co, a fraudulent $20 million enterprise that went bankrupt in the wake of the 1929 crash. In May 1930 in agreement with bondholders the C. Loomis Allen interests of New York took over the business that was operating at a chronic deficit and had total assets of $830,000 and bonded debt of $490,000, the interest charges of which it could not meet in full. The former Utah Valley Gas properties were auctioned off on Mar 5, 1931 for $335,000 to the Wasatch Gas Co. (subsidiary of Western Public Service Co) and in 1935 were part of the $20 million merger of the Western Public Service Co. with its own subsidiaries that resulted in the creation of the Mountain Fuel Supply Company. Western Public Service Co. started supplying the Salt Lake City-Provo-Ogden CSA with natural gas delivered via pipe line from Wyoming in 1929 and to them the properties formed part of their distribution system. While Western Public Service was granted a 50-year franchise to service Provo in 1929, no connection was established until 1948. Work on a $850,000 10-inch line towards Salt Lake City began in early November 1947. The principal reason for the line was to prevent the acute shortages of previous post-WW2 winters, when coal miner strikes had shut down the Columbia coke oven plant. (Note: Random excerpts from a mountain of press coverage: On January 21, 1946 the McWane pipe plant gas supply was cut off, while Mountain Fuel continued to deliver under a special agreement with the union to keep the ovens running during the ongoing strike.; ...; Supply to Mountain Fuel was curtailed beginning Apr 4, 1946.; Miners returned to work on Apr 22 ending the supply crisis, albeit not for industrial gas consumers.; ...; Several schools closed when Mountain Fuel curtailed gas service on Nov 21, 1946. By Dec 1 essentially nobody was getting gas, coal miners refused to again break their own strike as they had done in the spring, claiming agreements had not been lived up to by the company. The miners returned to work on Dec 9, 1946.; ...; 4 coke ovens were permanently damaged during the April 1946 strike and a fifth was damaged in 1947. The first battery was also nearing its end-of-life.; ...) Regardless of strikes there was a supply shortfall whenever temperatures dropped to 0°F. By end of March connection was made to the existing 6-inch natural gas line ending at Pleasant Grove and the entire line was finished in June 1948. Orem received gas service of any kind for the first time.

The Pacific States Cast Iron Pipe Co., a joint venture of Columbia Steel and the McWane Cast Iron Pipe Co., built a cast iron pipe plant in 1926 (4 building totaling 58,000sqft floor space). Plant capacity was doubled from 40 to 80 tons per day only a few months later in 1927 (3 new 200ft long buildings). On the occasion of the U.S. Steel acquisition in 1930, McWane bought the remaining interest in the plant, which had a capacity of 25,000 tons per year. In 1948 the plant was extended with a $2.5 million centrifugal pipe foundry. Whereas before the sand-casting method had allowed 12-inch x 18-foot pipes to be made, the new foundry allowed 18 foot segments up to 24 inches in diameter. The company still exists today and should be celebrating 100th anniversary in 2026.

== Iron mines ==
All the iron ore that was smelted in the Provo blast furnace came from a number of ore bodies in the vicinity of Iron Mountain in Southwestern Utah, the largest iron mining district in the Western United States, whose history of commercial operation was now beginning. The ore was transported via the Los Angeles and Salt Lake Railroad.

On October 18, 1922 the Los Angeles & Salt Lake RR Co. received regulatory approval from the Interstate Commerce Commission for the construction of a 32-mile branch line from their mainline Lund station to Cedar City, where tourists would be able to visit the Zion National Park. Work on the new line began on April 2, 1923 and it was officially opened on June 27, 1923 by President Warren G. Harding during his Voyage of Understanding and a few weeks before his death.

The history of iron ore prospecting along that route dates back to January 1899, when Frederick Lerch on behalf of eastern iron businesses traveled to Utah to examine the potential of the deposits known to exist only a short distance from the railroad mainline that was then slowly creeping closer towards the Southern California coastline. Other reports date back to 1883. In 1856 a small furnace was built in Cedar City, in 1874, a small furnace was built at Iron City. Both produced iron of excellent quality, but were not economically viable. A railroad branch to Cedar City was already contemplated when the line extension from Milford to Lund was completed in January 1899. In 1903 the idea of a branch was promoted by Colonel Stanley Bark Milner of Salt Lake City and was backed by Utah senator Thomas Kearns and Montana senator William A. Clark. Lerch published an article about his work in the Iron Trade Review in 1904.

At the end of July 1923, 90 workers were busy building the Columbia Steel iron mine, which included a mile long spur to the Cedar City branch and a 700ft railroad tunnel through a ridge, reaching into the ore bed. On Oct 8, 1923 the first shipment of ore was sent to Los Angeles for analysis. During the remainder of 1923 the Union Pacific laid another 4 miles of spur tracks, installed track scales and built a depot in the nearby town of Younger. In December 1923 on average 10 railcars brought 500 tons to the steel mill each day. Youngertown on its first anniversary on March 7, 1924 had a population of 96 men, and 29 women and children. Union Pacific and Columbia Steel were paying $10,910 in monthly wages to the town's inhabitants. The town was named for James Younger (†1926), the former owner of the land. This was the Pioche ore body at the NE foot of Granite Mountain (37.72881°N 113.233°W), mined until July 1926.

In January 1924 the Utah Iron Ore Co. (incorporated Dec 31, 1923 in Salt Lake City with a capital of $100,000), subsidiary of the Milner Corporation (incorporated Mar 17, 1909 in Salt Lake City) issued $250,000 in bonds to finance 3.5 miles of tracks to connect to the Union Pacific Cedar City branch and to develop their Desert Mound (37.70792°N 113.27754°W) open pit mine, which was contracted to ship 72,000 tons per year of iron ore to the United States Smelting, Refining and Mining Company for use as flux. The line was completed July 12, 1924. In September 1925 output of Desert Mound was tripled from 400 to more than 1200 tons per day with the opening of the "upper pit" and the extension of the "lower pit". Mining operations at Desert Mound ceased when the deposits at Iron Mountain were ready for extraction in 1935. In the eight years prior to that (ca. 1927-1935), Desert Mound was satisfying the demand of Columbia's blast furnace.

Columbia Steel began prospecting in 1925 on their properties in the vicinity of Iron Mountain, adjacent to the Blow Out property of Colorado Fuel & Iron. Construction of a 12 mile branch line from Desert Mound to Iron Mountain started on April 1, 1935. The first location that was exploited was the Black Hawk tract.

== Coal mines ==
The Carbon County Railway Company (Note: Incorporated in Utah on July 29, 1922.) on Aug 24, 1922 received approval from the Utah Public Utilities Commission to construct a 4.79 miles branch to Denver & Rio Grande Western Railroad's Sunnyside branch, which had been completed from the Mounds mainline station to the coal mines of the Utah Fuel Company in 1900. The railroad was completed Aug 1, 1923 and on September 10, 1923 the first carload of coal was shipped from the mine, whose infrastructure was however still rudimentary. The coal was sold on the market, pending the completion of the coke ovens at Provo. The tipple was eventually built some 200 feet southeast of the town / mining camp named Columbia (39.5163°N 110.38143°W).

The Utah Coal & Coke Co. (Note: Incorporated: Feb 9, 1912 in Price ($1,000).; Nov 18, 1918 in Carson City ($1,000,000); Dec 27, 1899 in Utah ($25,000)) had acquired 3,120 acres of coal land south of Utah Fuel Co.'s Sunnyside mine from the Marana Land & Development Co. in 1918 for about $1 million, payable in 20 annual installments until 1938. With all the new capital coming in, the obligation was settled in full with a $740,000 payment on January 24, 1923 and title passed to Utah Coal & Coke. The new infrastructure under construction was estimated to cost $1 million, actual contract volume stood at $750,000 in Feb 1923. In September 1919 one of the prospecting tunnels had reached 100 feet deep at Water Canyon in the Book Cliffs mountains.

Leon Felix Rains (Feb 1, 1882 Nashville - Sep 11, 1965 South Temple) joined Utah Coal & Coke in 1919. He was the main promoter of the Columbia Steel Corporation and with options on the coal company and on iron deposits went to San Francisco to pitch his plan to the Columbia Steel Co. management.

Between Nov. 6, 1931 and Mar 31, 1933 (511 days) 278,963 net tons of coal were mined and 310,752 man hours worked (0.9 tons per man-hour). On average 133 miners an 4 supervisors were employed. For that time period the Bureau of Mines observed what they concluded to be an "exceptionally well planned and executed safety program".

In May 1967 USS announced the mine would be closed after depletion had made further mining uneconomical. During its 44-year life span 17 million tons of coal had been produced. Most of the equipment was moved to USS's Somerset mine.

=== Beehive coke ovens ===
External videos
- Sunnyside Coke Ovens

The Defense Plant Corporation invested $9,200,000 into the relocation of the blast furnace from Joliet and into the construction of 500 new beehive coke ovens, both under management of Columbia Steel. The coke ovens were erected by the Bates & Rogers Co. of Chicago between June 20, 1942 and April 1943. (39.53135°N 110.39614°W) The furnace and ovens as a unit were designated Plancor 687 and were not a plant the government was able to sell quickly after the war.

The Kaiser-Frazer Parts Corporation bought the Joliet furnace at Provo and the beehives from the War Assets Administration for $1,150,000 and between February and July 1948 spent about $2,850,000 to repair and improve the furnace and ovens and to build 60 new 2- and 3-bedroom homes at Sunnyside for coke oven workers. A 2.7-mile asphalt paved road was laid from the tipple of the Sunnyside mine to the coke ovens, over which trailer trucks moved the coal. A conveyor belt system was installed at the beehives, whereas before a railroad car had been used for loading the ovens. Several diesel locomotives were acquired to facilitate operation of the beehive ovens.

The first ovens were lit on April 23, 1948. Kaiser expected to produce 750 tons per day from 1100 tons of Sunnyside coal mixed with 90 tons of low-volatile Oklahoma coal. The last ovens were lit and the road was completed about July 1, 1948. Small trucks moved coal until August 5 when they were replaced by the regular roster of two 60-ton trucks. Production ramped up steadily and on Nov 18, 1948 a record 786 tons of coke were produced.

The coke ovens were operated by Kaiser-Frazer from May 1948 to May 1949 and produced 194,000 tons, peak production was 19,774 tons in November 1948. In 1953 K-F was running advertisements in Utah newspapers for the sale of the coke ovens, but not for the blast furnace. Included in the offer were the 60 homes built in 1948 and 550.5 acres 3 miles to the west, which were acquired to secure additional water rights. Deadline for bids was July 31, 1953. The same property, including an extensive list of machinery, was auctioned off on June 17, 1954 in a no-reserve auction at "bargain prices".

== Notes ==
Date	Outstanding	Unissued	Retired
1924	$125,000	$125,000	$0
Feb 2, 1925	175,000	75,000	0
Mar 1, 1927	179,000	0	71,000
1928	147,000	0	103,000
