= Cedar Township, Kansas =

Cedar Township, Kansas may refer to:

- Cedar Township, Chase County, Kansas
- Cedar Township, Cowley County, Kansas
- Cedar Township, Jackson County, Kansas
- Cedar Township, Smith County, Kansas
- Cedar Township, Wilson County, Kansas

== See also ==
- List of Kansas townships
- Cedar Township (disambiguation)
