= Cedar City (disambiguation) =

Cedar City often refers to the community of Cedar City, Utah.

Cedar City may also refer to:

== Communities ==
All located in the United States

- Cedar City, Iowa, a former community, now part of Cedar Falls, Iowa
- Cedar City, Minnesota, a former community, now part of Lyle Township, Mower County, Minnesota
- Cedar City, Missouri, a former community, now part of Jefferson City, Missouri

== Other uses ==
All associated with Cedar City, Utah

- Cedar City Regional Airport
- Cedar City High School
- Cedar City Historic District
- Cedar City Railroad Depot

== See also ==
- Cedar County (disambiguation)
- Cedar Township (disambiguation)
