= Cedar Township =

Cedar Township may refer to:

== Arkansas ==
- Cedar Township, Carroll County, Arkansas
- Cedar Township, Polk County, Arkansas, in Polk County, Arkansas
- Cedar Township, Scott County, Arkansas, in Scott County, Arkansas

== Illinois ==
- Cedar Township, Knox County, Illinois

== Iowa ==
- Cedar Township, Benton County, Iowa
- Cedar Township, Black Hawk County, Iowa
- Cedar Township, Calhoun County, Iowa
- Cedar Township, Cherokee County, Iowa
- Cedar Township, Floyd County, Iowa
- Cedar Township, Greene County, Iowa
- Cedar Township, Jefferson County, Iowa
- Cedar Township, Johnson County, Iowa
- Cedar Township, Lee County, Iowa
- Cedar Township, Lucas County, Iowa
- Cedar Township, Mahaska County, Iowa
- Cedar Township, Mitchell County, Iowa
- Cedar Township, Monroe County, Iowa
- Cedar Township, Muscatine County, Iowa
- Cedar Township, Pocahontas County, Iowa
- Cedar Township, Sac County, Iowa
- Cedar Township, Van Buren County, Iowa
- Cedar Township, Washington County, Iowa

== Kansas ==
- Cedar Township, Chase County, Kansas
- Cedar Township, Cowley County, Kansas
- Cedar Township, Jackson County, Kansas
- Cedar Township, Smith County, Kansas, in Smith County, Kansas
- Cedar Township, Wilson County, Kansas

== Michigan ==
- Cedar Township, Osceola County, Michigan

== Minnesota ==
- Cedar Township, Marshall County, Minnesota
- Cedar Township, Martin County, Minnesota

== Missouri ==
- Cedar Township, Boone County, Missouri
- Cedar Township, Callaway County, Missouri
- Cedar Township, Cedar County, Missouri
- Cedar Township, Dade County, Missouri
- Cedar Township, Pettis County, Missouri

== Nebraska ==
- Cedar Township, Antelope County, Nebraska
- Cedar Township, Buffalo County, Nebraska
- Cedar Township, Nance County, Nebraska

== North Dakota ==
- Cedar Township, Adams County, North Dakota

== South Dakota ==
- Cedar Township, Hand County, South Dakota, in Hand County, South Dakota

== See also ==
- Cedar City (disambiguation)
- Cedar County (disambiguation)
