= Joseph S. Hunter House =

Historic house in Utah, United States

Coordinates: 37.677268°N 113.060317°W

Joseph S. Hunter House is a historic house in Cedar City, Utah, United States. Listed on the National Register of Historic Places in 1982, it was delisted in 2007 after being moved to the Frontier Homestead State Park Museum.

== See also ==
- National Register of Historic Places listings in Iron County, Utah
