= Iron Mountain District =

Coordinates: 37°44′59″N 113°14′05″W

The Iron Mountain District, also known as the Iron Springs District, is a large, high-grade iron deposit in southwestern Utah, near Cedar City. It is currently in care and maintenance status (not actively producing iron ore) by CML Metals Corporation, a division of Palladon Ventures and Luxor Capital. Previous owners include Geneva Steel and U.S. Steel.

The district is made of three primary topographic highs along an approximately 17 mile lineament: Iron Mountain to the southwest, Granite Mountain in the middle, and The Three Peaks in the northwest. Mineralization in this district occurred as rings around the highs as a skarn, a replacement of existing carbonate rock material with high-grade iron ore, mostly in the form of high-grade (>50%Fe in places) magnetite, but also locally hematite. Minor pyrite is also present. Hot fluids are sourced from mid-Tertiary intrusions, which core all three areas.

Magnetite and hematite occur as replacements in the Jurassic limestone around three Laramide orogeny, quartz monzonite porphyry, laccolith intrusions. The iron ore was discovered by a Mormon scouting party in 1849, and furnaces were established in Cedar City in 1852, and then Old Irontown in 1868, to produce pig iron. Total production by 1965 from the district was 72,136,297 long tons of iron ore.

Major areas of iron deposits and their associated mines/pits/ore bodies include:

- Iron Mountain
  - Blowout
  - Blackhawk
  - Comstock
  - Mountain Lion
  - Tip Top
  - Pinto
  - Chesapeake
  - Excellsior
  - Homestake
- Granite Mountain
  - Desert Mound
  - Queen of the West
- Three Peaks
