= Cedar County =

Cedar County may refer to:

- Cedar County, Iowa
- Cedar County, Missouri
- Cedar County, Nebraska
- Cedar County, Choctaw Nation
- Cedar County, Washington, a proposed county made up of part of King County
- Cedar County, Utah Territory, a former county

== See also ==
- Cedar (disambiguation)
- Cedar City (disambiguation)
- Cedar Township (disambiguation)
