= Cedar Breaks National Monument Visitor Center =

- Visitor Center
- U.S. National Register of Historic Places
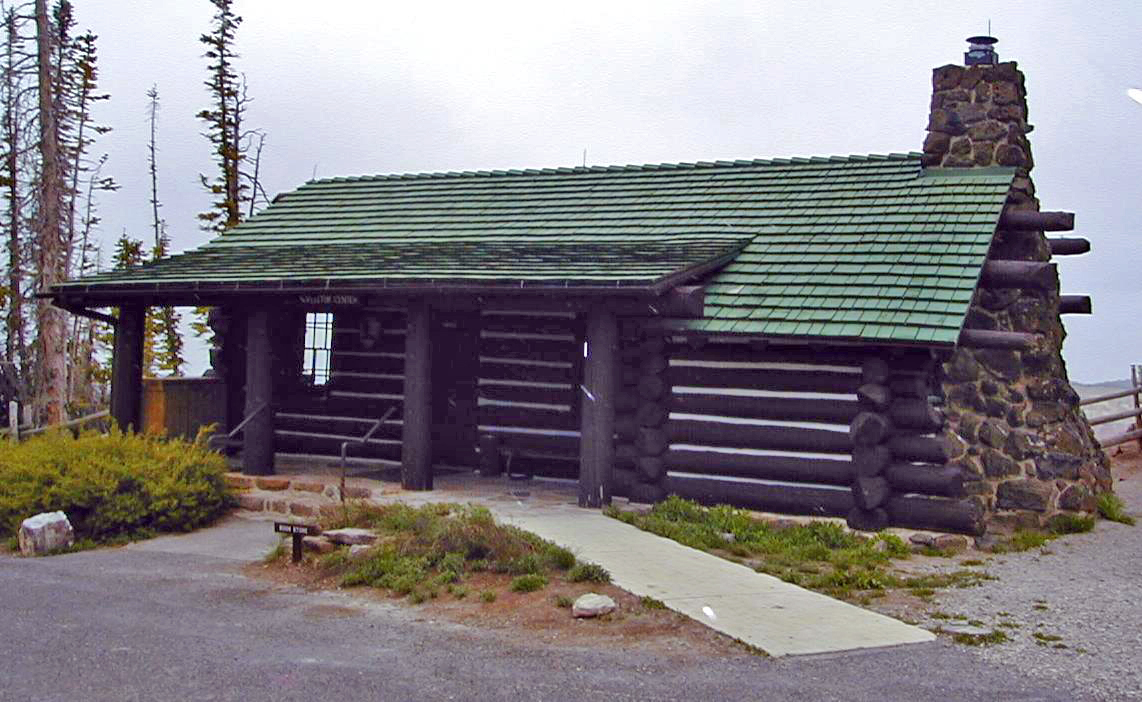

- Location within Utah Location within the United States
- Nearest city: Cedar City, Utah
- Coordinates: 37°37′9″N 112°50′12″W
- Area: less than one acre
- Built: 1937
- Built by: Civilian Conservation Corps
- Architectural style: Rustic log
- NRHP reference No.: 83004386
- Added to NRHP: August 4, 1983

The Visitor Center is a historic log cabin in the Cedar Breaks National Monument in southeastern Iron County, Utah, United States, that is listed on the National Register of Historic Places (NRHP).

== Description ==
The visitor center was built in 1937 by the Civilian Conservation Corps (CCC) in the National Park Service Rustic style. The visitor center is located on the rim of the Cedar Breaks amphitheater, overlooking the stone rock formations. It was constructed of peeled logs with dramatically extended ends, cut to a tapered buttress shape. A large, battered stone chimney at one end echoes the log detailing. The roof is covered by cedar shakes, with extended log purlin ends.

The cabin has two rooms on 606 square feet (65 m^{2}) with an attached porch. The porch is inset into the front facade, covered by an inset shed roof.

The Cedar Breaks Caretaker's Cabin was listed on the NRHP on August 4, 1983. The nearby Cedar Breaks National Monument Caretaker's Cabin was built to a similar design by the same CCC crew from the Zion CCC camp.

== See also ==
- National Register of Historic Places listings in Iron County, Utah
