= Old Irontown, Utah =

- Unincorporated community
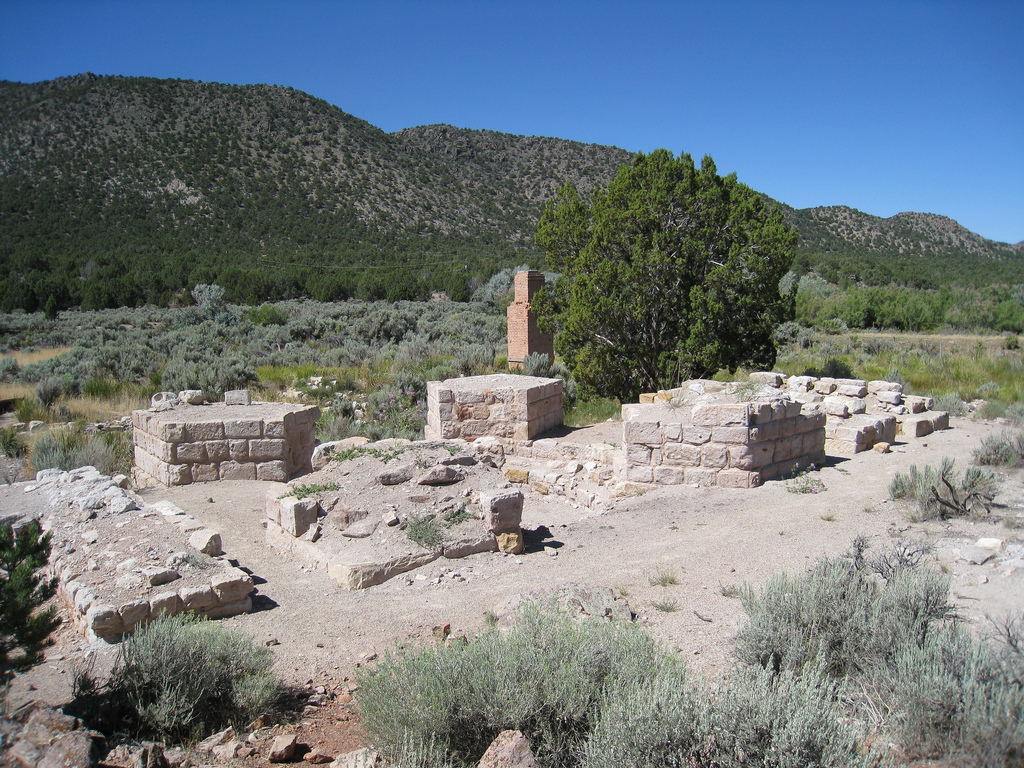
- Ruins at Old Iron Town
- Nickname: Iron City
- Location within Utah Location within the United States
- Coordinates: 37°36′00″N 113°27′01″W
- Country: United States
- State: Utah
- County: Iron
- Founded: 1868
- Abandoned: 1876
- Named for: Iron deposits
- Elevation: 5,846 ft (1,782 m)
- GNIS feature ID: 1444069

Old Irontown, Old Iron Town, or Irontown, originally Iron City, is an unincorporated community and near-ghost town in Iron County, Utah, United States. It is located in Dixie National Forest, approximately 22 miles (35 km) from Cedar City. The settlement was founded in 1868 as a second attempt to mine iron from Iron Mountain after a disappointing yield from Cedar City. The colony lasted until 1876, when strife from the Edmunds–Tucker Act and the Panic of 1873 forced its closure. The site was added to the National Register of Historic Places in 1971.

== History ==
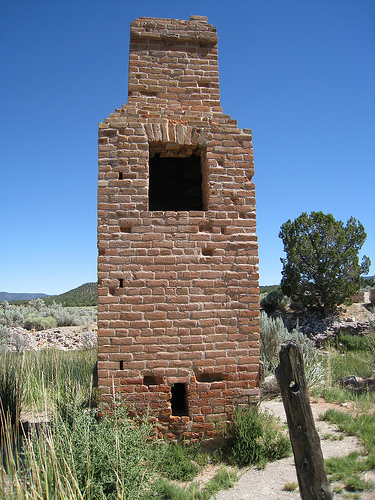
The remains of a blast furnace at Old Iron Town.

Brigham Young left Nauvoo, Illinois to establish Salt Lake City in 1847. Young quickly realized that the fastest way to an independent Mormon state was to make the new colony self-sufficient. One important resource in this regard was iron, which was very expensive to ship from the eastern United States.

The towns of Parowan and Cedar City were founded in 1851 to provide iron for the settlers, which was mined in the Iron Mountain District. Problems plagued the early furnace at Cedar City, and only about 25 short tons (23 t) of pig iron was produced over a three-year period. Iron was nonetheless needed for continued Mormon prosperity, so a second furnace at Old Irontown (Little Pinto) was made in 1868, using iron ore deposits at the southwestern base of Iron Mountain. By 1874, about 400 pounds (180 kg) of pig iron was produced, when operations ceased, and then abandoned 10 years later.

At its peak, the settlement included a schoolhouse, blacksmith, charcoal furnaces, and a foundry. The city was abandoned in 1876. An attempt was made to revive mining from Iron Mountain, but the church was struggling with litigation over the Edmunds–Tucker Act, which banned the plural marriage practiced by some Mormons, and the nationwide economic effects of the Panic of 1873.

Today, the ruins feature a preserved beehive style charcoal oven and a furnace known as an "Arastra", which prepared sands for molds. Parts of the original foundry remain, including the chimney. The site was fenced off by the Sons of Utah Pioneers. It is currently within grounds designated as the Dixie National Forest. The Frontier Homestead State Park Museum in Cedar City provides information about and artifacts from the site. The ruins are found on Iron Town Road, which intersects with Utah State Route 56. The site was added to the National Register of Historic Places on May 14, 1971, as Old Iron Town. There are also a number of newer, occupied homes at the town's location.

The Columbia Steel Company in 1924 was the first to produce pig iron in Utah with enduring success and did so on an industrial scale. Iron ore from the vicinity of Iron Mountain was shipped to the blast furnace at Provo. As part of their start up procedure, on its first day, the blast furnace produced 20 tons of pig iron.

== See also ==
- List of ghost towns in Utah
