= Lake Side Power Station =

Power station in Utah, United States

Coordinates: 40.3311°N 111.75558°W

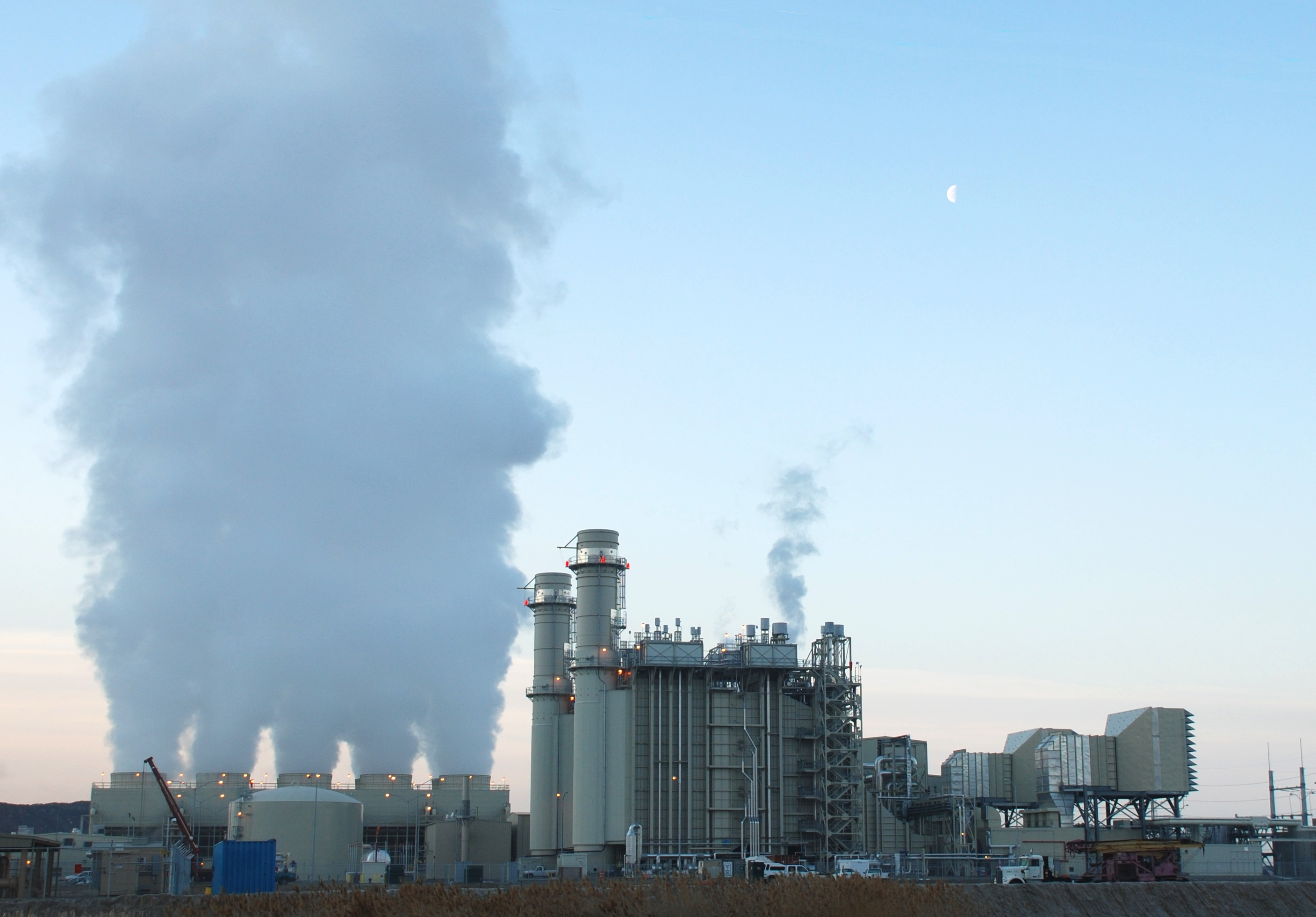
The north side of the plant

Lake Side Power Station is a natural gas turbine combined cycle power plant in Vineyard, Utah, United States. The plant consists of 2 power blocks, each containing a 2x1 combined cycle power plant. It was built by with Siemens Westinghouse Power Corporation and is operated by PacifiCorp which does business in Utah as Rocky Mountain Power.

The station was completed in 2007 with daily average production of 550 megawatts of electricity. In 2014, a second Block went online, bringing the total megawatt production to 1100. Twenty-two of the 70-acre (28 ha) site on which the plant is built were part the site of the Geneva Steel steel mill and meets government pollution regulatory requirements with emission offset credits purchased from Geneva Steel. The plant and its steam plume are usually visible from Interstate 15 between the Orem/Lindon and Pleasant Grove exits near the northeastern corner of Utah Lake.
