= Parowan Meetinghouse =

Historic church in Utah, United States

- U.S. National Register of Historic Places
- Parowan Meetinghouse, September 2005

- Location within Utah Location within the United States
- Location: Center block of Main St., between Center and 100 South St. <Parowan, Utah; United States
- Coordinates: 37°50′28″N 112°49′51″W
- Area: Less than one acre
- Built: 1867
- Architect: Ebenezer Hanks, Edward Dalton and William A. Warren
- NRHP reference No.: 76001818
- Added to NRHP: May 6, 1976

The Parowan Meetinghouse, sometimes referred to as the Parowan Tabernacle or the Parowan Old Rock Church is a historic meetinghouse of the Church of Jesus Christ of Latter-day Saints (LDS Church) in Parowan, Utah, United States, that is listed on the National Register of Historic Places (NRHP).

== Description ==
The building was constructed 1861–1870 and was designed by architect/builders Ebenezer Hanks, Edward Dalton and William A. Warren, all members of the local community. The basement was completed by 1867 when it began to hold meetings. The first meeting held in the relatively large chapel, which seated 800, occurred when LDS Church leader Brigham Young visited in April 1870. The building has two separate staircases with entrances, originally one for males and one for females. The building was abandoned by the church after 1914 when the new adjacent Prairie School styled Parowan 3rd Ward Meetinghouse was built on the same lot.

Somewhere around 1920, ownership was taken over by the city, who turned over the building to the Daughters of the Utah Pioneers who retain caretaker status. The building now serves as the Parowan Old Rock Church Museum that hosts daily tours between Memorial Day and Labor Day.

It was listed on the NRHP May 6, 1976.

== See also ==
- National Register of Historic Places listings in Iron County, Utah
