= Daniel R. and Sophia G. Page House =

- U.S. National Register of Historic Places
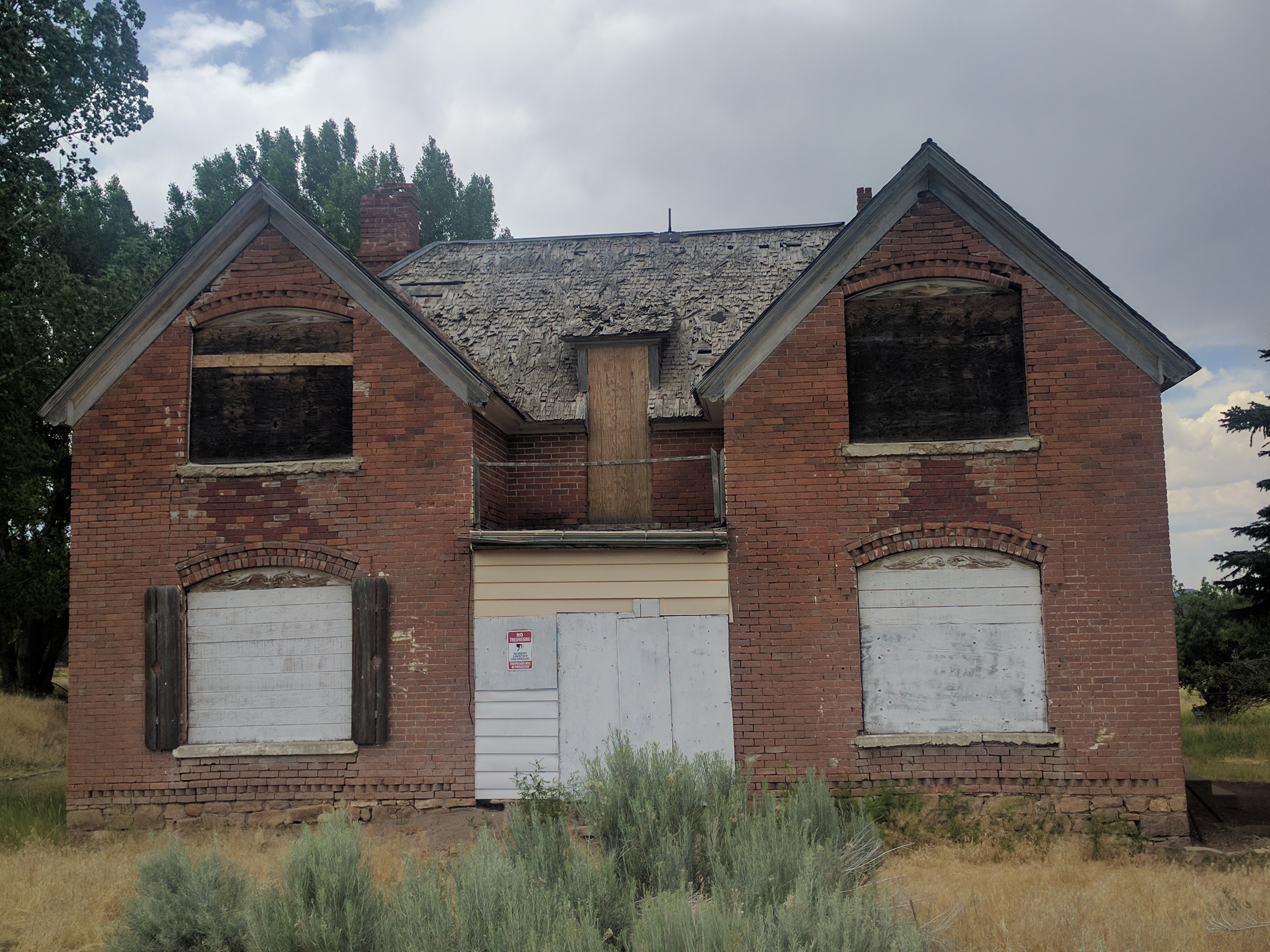

- Location within Utah Location within the United States
- Nearest city: Newcastle, Utah
- Coordinates: 37°34′4″N 113°25′7″W
- Area: 2 acres (0.81 ha)
- Built: 1900
- Built by: Jack & Harvey Faubian
- Architect: Daniel & Sophia Page
- Architectural style: Double cross-wing
- NRHP reference No.: 85000961
- Added to NRHP: May 9, 1985

The Daniel R. and Sophia G. Page House is one of a number of outbuildings on the Page Ranch property in Iron County, Utah. Built in 1900, this two-story house is the primary house on the property and the only building on the property that is currently listed on the National Register of Historic Places. It is located on Pinto Road (Forest Service Road NF-009), east of Pinto, Hamblin, and State Route 18.

== History ==
Page Ranch was owned by the Page family since 1858, having been settled by Daniel Page's grandfather, Robert Richey. The house was designed by then-owners of the Page Ranch property, Daniel Richey Page and Sophia Geary Page. Construction began in 1898 by the builders, Jack and Harvey Fabian, using bricks made on site. The bricks used in construction were made from clay found immediately west of the building's location. The finished house served as a stopping place for travelers and boarded miners who worked nearby. The Richey and Page families owned the ranch until 1934.

== Currently ==
The house remains standing as of 2023, but resides unoccupied, with windows and doors having been boarded up.
