= Iron Mountain (Utah) =

Mountain in the American state of Utah

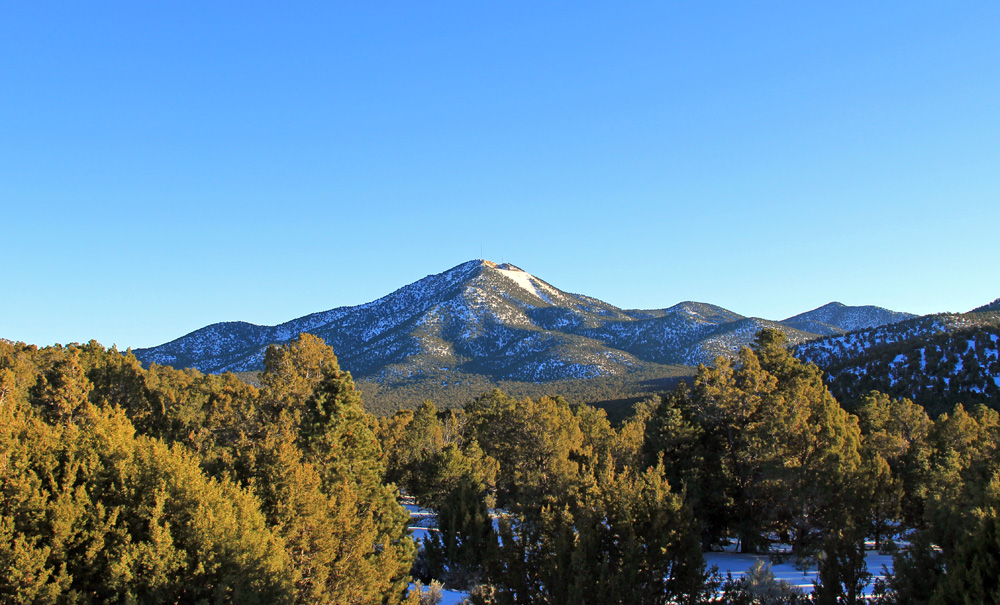
- Iron Mountain viewed from the southwest, January 2013

Highest point
- Elevation: 7,831 ft (2,387 m) NGVD 29
- Prominence: 1,421 ft (433 m)
- Coordinates: 37°38′40″N 113°22′27″W

Geography
- Location within Utah
- Location: Iron County, Utah, U.S.
- Topo map: USGS Desert Mound

Iron Mountain, in southern Iron County, Utah, United States, is the namesake of Iron County. Its summit is at 7,815 feet (2,382 m)

== Description ==
The mountain has a long history of iron mining, in the form of magnetite and hematite. Mining at this site goes back to Brigham Young and Mormon pioneers in the 1850s. The early history of this mining can be seen at Iron Mission State Park in nearby Cedar City, Utah. It is one of three major peaks in the Iron Mountain Mining District.

== See also ==
- List of Mountains in Utah
