= Cedar Township, Cedar County, Missouri =

Inactive township in the US state of Missouri

Coordinates: 37.8417°N 93.8692°W

Cedar Township is an inactive township in Cedar County, in the U.S. state of Missouri.

Cedar Township was established in the 1840s, taking its name from the county in which it is located.
