= Columbia Steel Casting Company =

American steel company

- Formerly: Columbia Engineering Works
- Industry: Metal casting
- Founded: 1901
- Defunct: 2023
- Fate: Acquired by CMS Cepcor
- Successor: Columbia Steel Cast Products
- Headquarters: Portland, Oregon, U.S.

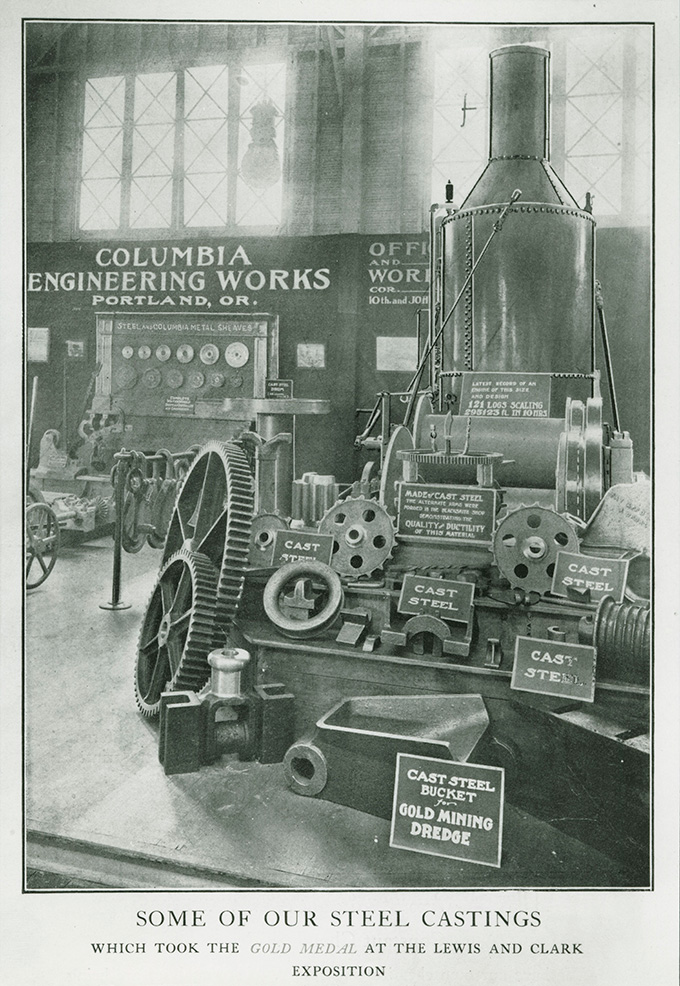
A display by Columbia Engineering Works at the Lewis and Clark Centennial Exposition in 1905

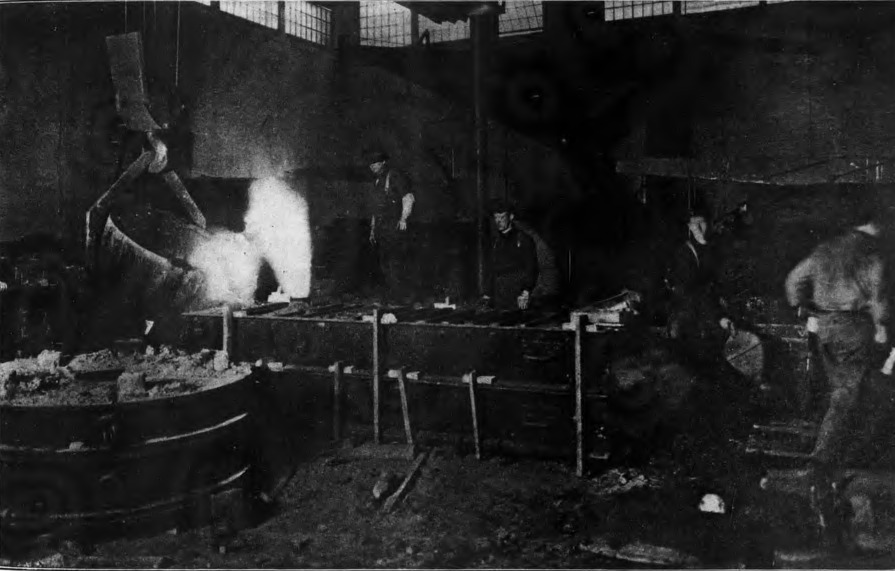
Steel being poured at Columbia Engineering Works c. 1906

The Columbia Steel Casting Company, sometimes shortened to Columbia Steel, was an American steel company headquartered in Portland, Oregon, United States.

== History ==
The company was established in 1901 as Columbia Engineering Works, with Samuel Maxwell Mears as president. It began production of steel in 1903 in their works at the east side of Morrison Bridge and later relocated across the Willamette River to 10th and Johnson.

The company was acquired by W. P. Hammond in 1904. Hammond was involved in gold dredging in California, and the company subsequently began producing dredge parts.

In 1905, Columbia Engineering Works participated in the Lewis and Clark Centennial Exposition.

Alexander M. Clark became the manager of the company in 1911. In 1909 it was decided to expand and built a new plant in Pittsburg, California.

The company was acquired by U.S. Steel in January 1930 but repurchased in 1931 by Clark and other investors in Portland, who renamed it the Columbia Steel Casting Company.

During World War II, the company cast components such as propellers and rudders for Liberty ships built in Portland shipyards.

The company announced that it would be shutting down in 2022. It was acquired by CMS Cepcor Group in 2023 and renamed Columbia Steel Cast Products LLC.
