= Meeks-Green Farmstead =

- U.S. National Register of Historic Places
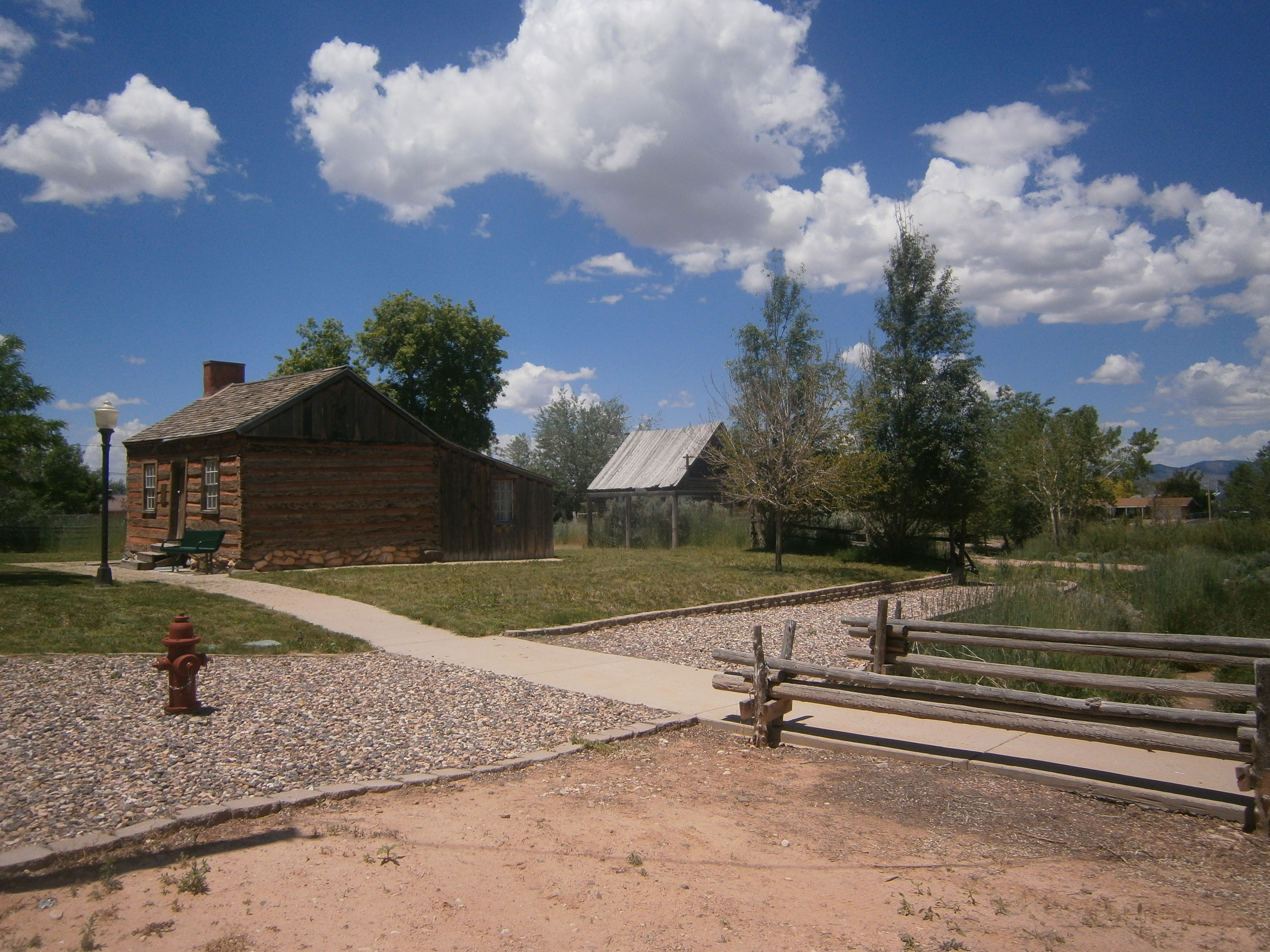

- Location within Utah Location within the United States
- Location: Approximately 40 N. 400 West, Parowan, Utah
- Coordinates: 37°50′34″N 112°50′8″W
- Area: 3.7 acres (1.5 ha)
- Built: 1851
- Built by: Meeks, Priddy; Green, James
- Architectural style: hewn log
- NRHP reference No.: 94000295
- Added to NRHP: April 15, 1994

The Meeks-Green Farmstead in Parowan, Utah was listed on the National Register of Historic Places in 1994. The listing included four contributing buildings and one contributing structure.

Constructed around 1853, the Meeks cabin was constructed after the move of a contingent from Salt Lake City to the newly founded Parowan. Priddy Meeks was one of the town's only two physicians and a member of Parowan's first city council. The Meeks cabin served as both an office and storehouse for the physician until a dispute with the other town's doctor led to Meeks' departure from Parowan in 1861.

The cabin remained in the Meeks family until it was deeded by one of Meeks' children or grandchildren to James Green in June 1904. The farmstead, including the Meeks cabin and other outbuildings, was purchased by the city of Parowan 1990. The focus of the city is to restore and maintain the farm as a preservation of early agricultural life in the area.
