= Geneva Steel =

Steel mill in Utah, United States

Coordinates: 40°19′N 111°45′W

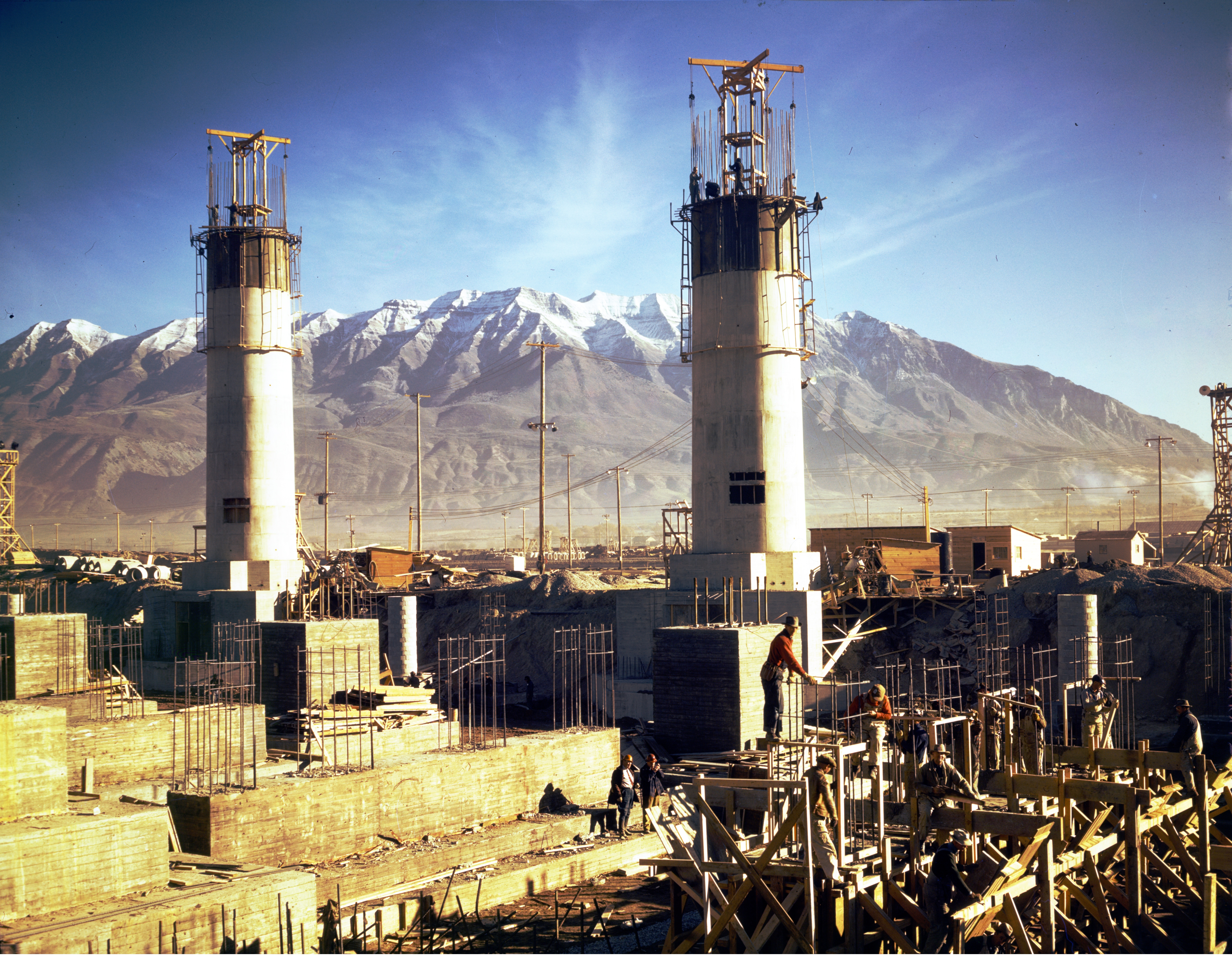
Geneva Steel mill under construction in November 1942. Photograph by Andreas Feininger.

Geneva Steel was a steel mill located in Vineyard, Utah, United States, founded during World War II to enhance national steel output. It operated from December 1944 to November 2001. Its unique name came from a resort that once operated nearby on the shore of Utah Lake.

== Integrated Steel mill ==
The plant was an integrated steel mill. Raw materials were shipped in by rail, processed into steel and steel products, and then reshipped by rail and truck to their final market. The plant, in addition to having all of the facilities for primary steel making, included on-site conversion of coal into coke, plus other facilities for post-processing of coal byproducts, including production of inorganic fertilizers. Blast furnaces converted raw iron ores into pig iron, and final conversion into steel was via open hearth furnaces. Rolling mill facilities for forming steel into plate, and some structural shapes were also located there.

At its peak of operations Geneva Steel was the largest steel mill west of the Mississippi River and produced 60 percent of the steel used in the Western United States.

== Construction ==
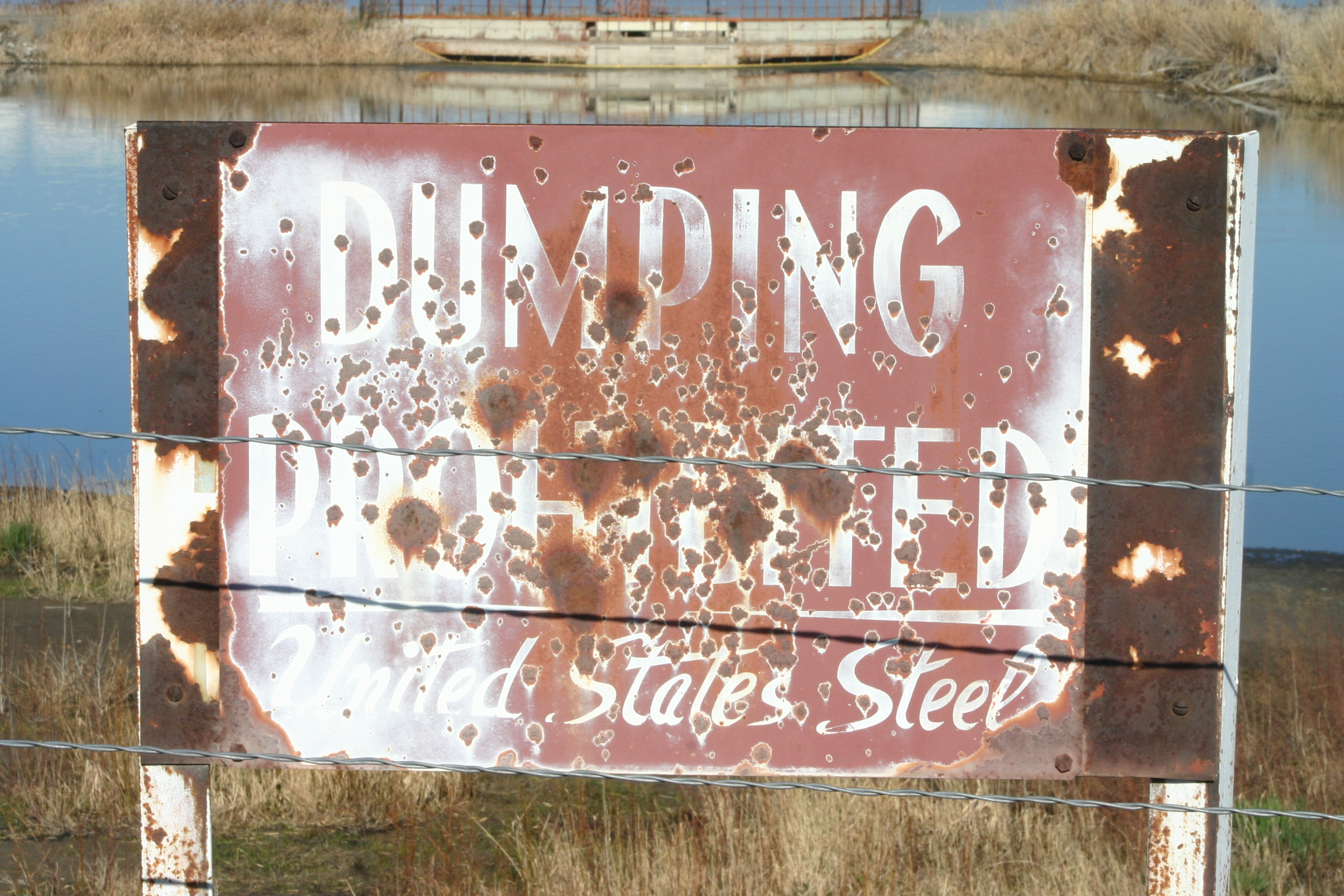
Weathered "no dumping" sign at Geneva Steel

The Geneva Steel mill was constructed with federal funds from November 1941 to December 1944 by Columbia Steel Company (since 1930 a U.S. Steel subsidiary) and United States Steel Corporation (U.S. Steel). Vineyard, Utah, was chosen as the location for the new plant because iron ore, coal, limestone, and other resources necessary for primary steel making are located in nearby areas of Utah, and because Utah Valley is far inland, away from possible Japanese attack on the West Coast.

Geneva Steel operated as a US government facility until June 1946, when it was sold for $47.5 million to U.S. Steel, a vast underbid compared to the mill's estimated $144 million value.

Geneva Steel was built to increase the steel production for America during World War II. President Franklin D. Roosevelt had proposed opening a steel mill in Utah in 1936, but the idea was shelved after a couple of months. After the attack on Pearl Harbor, the United States entered the war and the steel plant was put into development. Geneva shipped its first order in April 1944, comprising over 600 tons of steel plate. The thousands of new jobs created by the plant were hard to fill as many men were overseas fighting; women began working to make up the difference, filling 25 percent of the plant's workforce. To acknowledge Utah's and Geneva Steel's contribution during the war, several Liberty Ships were named in honor of Utah including the USS Joseph Smith, USS Brigham Young, USS Provo, and the USS Peter Skene Ogden.

== Operations ==
After the purchase by U.S. Steel, the Geneva plant was started up again. By August 1946, 2 of 3 blast furnaces, 2 of 4 coke oven batteries, 3 of 9 open hearth furnaces, the slabbing mill and the plate mill were in operation, but not the structural mill. Employment at the mill, the Horse Canyon coal mine and the limestone and dolomite quarry at Payson rose to slightly more than 2000.

The Consolidated Steel Corporation of Los Angeles bought approximately 60,000 tons of 31 feet by 92 inches plates for a 214 mile section of the 30-inch Texas-California pipe line in 1946-1947 and 92 and 95-inch plates of the same length for the 980 miles of 30 and 31-inch pipes for the Trans-Arabian Pipeline in 1947-? and then 167,918 tons of plates for the Kirkuk–Baniyas pipeline in 1950 and 1951 from the Geneva Mill. Even though a U.S. Steel subsidiary after August 1948, Consolidated bought its plate for the Transcontinental Pipeline project from the Kaiser Fontana mill in 1949-1950 and also built a new blast furnace for the Fontana plant around the same time.

== Economic importance and continuing viability ==
During its operation Geneva Steel was important to Utah County's economy, providing thousands of jobs and attracting many ancillary businesses to the area. As time went on, however, the plant's fortunes declined due to multiple factors increasing labor costs and pension woes, foreign imports, Utah's relative isolation from the rest of the United States and the general decline of manufacturing industries in the United States.

On at least one occasion, Geneva Steel paid its workers in uncommon $2 bills intending to flood the local community with evidence of the plant's importance to the economy.

Early in 1987 the mill shut down temporarily, but reopened later after the mill was spun off from US Steel and purchased by local business interests. In the late 1980s and early 1990s, students from Brigham Young University (BYU) protested the pollution, particularly the particulate matters, emitted from the steel operation. They carried signs at the entrance of BYU football games that included slogans like, "Pollution makes God barf."

The Cannon Brothers (Christopher and Joseph) bought the plant with the help of Utah Senator Orrin Hatch. They tried to keep it open for as long as possible. However, in March 1999 the company filed bankruptcy and reorganized with a $110 million loan via the Emergency Steel Loan Guarantee Act of 1999, but the reorganization attempt failed. Geneva Steel filed bankruptcy again and shut down permanently in November 2002.

There is some controversy regarding their alleged pollution of Utah Lake. Contaminated groundwater under a former Utah steel mill may be moving toward Utah Lake according to a recent report conducted by a Salt Lake City engineering company. The Utah Department of Environmental Quality is investigating the CH2M Hill study of the Geneva Steel site to determine if contaminated groundwater is moving beyond the facility boundary. The facility site and environmental contaminants are being remediated under EPA's voluntary Brownfields cleanup program.

U.S. Steel operated the site in the early 1940s, producing millions of tons of steel for the war effort. After the war, U.S. Steel ran the company until 1987 when it sold the plant to Geneva Steel Company. During its years of operation, the facility produced wastes contaminated with human carcinogens and hazardous substances including arsenic, lead, zinc, nickel, acids, PCBs and petroleum products. Arsenic, ammonia, and benzene recently showed up in a number of groundwater monitoring wells around the perimeter of the plant. The Utah Department of Environmental Quality is still unsure, however, if toxic chemicals are definitely moving toward Utah Lake.

== Liquidation deals ==
Liquidation of Geneva Steel's substantial assets may have broad effects on Utah County's future development.

Geneva Steel's 1,750 acres (7 km^{2}) of land were sold in November 2005 for $46.8 million to Anderson Geneva, a sister company to Anderson Development, which plans to reuse the land for a wide range of purposes, including the FrontRunner commuter rail corridor. The land must undergo environmental cleanups before any development can occur, with most of the cost paid for by U.S. Steel. The mill equipment will not remain because it has been sold for $40 million to the Chinese firm Qingdao Iron & Steel Group.

Most of Geneva Steel's water rights were sold to the Central Utah Water Conservancy District in May 2005 for $88.5 million, with some additional water rights sold for $14 million to the private firm Summit Vineyard, LLC, which has used them to support their Lake Side power plant. Its iron ore properties were sold for $10 million to Palladon Ventures Ltd, which hopes to build a new steel mill with modern technology closer to the iron ore mines.

Geneva Steel's 7,000 tons of emission reduction credits are also for sale. In January 2006, local citizens announced they were forming a group to attempt to purchase and retire those credits in order to maintain local air quality. The exact price of the credits will be determined by the open market, but estimates of the value of the emissions reduction credits range from $350,000 to $35,000,000.

== In popular culture ==
The movie Footloose (1984) was set in a fictional town in Utah, and was filmed entirely in Utah County, Utah, part of the Provo metropolitan area. The Geneva steel mill was the setting for a dance montage by the lead character, Ren McCormack.

== The site today ==
Early in 2007, the site made headlines in the Utah press, as owner Anderson Geneva made an offer to Real Salt Lake. The deal included moving their stadium to the Geneva site and they (Anderson Geneva) would offer up the land for free. The offer was subsequently turned down.

In 2014, Utah Valley University purchased 125 acres of the Geneva Steel site in order to expand to a new West Campus.

== See also ==
- C. Arden Pope

== External sources ==
- E. Dixon Larson collection on Geneva Steel, MSS 1865, L. Tom Perry Special Collections, Harold B. Lee Library, Brigham Young University
- Flyover of old steel mill facilities in second half of video.
