= Cedar City station =

Defunct train station in Cedar City, Utah, US

Coordinates: 37.6818°N 113.0623°W

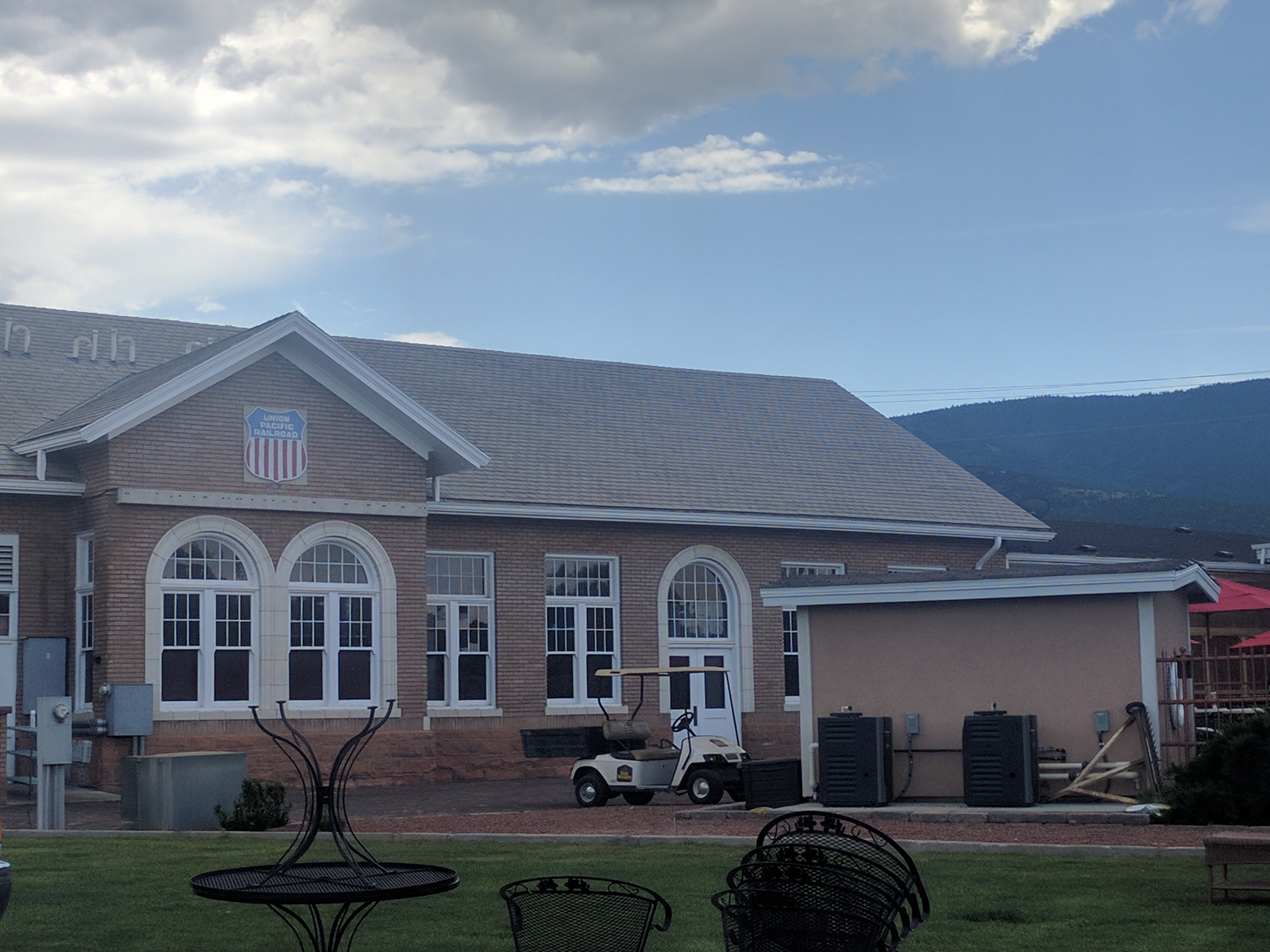
Rear view of Cedar City Railroad Depot, July 2017

The Cedar City Railroad Depot was a train station in Cedar City in the U.S. state of Utah. Built in 1923, the station directly contributed to the growth of the iron ore and livestock industries in the area. The depot was constructed by the Union Pacific Railroad. The Union Pacific also helped to purchase hotels and buses and to construct lodges for the area, leading to a growth in the tourism industry in southern Utah. Over time, automobile traffic replaced the heavy reliance upon railroad travel, and the depot was closed in 1959. The depot now remains as the only building that documents the growth of tourism and the reliance upon railroad in Cedar City from the first half of the twentieth century. It was listed on the National Register of Historic Places in 1984.

As of 2017, the depot houses storefronts for a couple of local businesses.
