= Cedar Township, Wilson County, Kansas =

Township in Wilson County, Kansas, U.S.

Coordinates: 37.5161°N 95.6831°W

Cedar Township is a township in Wilson County, Kansas, United States.

== History ==
Cedar Township was founded in 1867.
