= Cedar City Historic District =

Historic district in Utah, United States

- U.S. National Register of Historic Places
- U.S. Historic district
- Location within Utah Location within the United States
- Location: Roughly bounded by 100 West and 300 West, College Ave., and 400 South; Cedar City, Iron County, Utah, U.S.
- Coordinates: 37°40′23″N 113°3′41″W
- Architectural style: Tudor Revival, Bungalow, American Craftsman, Victorian, Prairie School, Renaissance Revival, Colonial Revival, International Style
- NRHP reference No.: 04000677
- Added to NRHP: July 7, 2004

The Cedar City Historic District is a set of one hundred and seventy-two buildings in Cedar City, Utah. Of these, one hundred and four contribute to its historical integrity. Cedar City was originally an iron works near the Latter-day Saint city of Parowan. After Brigham Young shut down the iron facilities, two-thirds of Cedar City's residents left for other settlements. The remaining families prospered from sheep ranching. The Union Pacific Railroad connected to the town in the early 1900s and provided a tourism boom for the city. The district represents some of the oldest houses for Cedar City residents, most of which were farmers or ranchers. Later houses in the district represent early 20th century revivals.

== History ==
After Brigham Young established Salt Lake City in northern Utah Territory, he sent out groups of Mormon families to colonize new lands. Young envisioned a self-sufficient Latter-day Saint state, and one important resource required by the Latter-day Saints was iron. Young sent one hundred and sixty-one people led by Danish settler Jens Nielson to start the city of Parowan in 1851 to reap the nearby iron deposits. The iron was found in modern-day Cedar City, and thirty-five men constructed an iron works there in November 1851. Young chartered Cedar City a few months later. The iron mined from Cedar City was the first west of the Mississippi River. Following a series of mishaps, including the Mountain Meadows massacre, Young ordered the iron works to shut down in 1858. Most Cedar City citizens left for other cities, but three hundred and one people stayed behind.

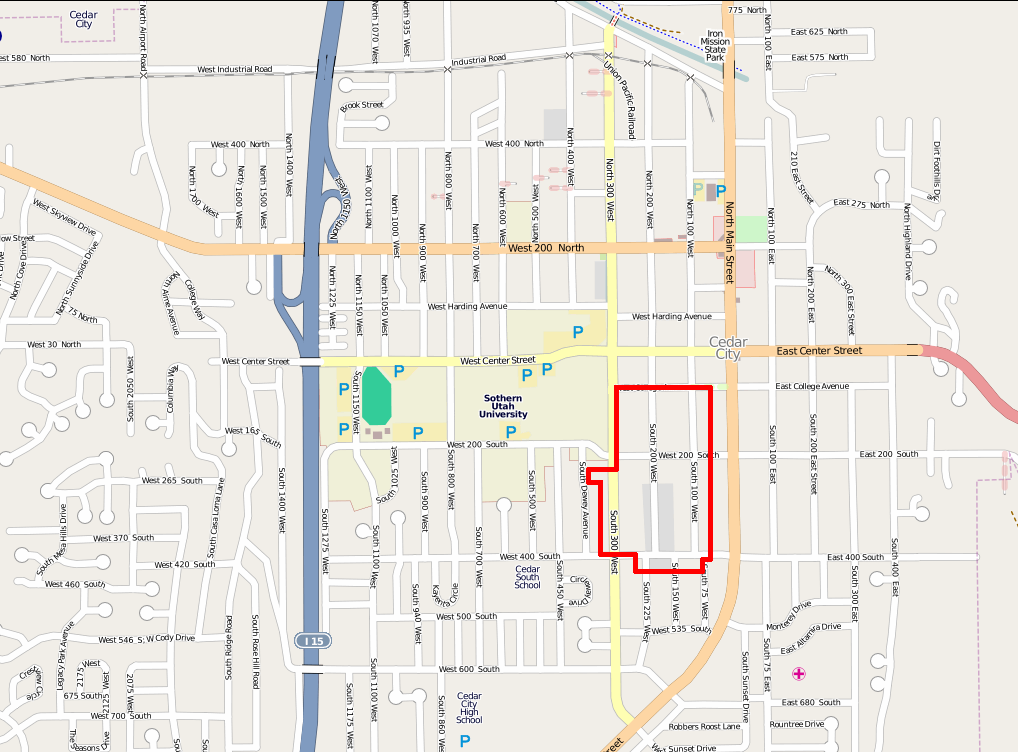
Location of the Cedar City Historic District within Cedar City

Cedar City spent the next few decades as an agrarian town. Sheep ranching became a lucrative business for the settlers, enabling several to build two-story, brick Victorian houses. By 1880, the population had grown to 740, creating a demand for public and religious buildings. Branch Agricultural College was founded in 1897, and by 1904, the city had electricity and plumbing. The town raised $100,000 to purchase a right-of-way for the Union Pacific Railroad in 1899. Following a railroad connection, Cedar City focused on drawing tourists. Its proximity to Cedar Breaks National Monument, Zion National Park, Grand Canyon National Park, and Bryce Canyon National Park was advertised by Union Pacific. Tourists would arrive in Cedar City and then take buses to the parks. Cedar City's population doubled in the 1920s. Though most residents of the historic district were still agricultural, the new residents brought Colonial, Tudor, and Renaissance Revival buildings to the district. Though the city struggled through The Great Depression, new iron mines opened after World War II prompted further economic growth.

Eleven percent of the contributing structures were built before the 1920s. Ninety-eight percent of contributing buildings are residential. The district was added to the National Register of Historic Places on July 7, 2004.
