= Frontier Homestead State Park Museum =

State park and museum in the United States

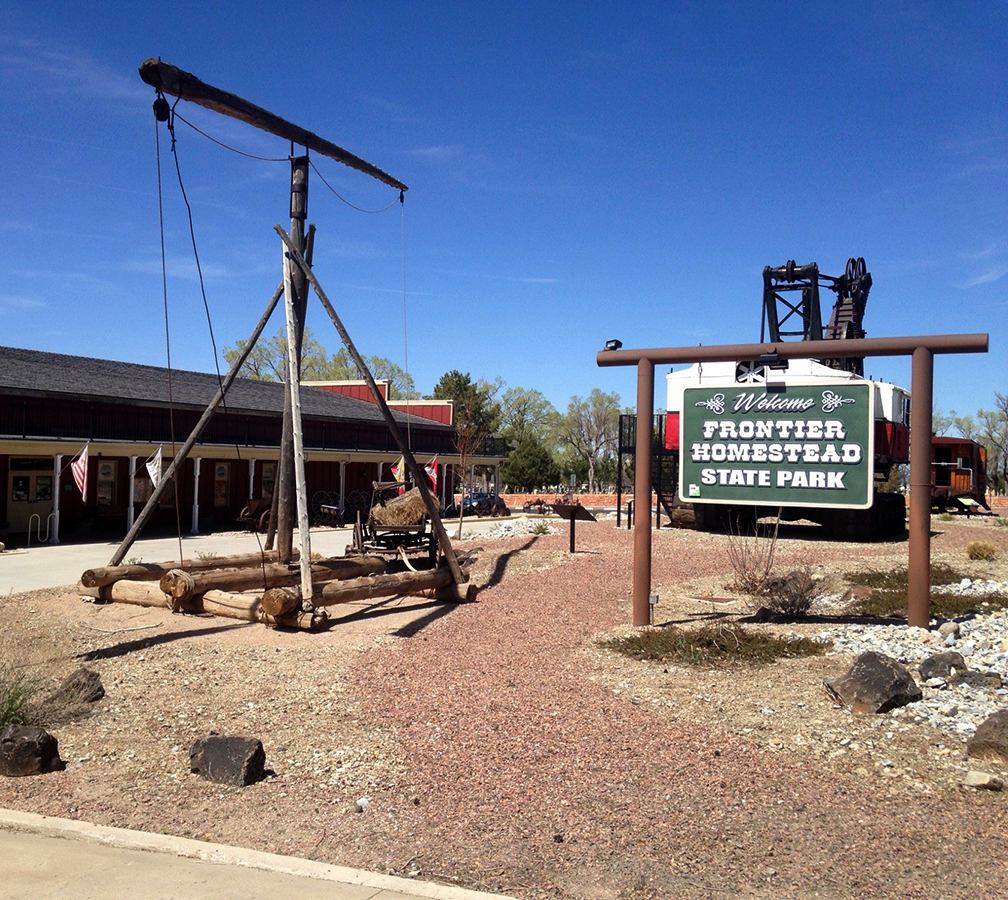

- Location within Utah Location within the United States
- Interactive map of Frontier Homestead; State Park Museum
- Location: Cedar City, Utah, United States
- Coordinates: 37°41′18″N 113°3′42″W
- Area: 11 acres (4.5 ha)
- Elevation: 5,800 ft (1,800 m)
- Opened: 1973
- Operator: Utah State Parks
- Visitors: 12,569 (in 2025)
- Website: Official website
- Utah State Parks

Frontier Homestead State Park Museum is a state park and museum of in Cedar City, Utah, United States.

== Description ==
The museum was opened to the public in 1980, originally named Iron Mission State Park for the pioneering attempts of Mormon settlers to create an iron industry. The museum name was changed in 2009, as the park grew and expanded around Gronway Parry's collection of horse-drawn vehicles and agricultural implements. Over the years other programs and activities have been added such as pioneer craft demonstrations, rotating art exhibits, interpretive lectures, guided curation tours, and a Junior Curator program.

Museum displays include horse-drawn vehicles used from 1850 to 1920 and a collection of pioneer artifacts. An iron industry exhibit features the only known remaining artifact from the original foundry - the town bell. Other items of interest include several historic cabins, a large collection of horse-drawn farm equipment, and a replicated pioneer household.

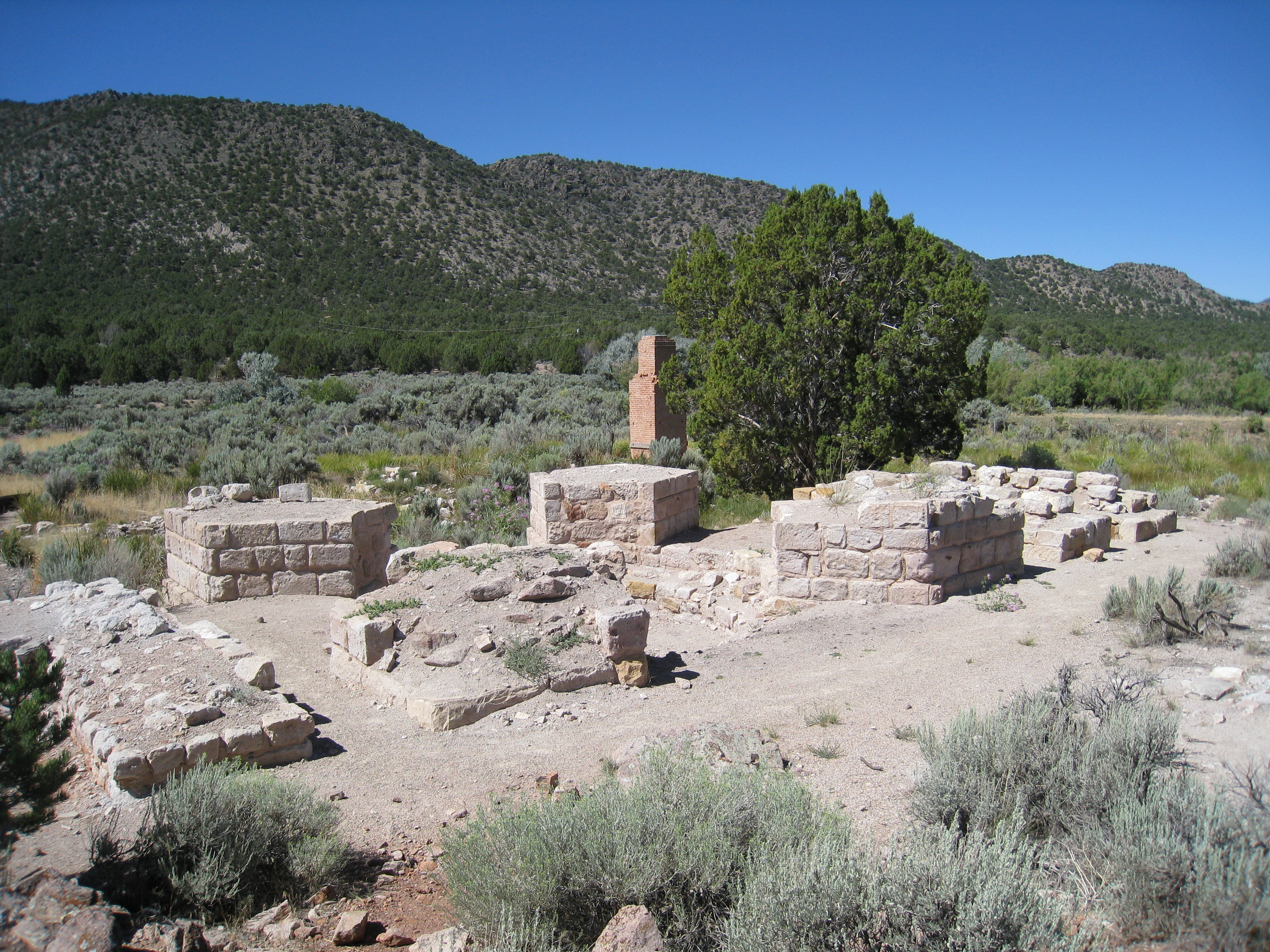
Ruins at Old Iron Town, August 2008

Frontier Homestead also manages the historic ruins of Old Iron Town, an iron foundry west of Cedar City that operated in the mid 19th century.

== History ==
Lack of iron was a major concern to pioneers who began settling in Utah in 1847. When iron deposits were discovered in southern Utah, The Church of Jesus Christ of Latter Day Saints leader Brigham Young called for volunteers to colonize the area. A site near Coal Creek, now Cedar City, was selected in November 1851 for the iron works. Ten months later, the colony completed construction of a small blast furnace and began to operate the iron foundry. Despite its initial success, the 'Iron Mission' faced many difficulties. Financial troubles, floods, heavy freezes and furnace failure took their toll. In addition, a crop shortage threatened starvation. The people persevered in the face of these obstacles, but the foundry was eventually closed in 1858.

== See also ==
- List of Utah State Parks
