= Newfoundland Mountains =

Mountain range in Utah, United States

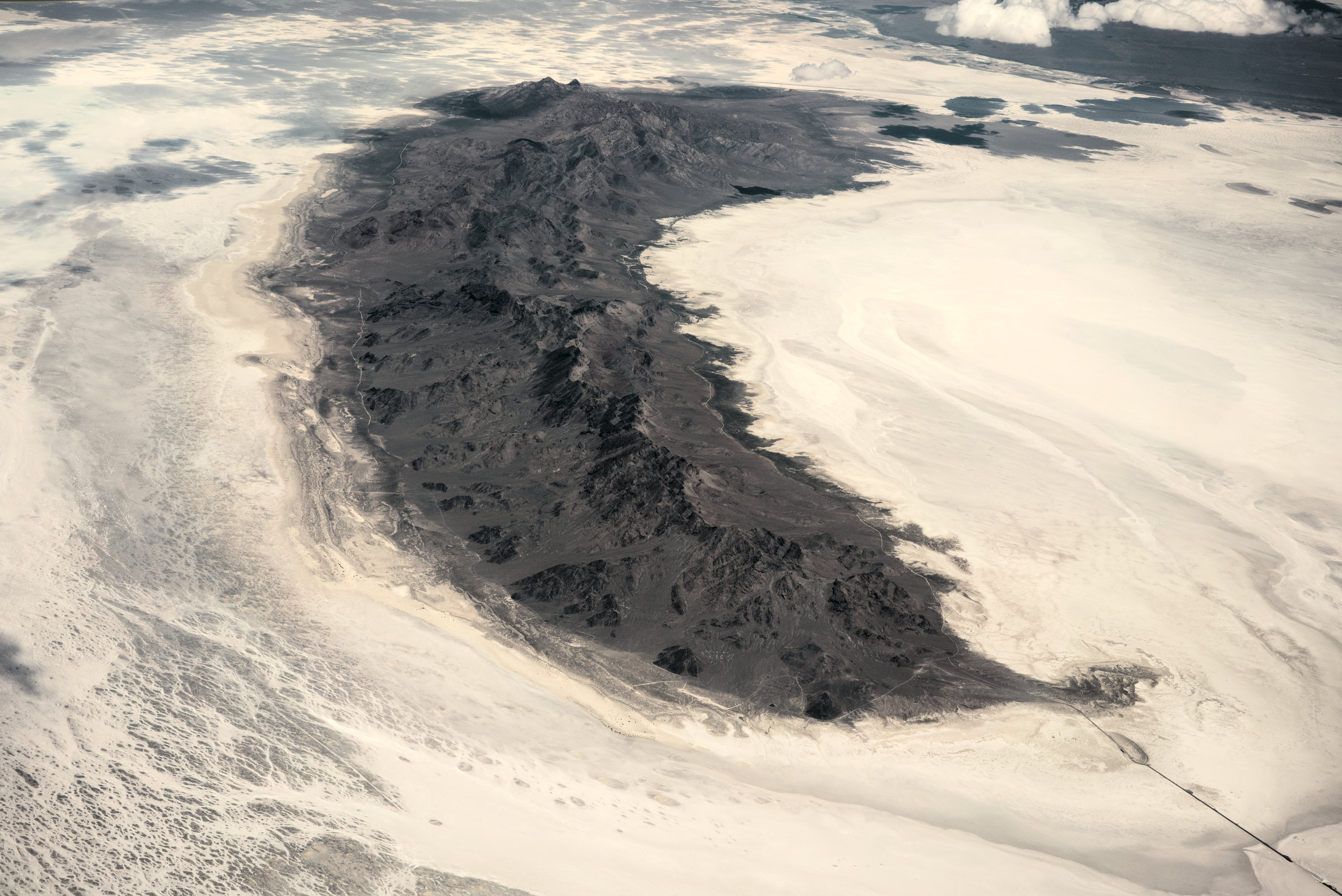
- Aerial view from the south

Highest point
- Peak: Desert Peak, (central-north)-Newfoundland Mountains
- Elevation: 7,005 ft (2,135 m)
- Coordinates: 41°11′10″N 113°22′04″W

Dimensions
- Length: 20 mi (32 km) N-S
- Width: 3 mi (4.8 km) (5-mi wide, NE section, (Desert Peak at south))

Geography
- Location within Utah
- Country: United States
- State: Utah
- Regions: Great Basin Desert and Great Salt Lake Desert
- County: Box Elder
- Communities: Lakeside, Hogup and Lucin
- Range coordinates: 41°11′10″N 113°22′04″W
- Borders on: Hogup Mountains, Dugway Range, Silver Island Range, Pilot Range and Grouse Creek Mountains

The Newfoundland Mountains are a 20-mile (32 km) long mountain range located in southern Box Elder County, Utah, United States. The range is the only 'island' mountain range encircled by the Great Salt Lake Desert salt flat. Other ranges protrude into the desert salt flat, the Silver Island and Dugway Ranges being the premiere examples. Other individual mountains also arise as 'island' peaks, or mountains in the salt flat desert itself, most notably Granite Mountain in the south desert, and Wildcat Mountain to its north. Granite Mountain lies at the north of the Dugway Range.

== Description ==
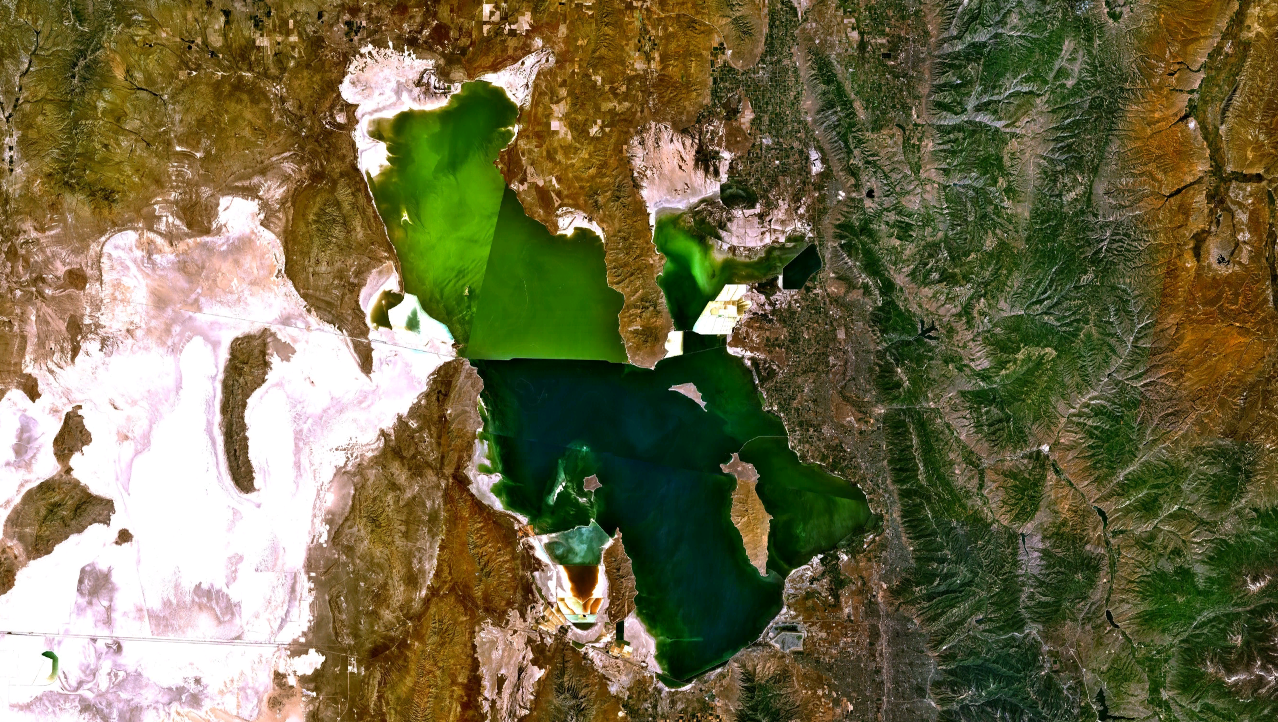
World Wind satellite photo of the Newfoundland Mountains (middle left) and surrounding entities — Great Salt Lake Desert, Great Salt Lake, and landforms

The Newfoundland Mountains are crescent-shaped, mostly only 3 miles (4.8 km) wide, and its closest neighboring landform across the salt flats, is 6 miles (9.7 km) northeast from the northeast range terminus, the Hogup Mountains. The northeast end of the range is a wider section, with the range's highest peak southerly (at the north section). The range is made of one ridgeline, and gets progressively lower in elevation, especially at the very south. The highpoint of the range is Desert Peak, 7,005 feet (2,135 m). The southern tip of the range lies on the north perimeter of the Utah Test and Training Range. Only one major peak is named in the range, Desert Peak (not to be confused with Deseret Peak or the Desert Peak Formation).

Other ranges located on the perimeter of the Great Salt Lake Desert are: Pilot Range, Silver Island Range, Deep Creek Range, Fish Springs Range, Dugway Range, Cedar Mountains, Grassy Mountains, Lakeside Mountains, Hogup Mountains, and Grouse Creek Mountains; some other, much shorter series of hills/'mountains' exist on the desert's perimeter, and include a group on an alluvial fan region south of the Grouse Creek Mountains, the closest to the Newfoundland range.

== Access ==
The closest access to the range is to the north from the Hogup Mountains. The Union Pacific rail route across the central-north of the Great Salt Lake Desert lies about 2 miles (3.2 km) north of the range; an unimproved road parallels the route. From the east, at Lakeside, and Hogup, 10 miles (16 km) east of the range, and at the south of the Hogup Mountains, the north of the range can be accessed.

From the west from Lucin, the unimproved route along the Union Pacific Railroad rail is 32-mile (51 km) long.

An unimproved road encircles the Newfoundland Mountains foothills at the salt flat. The route is 40+ miles long. (The southern 2.5 miles (4.0 km) stretch of the range lies in the Utah Test and Training Range.)
