= Tetzlaff Peak =

Mountain in Tooele County, Utah, United States

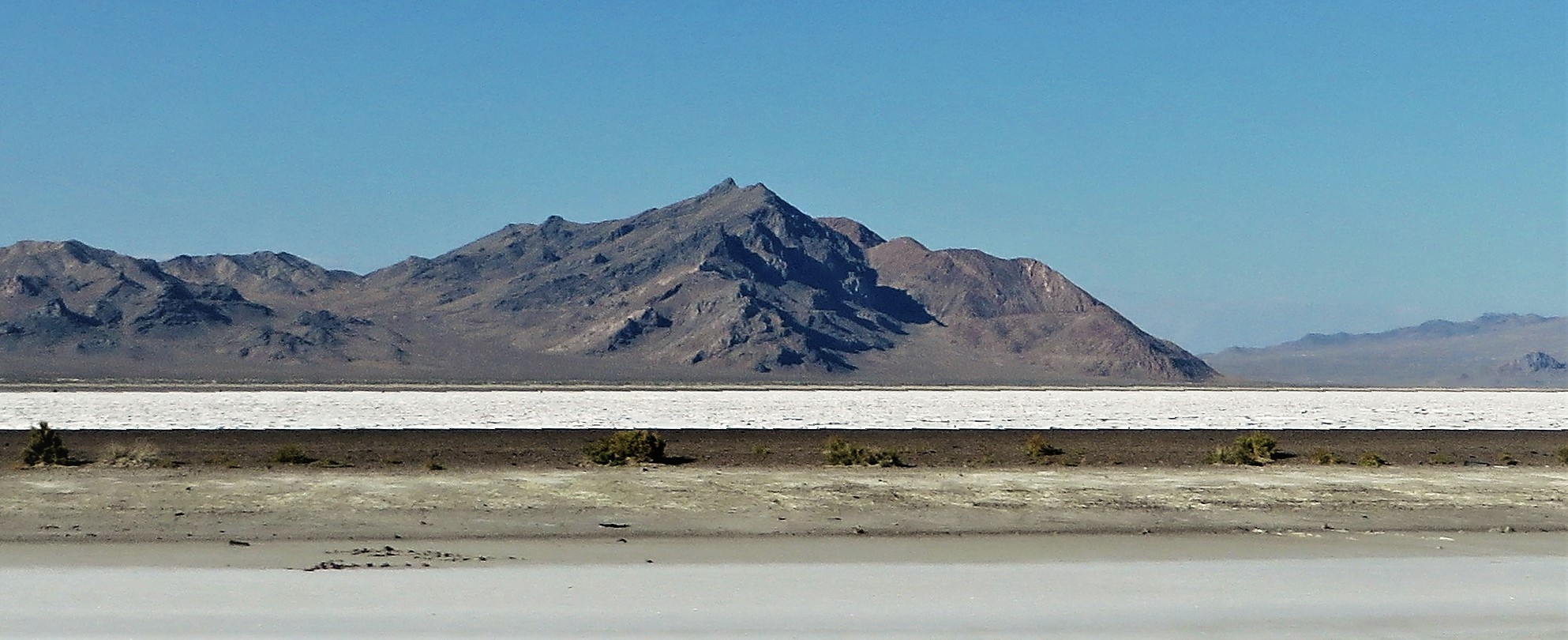
- South aspect, from Interstate 80

Highest point
- Elevation: 6,267 ft (1,910 m)
- Prominence: 1,387 ft (423 m)
- Parent peak: Lamus Peak (6,284 ft)
- Isolation: 5.38 mi (8.66 km)
- Coordinates: 40°50′02″N 113°54′33″W

Naming
- Etymology: Teddy Tetzlaff

Geography
- Location within Utah Location within the United States
- Location: Great Salt Lake Desert
- Country: United States of America
- State: Utah
- County: Tooele
- Parent range: Silver Island Mountains; Great Basin Ranges
- Topo map: USGS Tetzlaff Peak

Geology
- Rock age: Cambrian
- Rock type: Limestone

Climbing
- Easiest route: class 2 hiking

Tetzlaff Peak is a 6,267-foot elevation (1,910 m) mountain summit in Tooele County, Utah, United States.

== Description ==
Tetzlaff Peak is situated in the Silver Island Mountains which are a subset of the Great Basin Ranges, and it is set on land managed by the Bureau of Land Management. The community of Wendover, Utah, is 10 miles to the southwest and the Bonneville Speedway is five miles to the southeast. Topographic relief is significant as the summit rises 2,000 feet (610 meters) above the Bonneville Salt Flats in one mile. This landform's toponym was officially adopted in 1960 by the U.S. Board on Geographic Names to honor American racecar driver Teddy Tetzlaff (1883–1929). On August 12, 1914, Tetzlaff set a land speed record by driving the Blitzen Benz 142.8 miles per hour (229.8 kilometres per hour) at the Bonneville Salt Flats (then known as Salduro, Utah).

== Climate ==
Tetzlaff Peak is set in the Great Salt Lake Desert which has hot summers and cold winters. The desert is an example of a cold desert climate as the desert's elevation makes temperatures cooler than lower elevation deserts. Due to the high elevation and aridity, temperatures drop sharply after sunset. Summer nights are comfortably cool. Winter highs are generally above freezing, and winter nights are bitterly cold, with temperatures often dropping well below freezing.

== Gallery ==
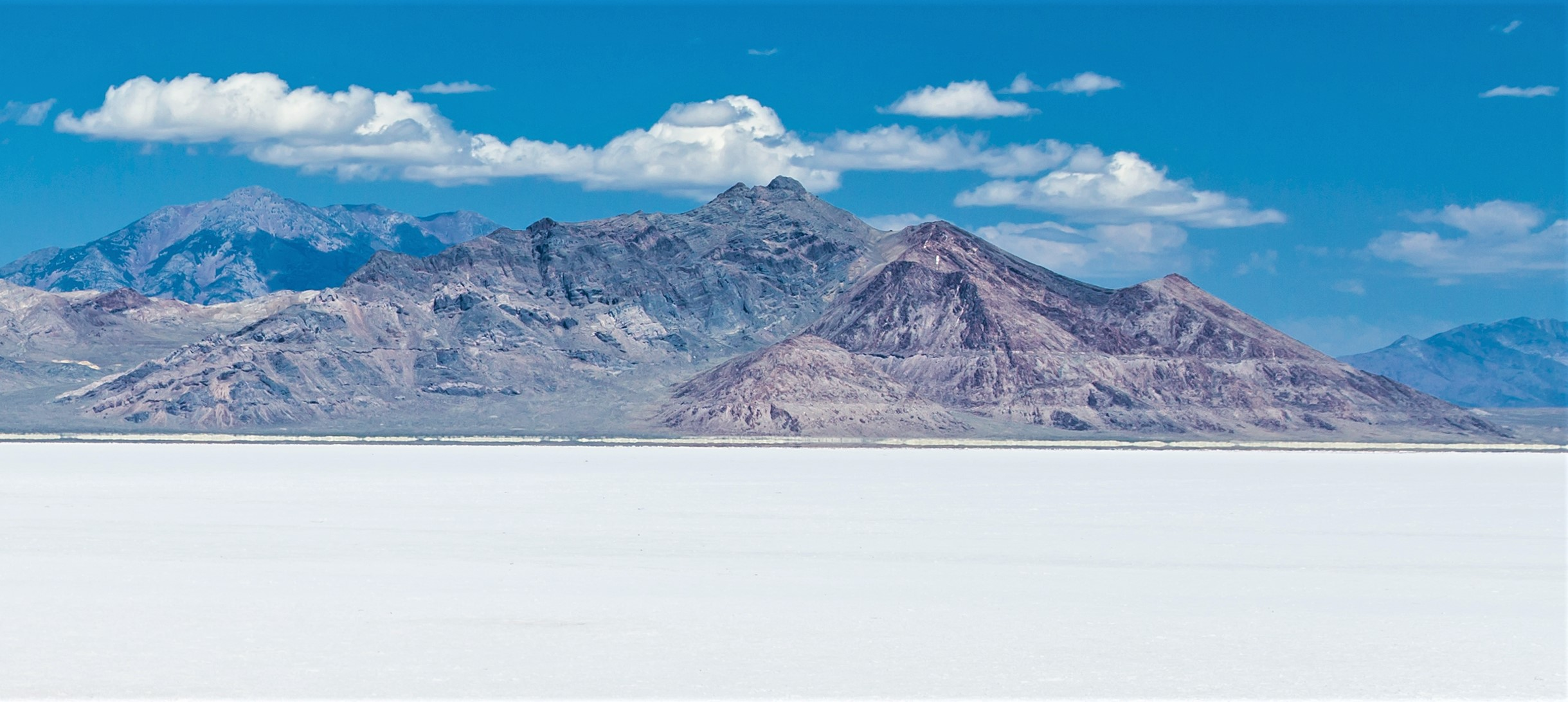
Tetzlaff Peak (center), Pilot Peak (distant left) from Bonneville Salt Flats

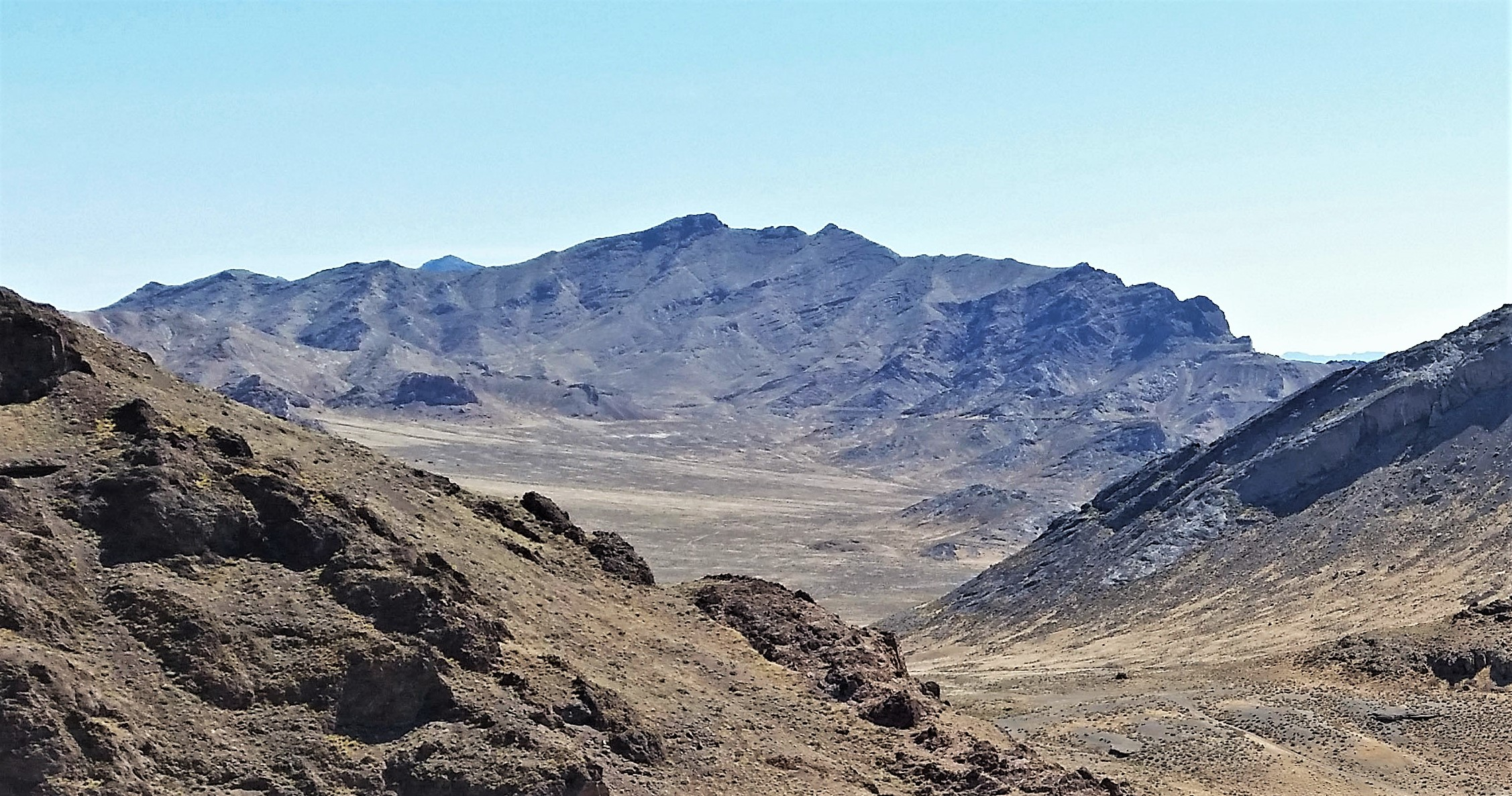
Southwest aspect

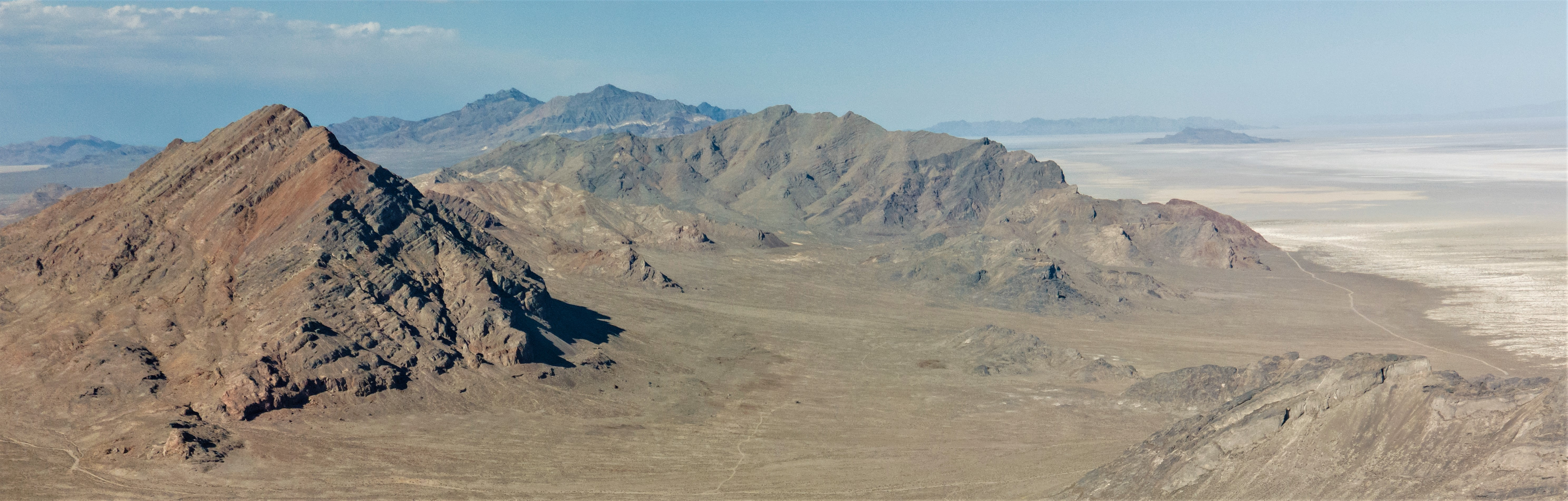
Rishel Peak (left) and Tetzlaff Peak (center) seen from Volcano Peak.
Further in the distance are Graham Peak and Jenkins Peak.

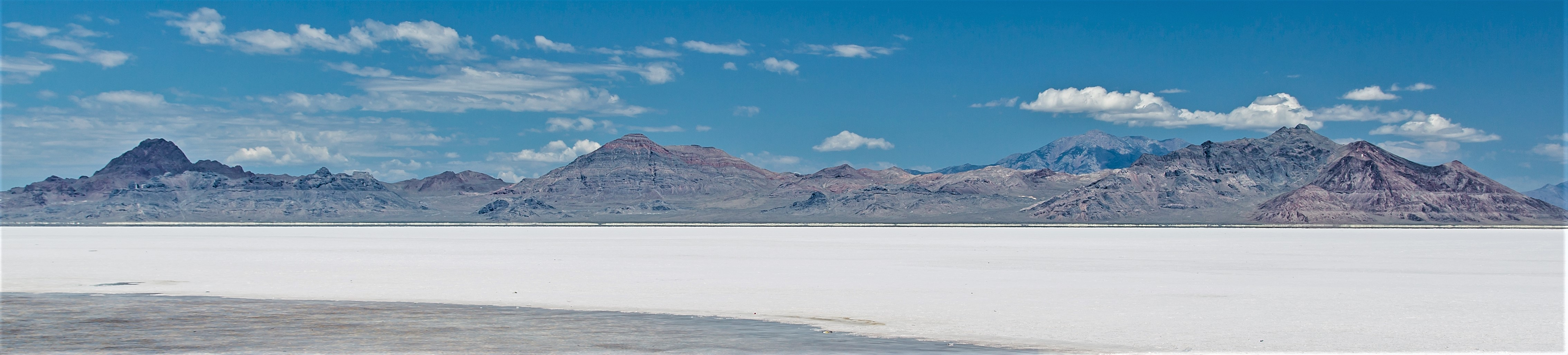
Volcano Peak (left), Rishel Peak (left of center) and Tetzlaff Peak (right) from Bonneville Salt Flats

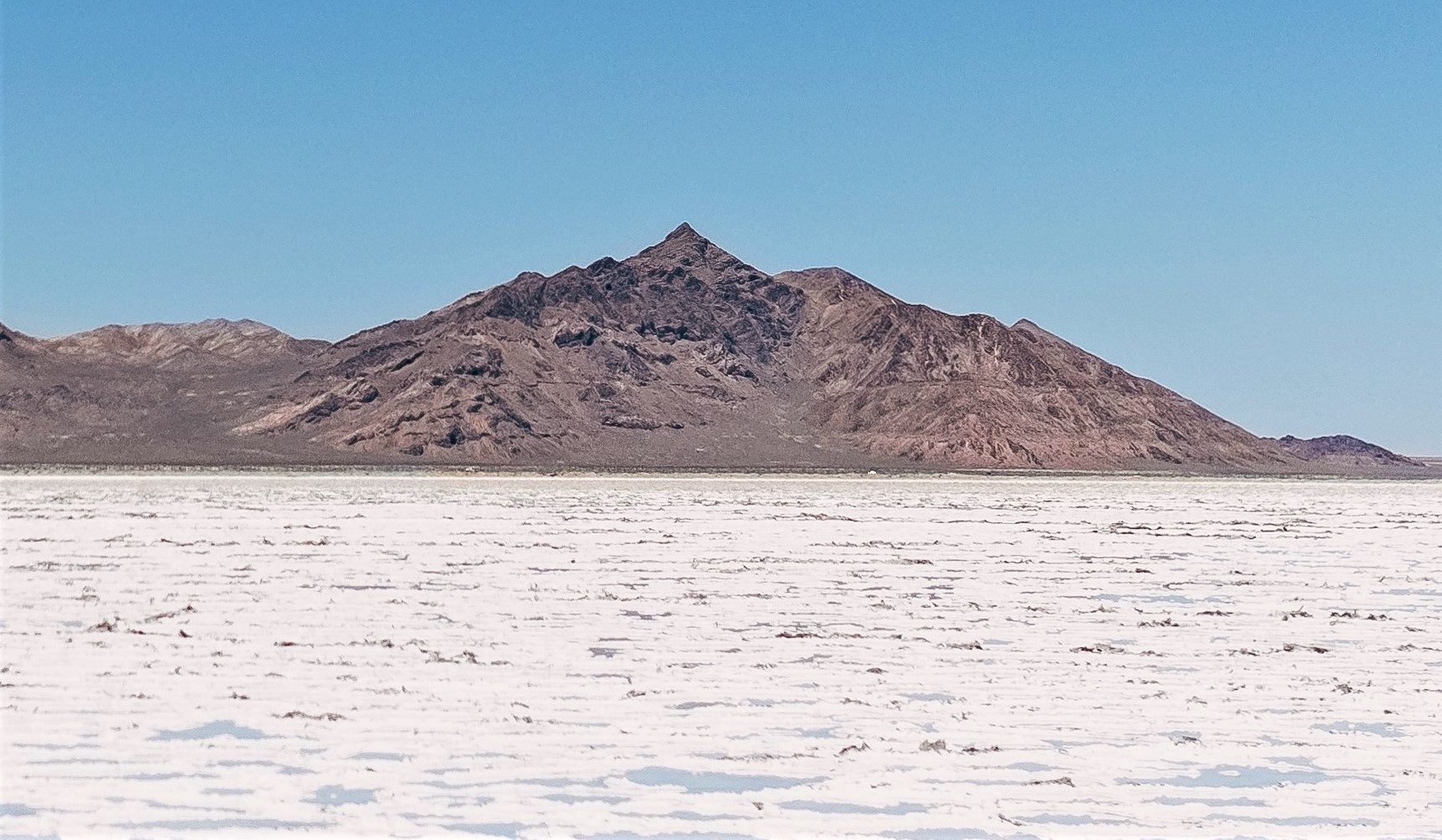
South aspect

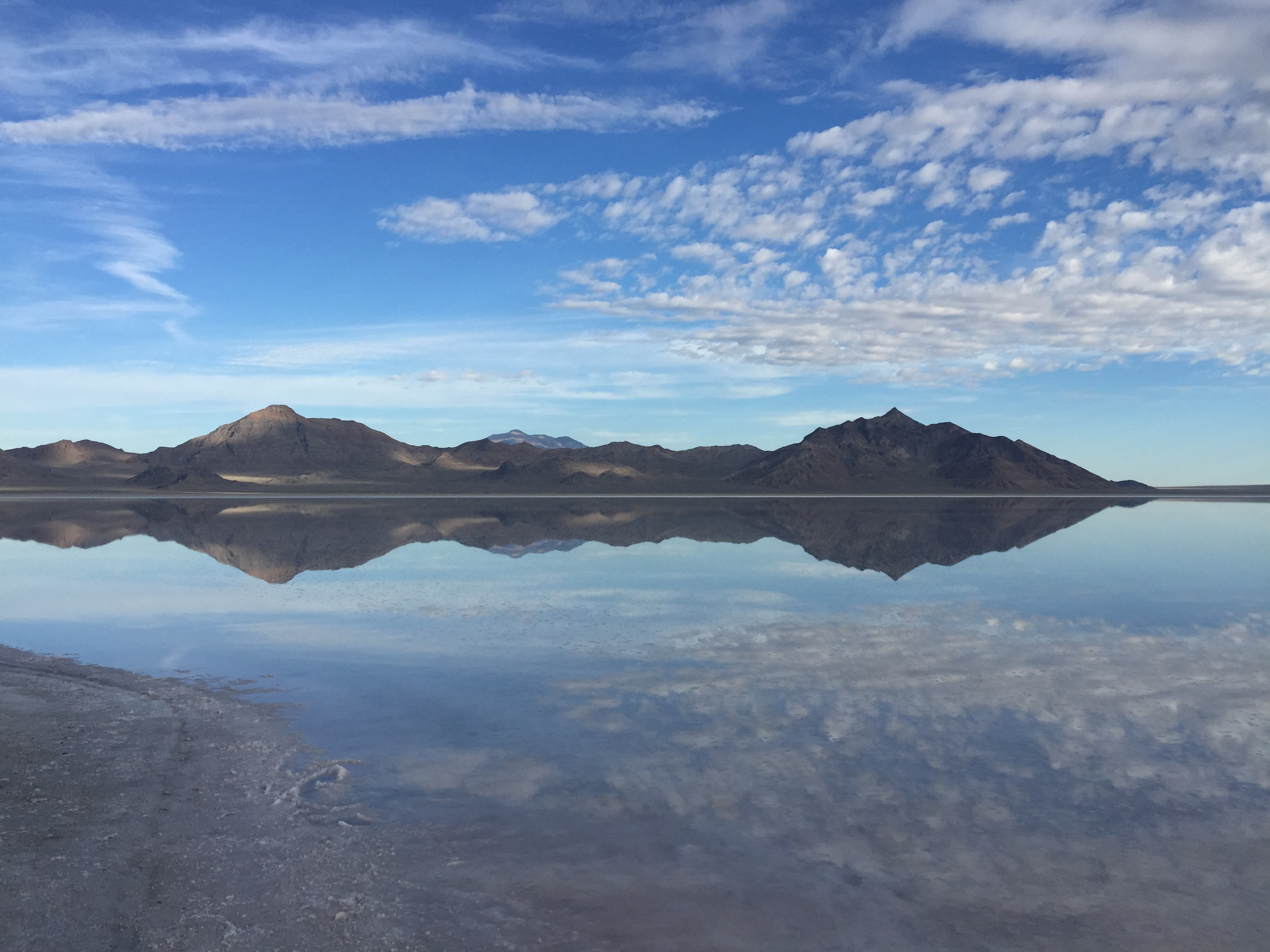
Rishel Peak (left) and Tetzlaff Peak (right)

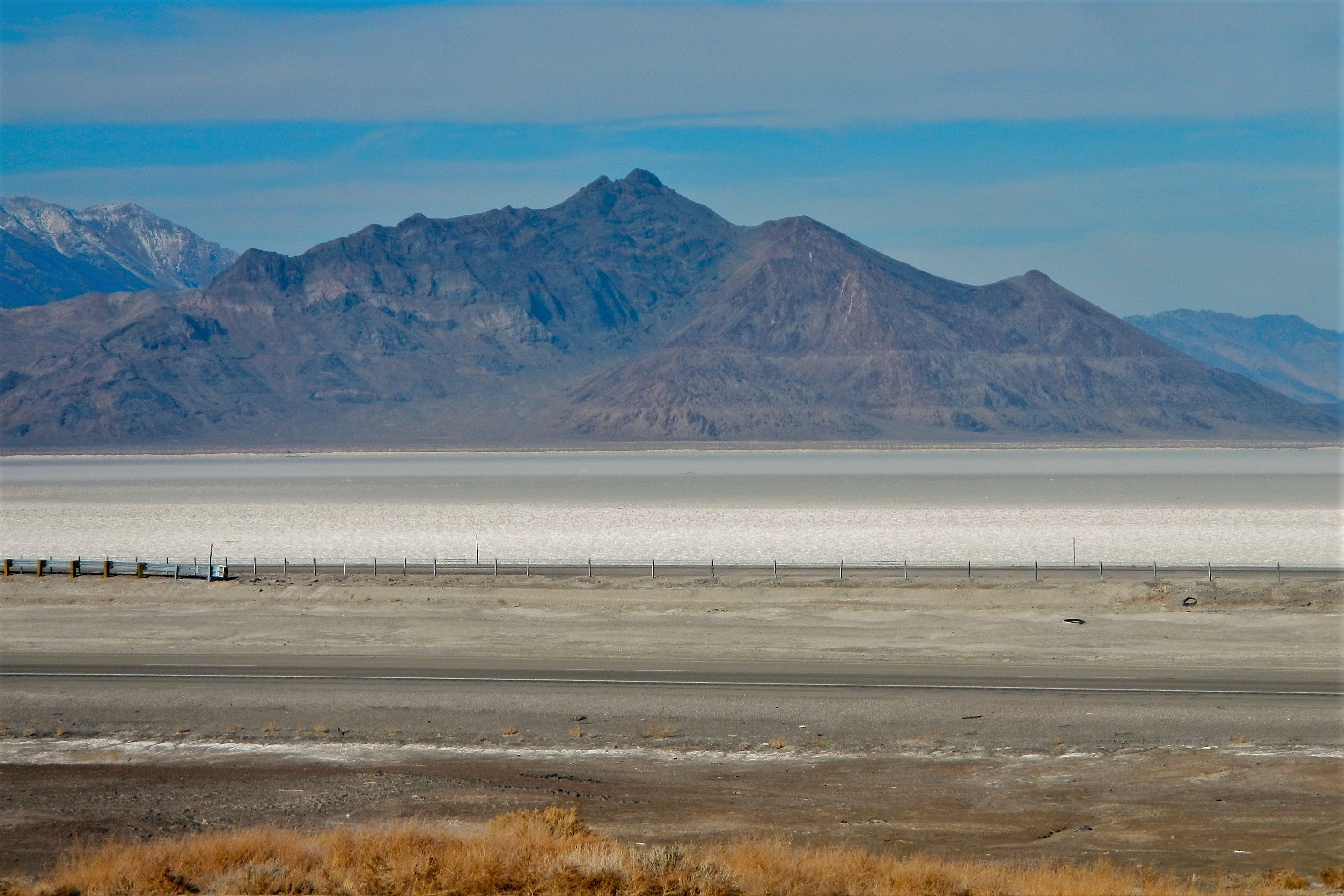
Tetzlaff Peak and Bonneville Salt Flats

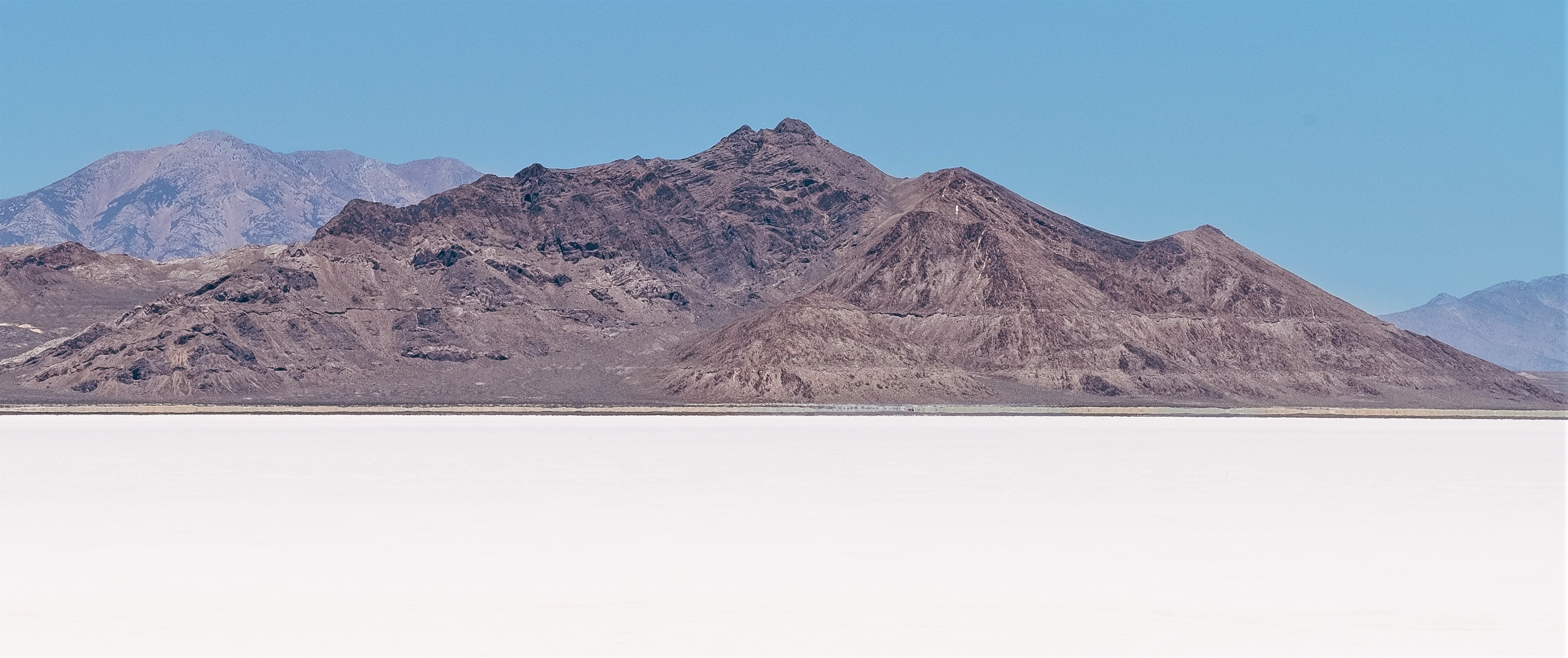
Tetzlaff Peak (center), Pilot Peak (distant left) from Bonneville Salt Flats

== See also ==
- Jenkins Peak
- List of mountain peaks of Utah
