= Graham Peak (Utah) =

Mountain in Utah, United States

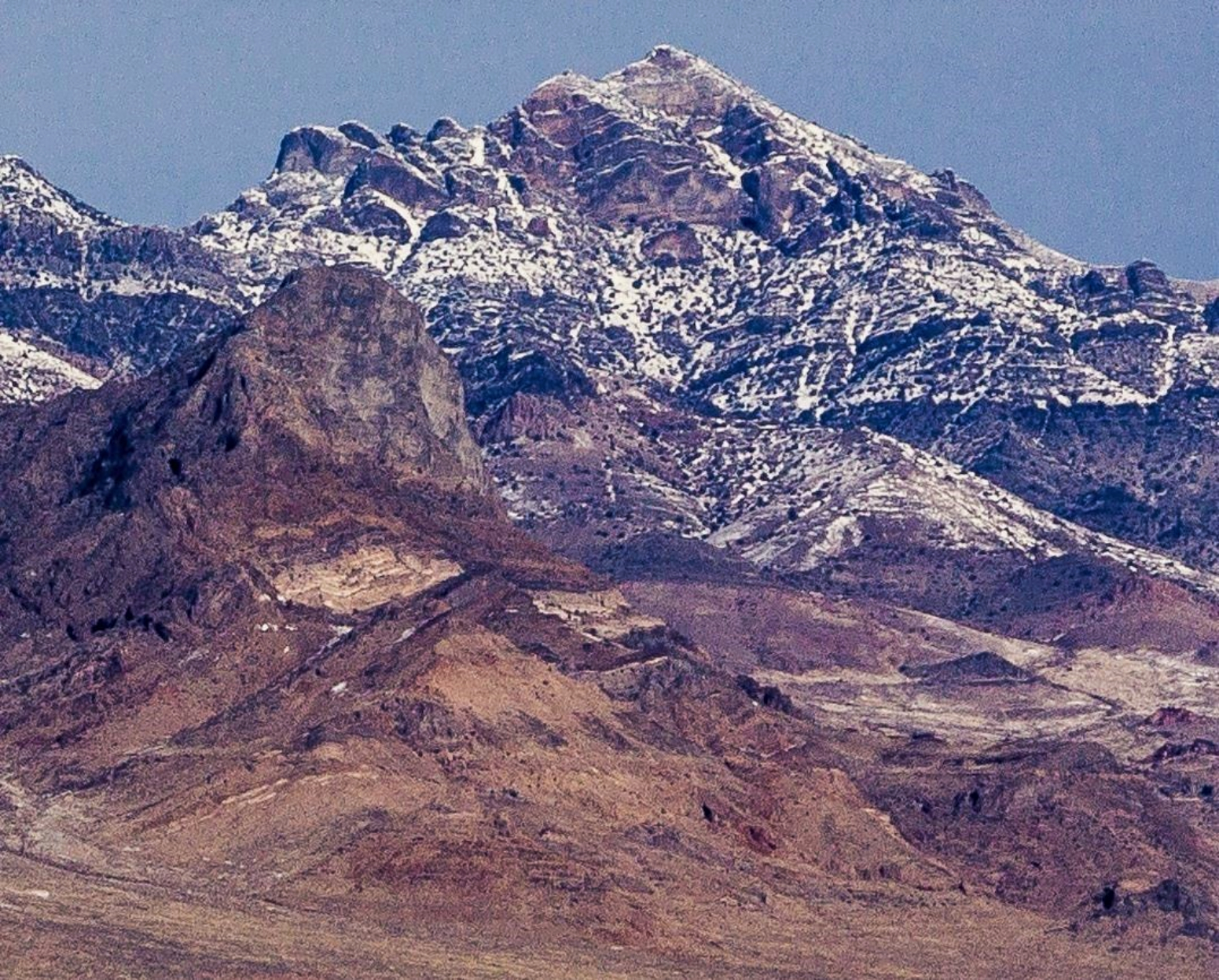
- Graham Peak

Highest point
- Elevation: 7,563 ft (2,305 m)
- Prominence: 3,043 ft (928 m)
- Isolation: 15.55 mi (25.03 km)
- Coordinates: 40°57′06″N 113°47′23″W

Naming
- Etymology: Athol Graham

Geography
- Location within Utah Location within the United States
- Location: Great Salt Lake Desert
- Country: United States of America
- State: Utah
- County: Tooele
- Parent range: Silver Island Mountains; Great Basin Ranges
- Topo map: USGS Graham Peak

Geology
- Rock age: Cambrian
- Mountain type: Fault block
- Rock type: Limestone

Climbing
- Easiest route: class 2 hiking

Graham Peak is a 7,563-foot elevation (2,305 m) mountain summit located in Tooele County, Utah, United States.

== Description ==
Graham Peak is the highest summit in the Silver Island Mountains which are a subset of the Great Basin Ranges. It is set on land controlled by the Bureau of Land Management. The community of Wendover, Utah, is 21 miles to the southwest and the Bonneville Speedway is ten miles to the south. Topographic relief is significant as the summit rises over 3,300 feet (1,000 meters) above the Bonneville Salt Flats in three miles, as well as the same above the Pilot Valley Playa. This landform's toponym was officially adopted in 1960 by the U.S. Board on Geographic Names to honor Athol Graham (1924–1960), who was the first Utahan and second American to drive over 300 MPH on land. He was killed August 1, 1960, at the Bonneville Salt Flats while attempting to set a land speed record as the first to go over 400 MPH.

== Climate ==
Graham Peak is set in the Great Salt Lake Desert which has hot summers and cold winters.Costigan The desert is an example of a cold desert climate as the desert's elevation makes temperatures cooler than lower elevation deserts. Due to the high elevation and aridity, temperatures drop sharply after sunset. Summer nights are comfortably cool. Winter highs are generally above freezing, and winter nights are bitterly cold, with temperatures often dropping well below freezing.

== See also ==
- List of mountain peaks of Utah

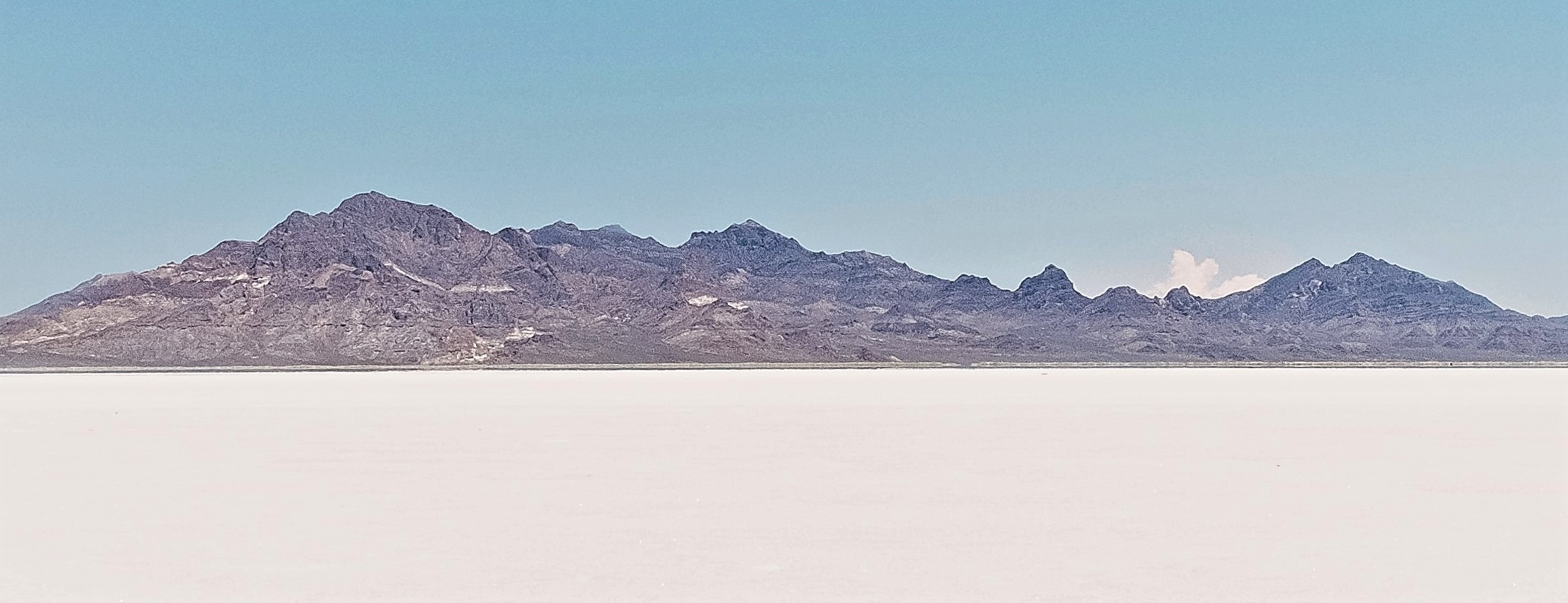
Graham Peak centered, Jenkins Peak on the left, Cobb Peak to the right, from Bonneville Salt Flats
