= Wildcat Mountain =

Wildcat Mountain is the name of 43 summits in the United States, including:

- One of 43 mountain summits in the United States:
  - Wildcat Mountain (Alabama)
  - Wildcat Mountain (Conway County, Arkansas)
  - Wildcat Mountain (Saline County, Arkansas)
  - Wildcat Mountain (Sebastian County, Arkansas)
  - Wildcat Mountain (Fresno County, California)
  - Wildcat Mountain (Mariposa County, California)-1
  - Wildcat Mountain (Mariposa County, California)-2
  - Wildcat Mountain (Sonoma County, California)
  - Wildcat Mountain (Douglas County, Colorado)
  - Wildcat Mountain (Pitkin County, Colorado)
  - Wildcat Mountain (Connecticut)
  - Wildcat Mountain (Georgia)
  - Wildcat Mountain (Laurel County, Kentucky)
  - Wildcat Mountain (Powell County, Kentucky)
  - Wildcat Mountain (Massachusetts)
  - Wildcat Mountain (Missouri) - in Iron County, Missouri
  - Wildcat Mountain (Shannon County, Missouri)
  - Wildcat Mountain (Flathead County, Montana)
  - Wildcat Mountain (Stillwater County, Montana)
  - Wildcat Mountain (Buncombe County, North Carolina)
  - Wildcat Mountain (Cherokee County, North Carolina)
  - Wildcat Mountain (Davidson County, North Carolina)
  - Wildcat Mountain (Nebraska)
  - Wildcat Mountain (New Hampshire)
  - Wildcat Mountain (Orange County, New York)
  - Wildcat Mountain (Ulster County, New York)
  - Wildcat Mountain (Oklahoma)
  - Wildcat Mountain (Clackamas County, Oregon)
  - Wildcat Mountain (Crook County, Oregon)
  - Wildcat Mountain (Linn County, Oregon)
  - Wildcat Mountain (Washington County, Oregon)
  - Wildcat Mountain (Pennsylvania)
  - Wildcat Mountain (Burnet County, Texas)
  - Wildcat Mountain (Coke County, Texas)
  - Wildcat Mountain (Edwards County, Texas)
  - Wildcat Mountain (Nolan County, Texas)
  - Wildcat Mountain (Utah)
  - Wildcat Mountain (Botetourt County, Virginia)-1
  - Wildcat Mountain (Botetourt County, Virginia)-2
  - Wildcat Mountain (Fauquier County, Virginia)
  - Wildcat Mountain (Clallam County, Washington)
  - Wildcat Mountain (Okanogan County, Washington)
  - Wildcat Mountain (Wisconsin)
- Other:
  - Wildcat Mountain Ski Area in New Hampshire
  - Battle of Camp Wildcat (Battle of Wildcat Mountain), an American Civil War battle in Laurel County, Kentucky
