= Silver Island Range =

Mountain in the American state of Utah

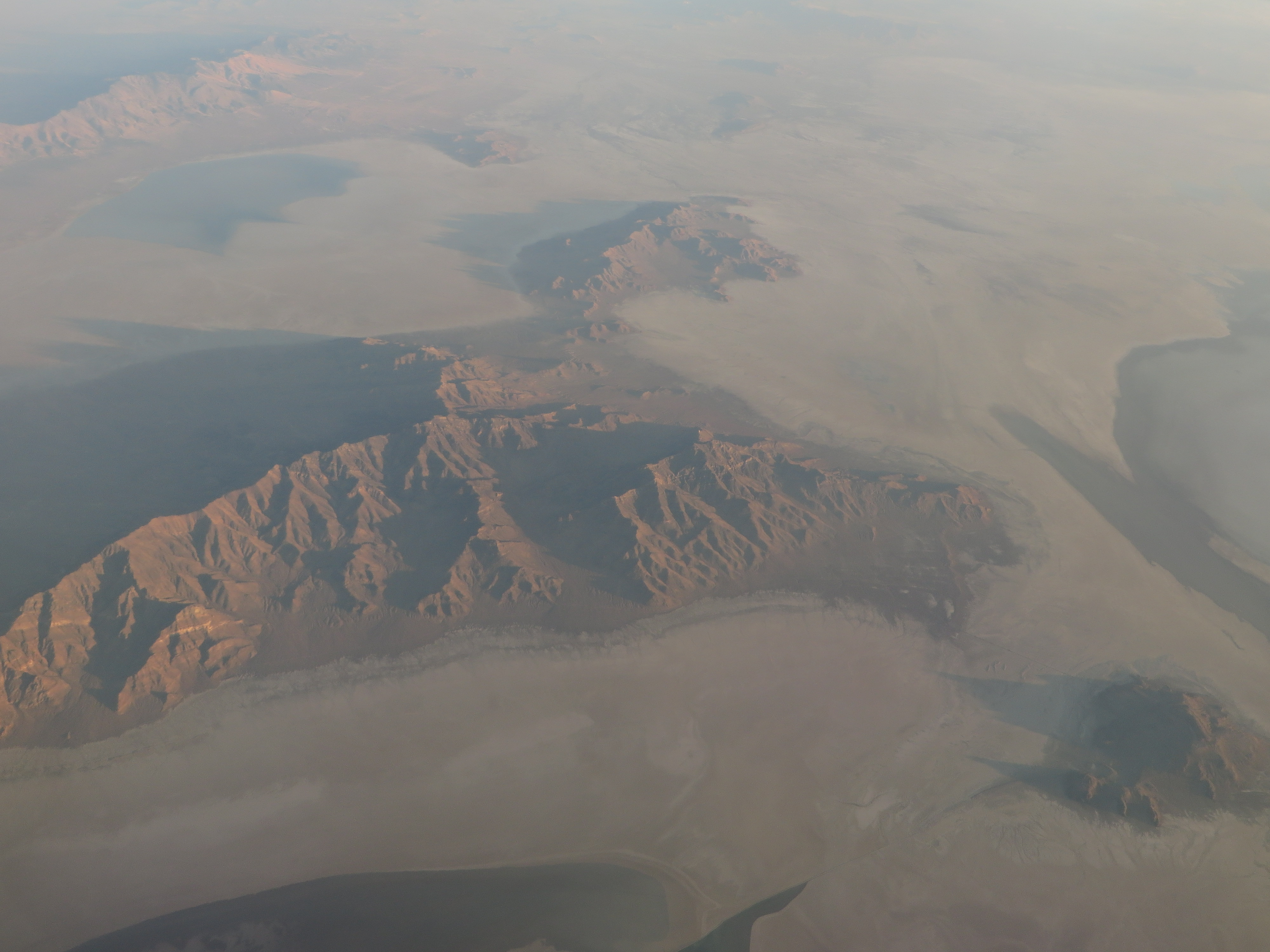
- Aerial view

Highest point
- Peak: Graham Peak
- Elevation: 7,563 ft (2,305 m)
- Coordinates: 40.93°N 113.81°W

Dimensions
- Area: 55.2 mi^{2} (143 km^{2})

Geography
- Country: United States
- State: Utah
- Peaks: Graham Peak and Cobb Peak (7021 ft)
- Borders on: Pilot Valley Playa, Great Salt Lake Desert and Bonneville Salt Flats

The Silver Island Range, also called the Silver Island Mountains, is a mountain range in Utah, United States, situated the northwest corner of Tooele County and the southwest corner of Box Elder County, about 15 miles (24 km) northeast of Wendover.

The Silver Island Range lies at the west perimeter of the Great Salt Lake Desert; the southeast flank of the range is on the northwest border of the Bonneville Salt Flats.

== Geography ==
The Silver Island Range is a rough triangular area which extends 32 miles (51 km) into Utah from the Utah - Nevada border, with the Pilot Valley Playa to the west and the Great Salt Lake Desert to the east. The wilderness area includes 35,300 acres (14,300 ha) with sloping stream terraces, foothills, canyons, and steep mountains. Elevation starts at 5,200 feet (1,600 m) at the base of the range, to more than 7,000 feet (2,100 m) at the summits. The four tallest peaks in the range are Graham Peak, at 7,563 feet (2,305 m), Campbell Peak 7,272 feet (2,217 m), Jenkins Peak 7,268 feet (2,215 m), and Cobb Peak, at 7,021 feet (2,140 m). Other peaks include Tetzlaff Peak, Rishel Peak, and Volcano Peak. With no perennial streams, vegetation on the rocky slopes is sparse, consisting of juniper, sagebrush, ricegrass and ephedra along with other desert shrubs and grasses.

== Geology ==
Bedrock in the range includes faulted and folded fossil bearing limestones. The slopes of the range have been terraced by shoreline erosion and deposition from Lake Bonneville.

== History ==
Historically, several caves in the Silver Island Range served as habitation for Native Americans. The range also played a role in the more recent mining history of the region, and stood as both a barrier and landmark to pioneers who crossed the inhospitable Salt Lake Desert. Donner Canyon in the northeast section of the range bears the name of the Donner-Reed party, who passed north of the area on the Hastings Cutoff.

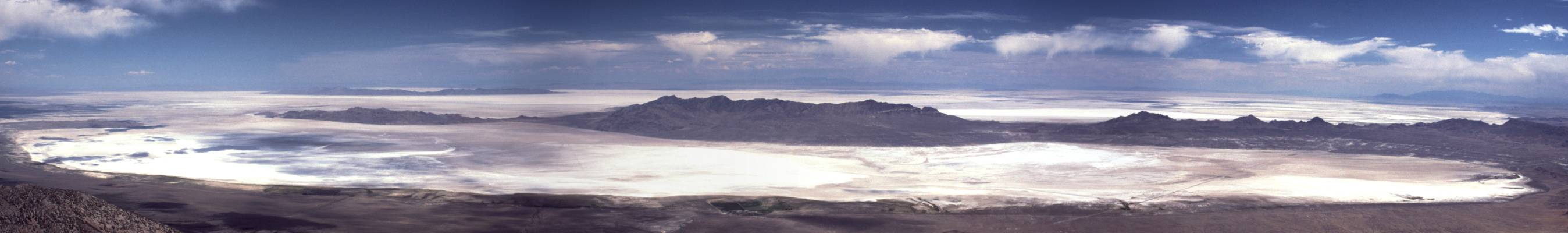
View ESE of the Great Salt Lake Desert-(Pilot Valley Playa foreground) and northwest flank of Silver Island Mountains as seen from Pilot Peak-(Pilot Range)-15 mi NW. (The north of the Deep Creek Range, (Gold Hill, Utah) at photo right. Also, on horizona, (center-left, ~35-mi) the Newfoundland Mountains, in the salt flats.)

== Modern uses ==
The Silver Island Range is used for all-terrain vehicle driving, camping, caving, hiking, hunting, mining, and rockhounding.
