= Pilot Valley Playa (Nevada and Utah) =

Geologic feature in Nevada and Utah

- Location within Utah
- Floor elevation: 4,200 ft (1,300 m)
- Length: 30 mi (50 km), north to south
- Width: 5–10 mi (8–16 km)

Geography
- Location: Utah and Nevada, United States
- Borders on: west: Pilot Range southeast: Silver Island Range
- Coordinates: 41°00′N 113°54′W
- Interactive map of Pilot Valley Playa

The Pilot Valley Playa is a playa and salt pan in Box Elder County, Utah and Elko County, Nevada that is a remnant of Pleistocene Lake Bonneville. Located in northwestern Utah and northeastern Nevada, the Pilot Valley Playa varies from five to ten miles wide, and is thirty miles long, with an elevation just above 4200 feet. It is bordered by the Pilot Mountains to the west, and the Silver Island Mountains to the southeast.

Springs are located in the alluvial fans at the base of the Pilot Range, and no water flows from the Silver Island Mountains. Shallow groundwater (e.g., Bettridge Creek, with threatened Lahotan cutthroat trout) along the western edge of the playa varies from fresh water to brine over a distance of about 2,000 feet.

== Pilot-Thousand Springs Watershed ==
The Pilot Valley Playa gets very little precipitation, experiences extreme temperatures and high wind speeds.

The playa is within the Pilot-Thousand Springs Watershed (USGS Huc 16020307), a 1,780 sq mi (4,600 km^{2}) endorheic area.

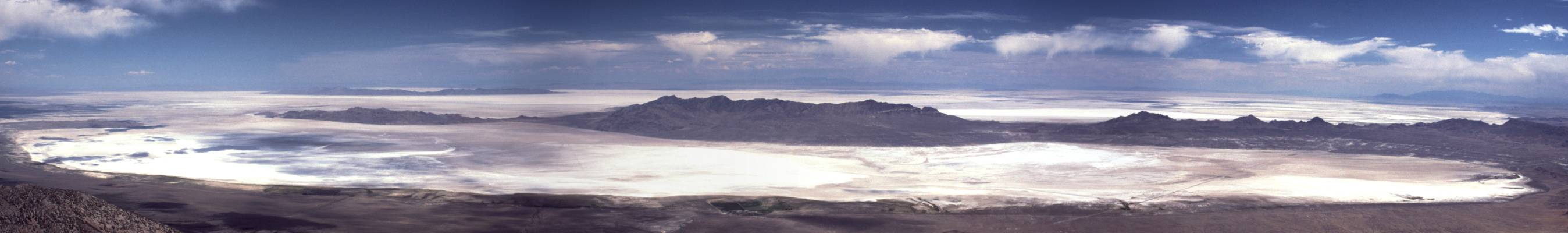
View ESE of the Great Salt Lake Desert and northwest flank of Silver Island Mountains as seen from Pilot Peak, 15 mi NW.
