= Cobb Peak (Utah) =

Mountain in Tooele County, Utah, US

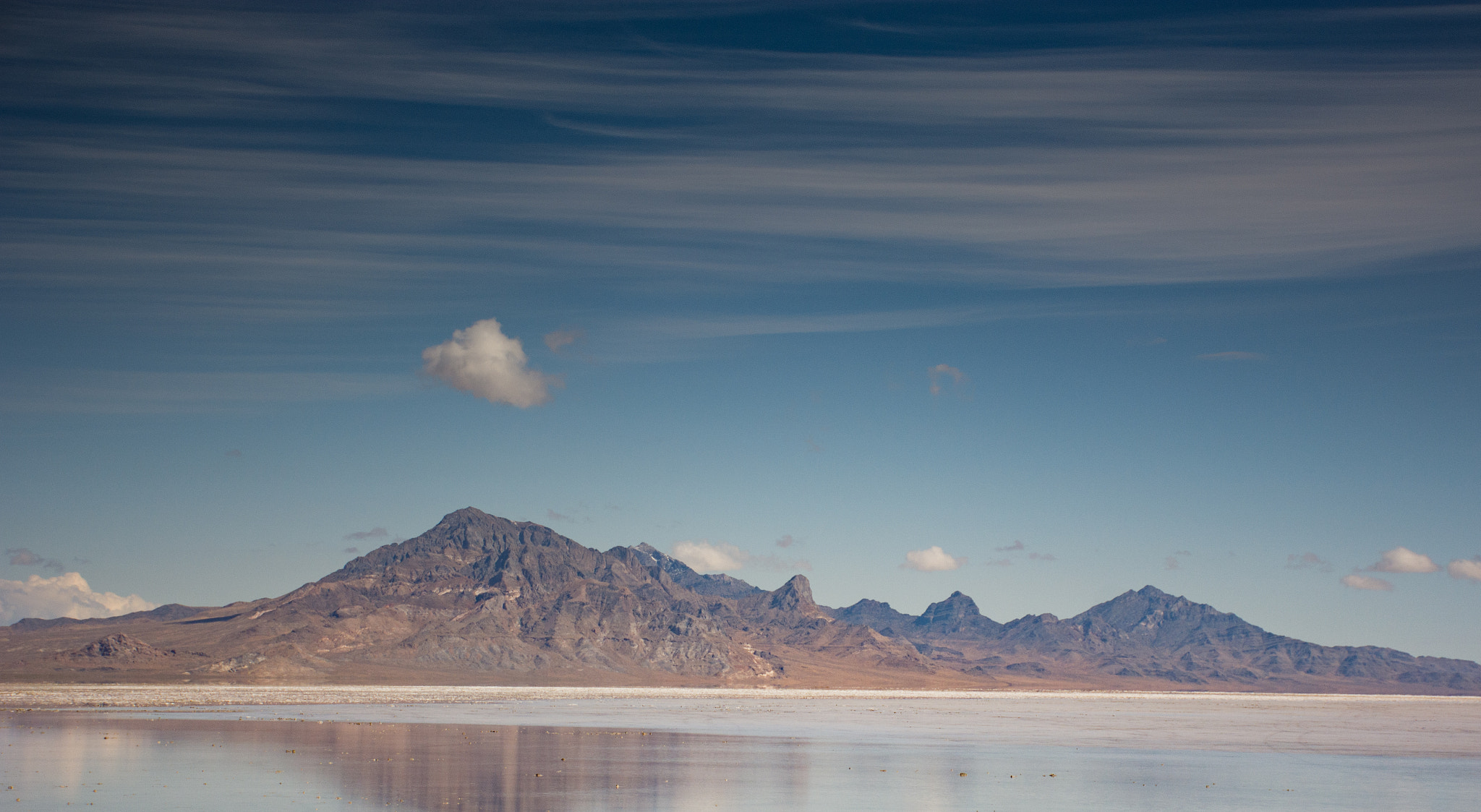
- Cobb Peak on the right, Jenkins Peak (left); South aspect, from Bonneville Salt Flats

Highest point
- Elevation: 7,021 ft (2,140 m)
- Prominence: 1,581 ft (482 m)
- Parent peak: Graham Peak (7,563 ft)
- Isolation: 3.05 mi (4.91 km)
- Coordinates: 40°57′35″N 113°43′55″W

Naming
- Etymology: John Cobb

Geography
- Location within Utah Location within the United States
- Location: Great Salt Lake Desert
- Country: United States of America
- State: Utah
- County: Tooele
- Parent range: Silver Island Mountains; Great Basin Ranges
- Topo map: USGS Floating Island

Geology
- Rock age: Cambrian
- Mountain type: Fault block
- Rock type: Limestone

Cobb Peak is a 7,021-foot elevation (2,140 m) mountain summit located in Tooele County, Utah, United States.

== Description ==
Cobb Peak is the fourth-highest summit in the Silver Island Mountains which are a subset of the Great Basin Ranges. It is set on land administered by the Bureau of Land Management. The Bonneville Speedway is 12 miles to the southwest and line parent Graham Peak is three miles to the west. Topographic relief is significant as the summit rises 2,800 feet (850 meters) above the Bonneville Salt Flats in two miles. This landform's toponym was officially adopted in 1960 by the U.S. Board on Geographic Names to honor John Cobb (1899–1952), an English racing driver who set three land speed records at the Bonneville Salt Flats, including a record 394 MPH on September 16, 1947.

== Climate ==
Cobb Peak is set in the Great Salt Lake Desert which has hot summers and cold winters. The desert is an example of a cold desert climate as the desert's elevation makes temperatures cooler than lower elevation deserts. Due to the high elevation and aridity, temperatures drop sharply after sunset. Summer nights are comfortably cool. Winter highs are generally above freezing, and winter nights are bitterly cold, with temperatures often dropping well below freezing.

== Gallery ==
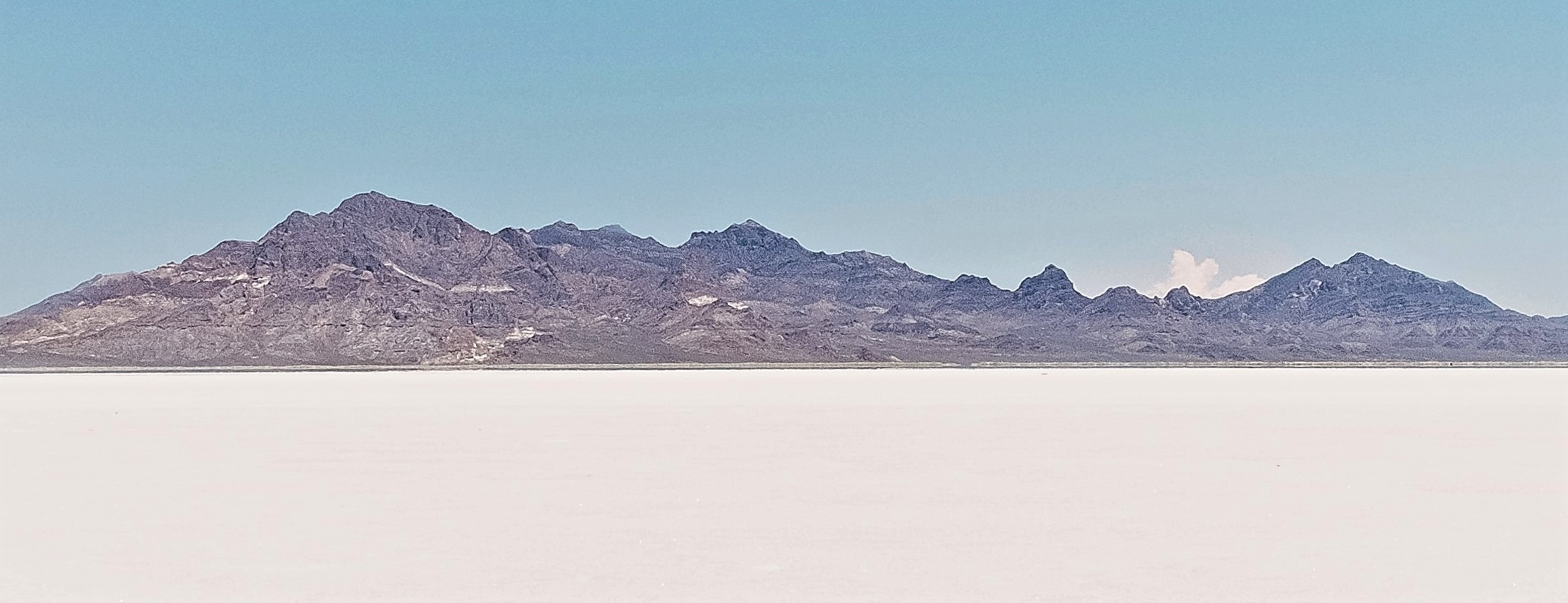
Jenkins Peak (left), Graham Peak (center), and Cobb Peak to the right.

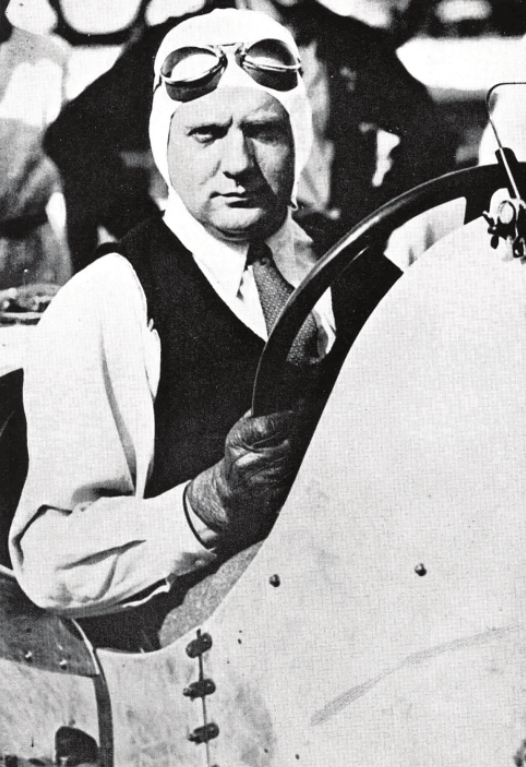
John Cobb

== See also ==
- List of mountain peaks of Utah
