= Jenkins Peak =

Summit in Tooele County, Utah, United States

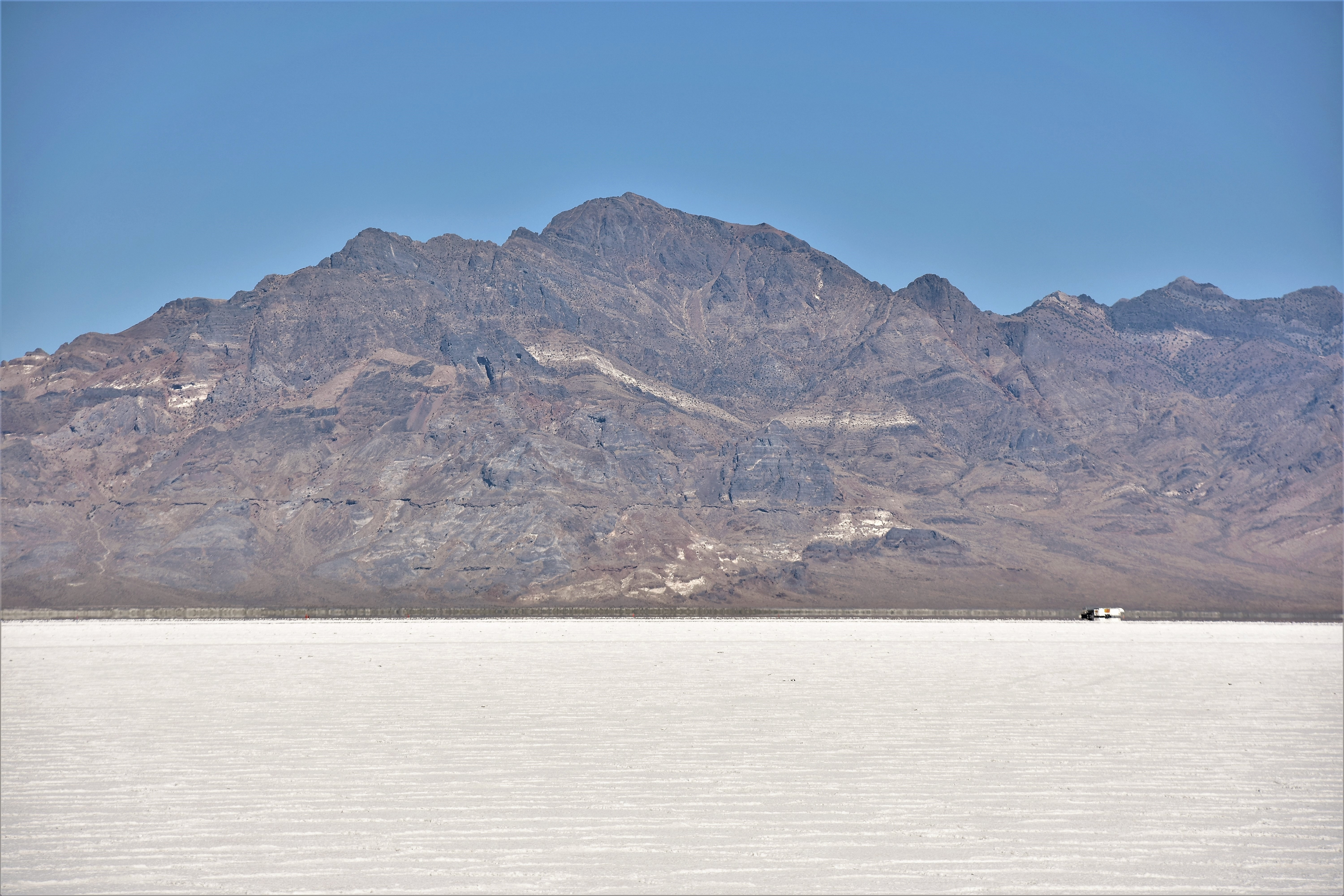
- South aspect, from Bonneville Salt Flats

Highest point
- Elevation: 7,268 ft (2,215 m)
- Prominence: 628 ft (191 m)
- Parent peak: Campbell Peak (7,272 ft)
- Isolation: 2.28 mi (3.67 km)
- Coordinates: 40°54′23″N 113°49′37″W

Naming
- Etymology: Ab Jenkins

Geography
- Location within Utah Location within the United States
- Location: Great Salt Lake Desert
- Country: United States of America
- State: Utah
- County: Tooele
- Parent range: Silver Island Mountains; Great Basin Ranges
- Topo map: USGS Graham Peak

Geology
- Rock age: Cambrian
- Mountain type: Fault block
- Rock type: Limestone

Jenkins Peak is a 7,268-foot elevation (2,215 m) mountain summit in Tooele County, Utah, United States.

== Description ==
Jenkins Peak is the third-highest summit in the Silver Island Mountains which are a subset of the Great Basin Ranges. It is set on land controlled by the Bureau of Land Management. The community of Wendover, Utah, is 17 miles to the southwest and the Bonneville Speedway is eight miles to the south. Topographic relief is significant as the summit rises over 3,000 feet (910 meters) above the Bonneville Salt Flats in two miles. This landform's toponym was officially adopted in 1960 by the U.S. Board on Geographic Names to honor David Abbott "Ab" Jenkins (1883–1956), a professional race car driver who was interested in land speed records at the Bonneville Salt Flats. He was instrumental in establishing Bonneville as a location for such events, and was elected Mayor of Salt Lake City in 1940.

== Climate ==
Jenkins Peak is set in the Great Salt Lake Desert which has hot summers and cold winters. The desert is an example of a cold desert climate as the desert's elevation makes temperatures cooler than lower elevation deserts. Due to the high elevation and aridity, temperatures drop sharply after sunset. Summer nights are comfortably cool. Winter highs are generally above freezing, and winter nights are bitterly cold, with temperatures often dropping well below freezing.

== Gallery ==
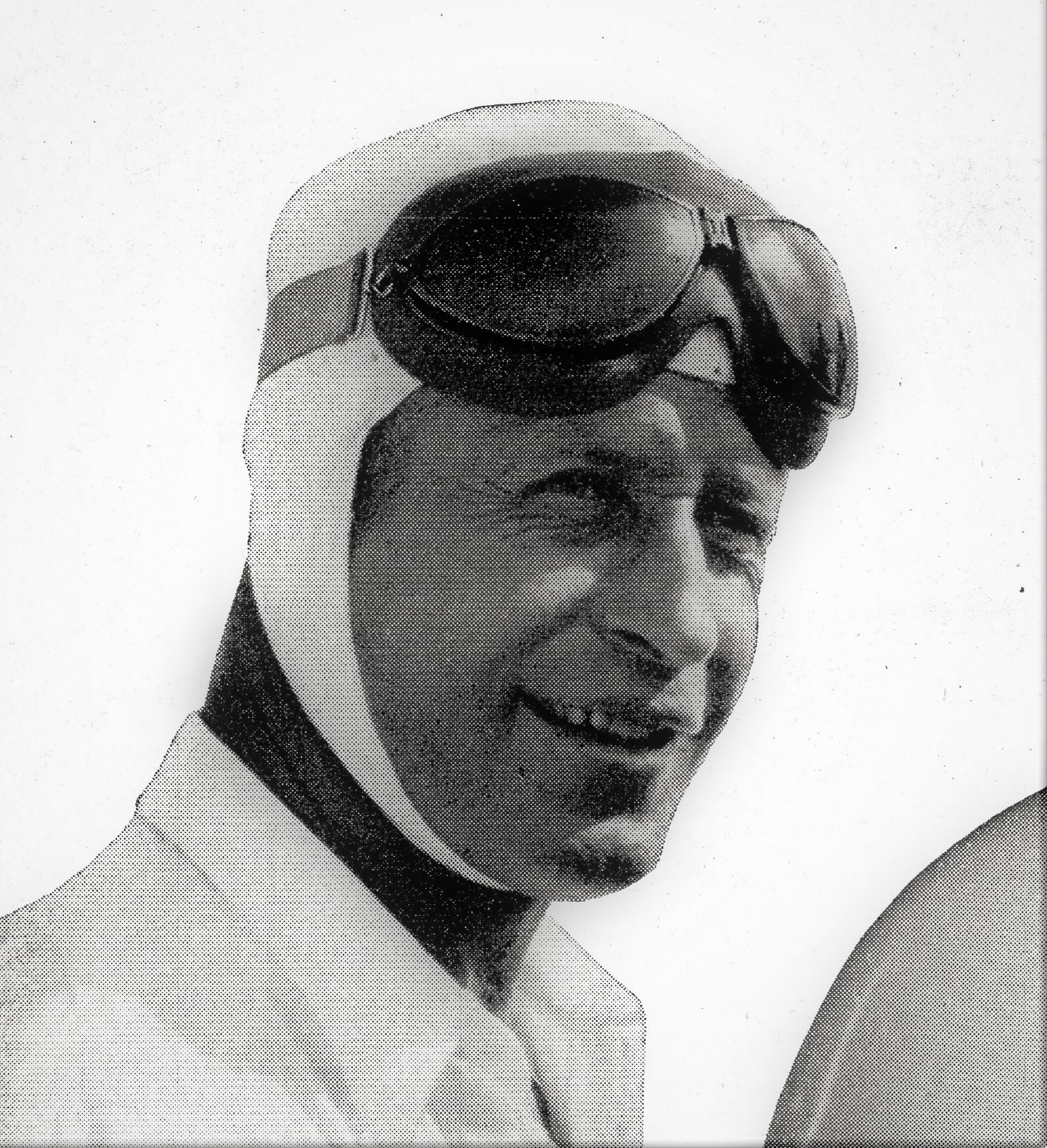
Ab Jenkins

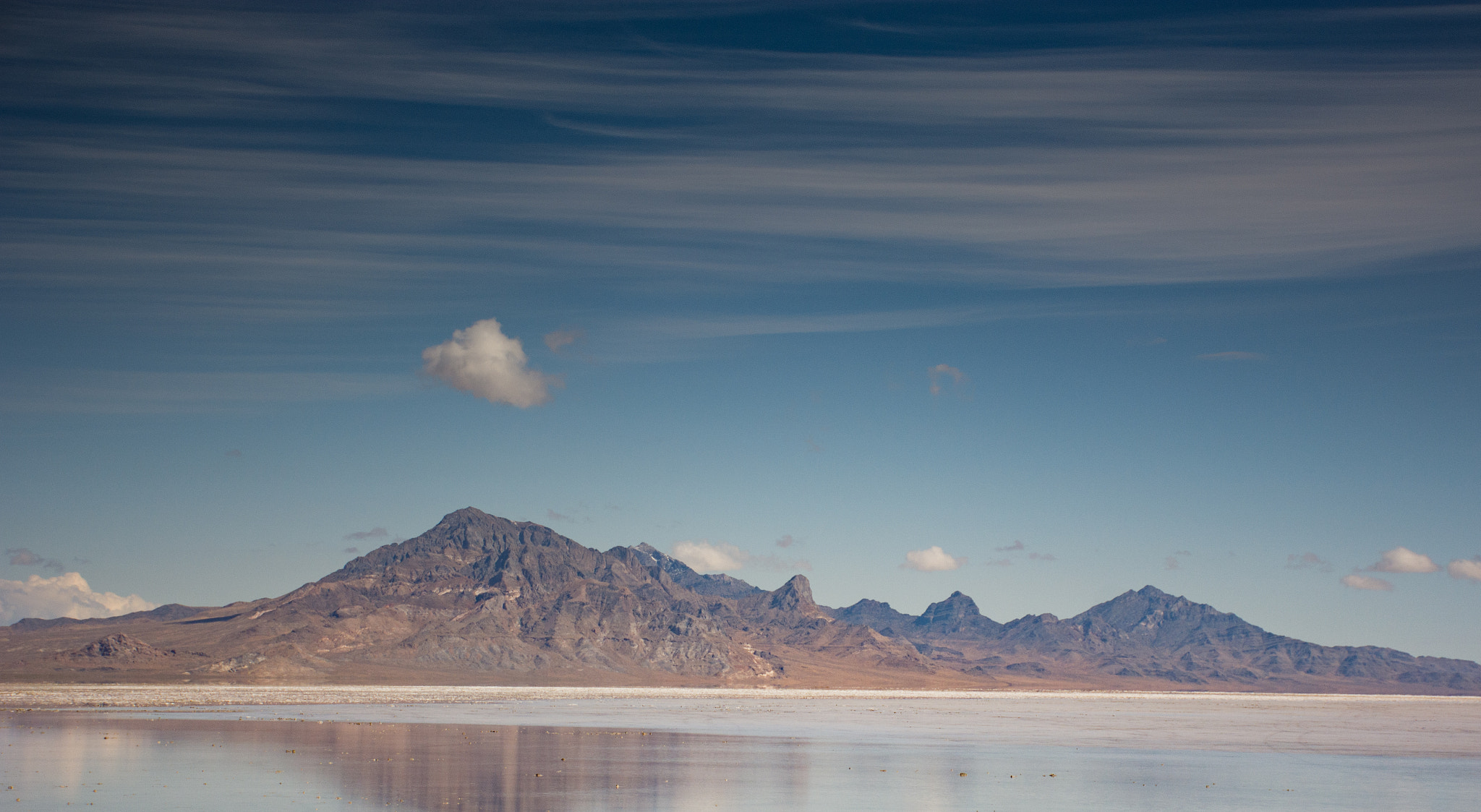
Jenkins Peak (left) below cloud

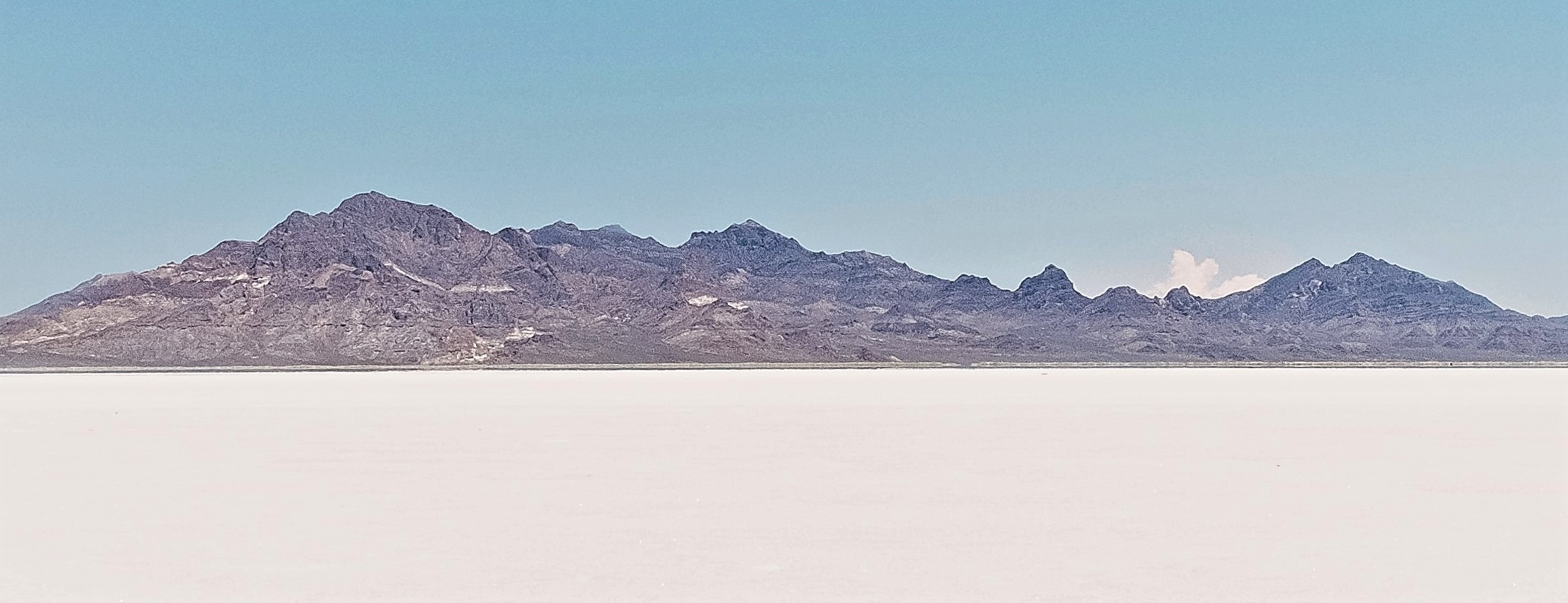
Jenkins Peak on the left, Graham Peak at center, and Cobb Peak to the right.

== See also ==
- List of mountain peaks of Utah
