= Ab Jenkins =

American racing driver and politician

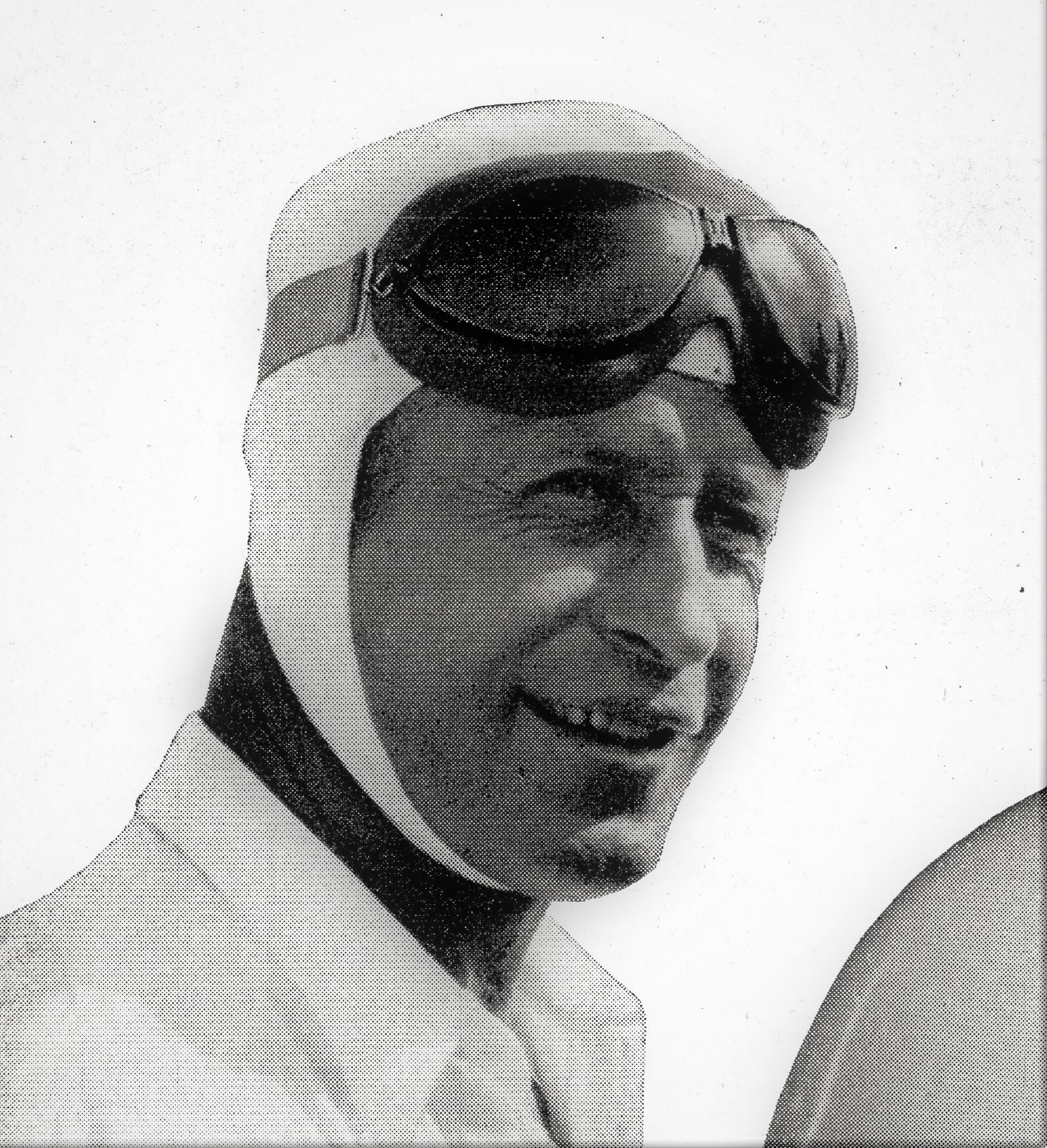
- Born: David Abbott Jenkins; January 25, 1883; Spanish Fork, Utah Territory, U.S.
- Died: August 9, 1956 (aged 73); Milwaukee, Wisconsin, U.S.
- Resting place: Wasatch Lawn Memorial Park, Salt Lake City, Utah
- Known for: set numerous World land speed records, 15 of which remain current, mayor of Salt Lake City, Utah 1940-1944. when he died, at age 73, in 1956, he had established more world's automobile records than any man in history.
- Spouse: Evelyn Thorstenberg Jenkins
- Children: 3

David Abbott "Ab" Jenkins (January 25, 1883 – August 9, 1956) was the 24th mayor of Salt Lake City, Utah between 1940 and 1944. He was a professional race car driver. Jenkins' interest in motorsports began with racing motorcycles on dirt tracks and across country. He then became interested in land speed records at the Bonneville Salt Flats. He was instrumental in establishing Bonneville as a location for such events, and in attracting overseas drivers such as George Eyston and Sir Malcolm Campbell to compete there.

Jenkins drove the "Mormon Meteor", a customized Duesenberg car, to a 24-hour average land speed record of 135 miles per hour (217 km/h) in 1935. In 1940 Jenkins set the 24-hour record of a 161.180 mph (259.394 km/h) average that lasted for 50 years (until 1990).

Jenkins died of a heart attack on a visit to Milwaukee, Wisconsin.

== Safety record ==
Often referred to as "The World's Safest Speedster," Jenkins was the father of salt racing. The distance he drove in 50 years included nearly three million kilometers, which included 42 coast-to-coast trips across the continental United States. There were two speed runs, however, after 1931, he confined his efforts to the track alone.

== Early days and records ==
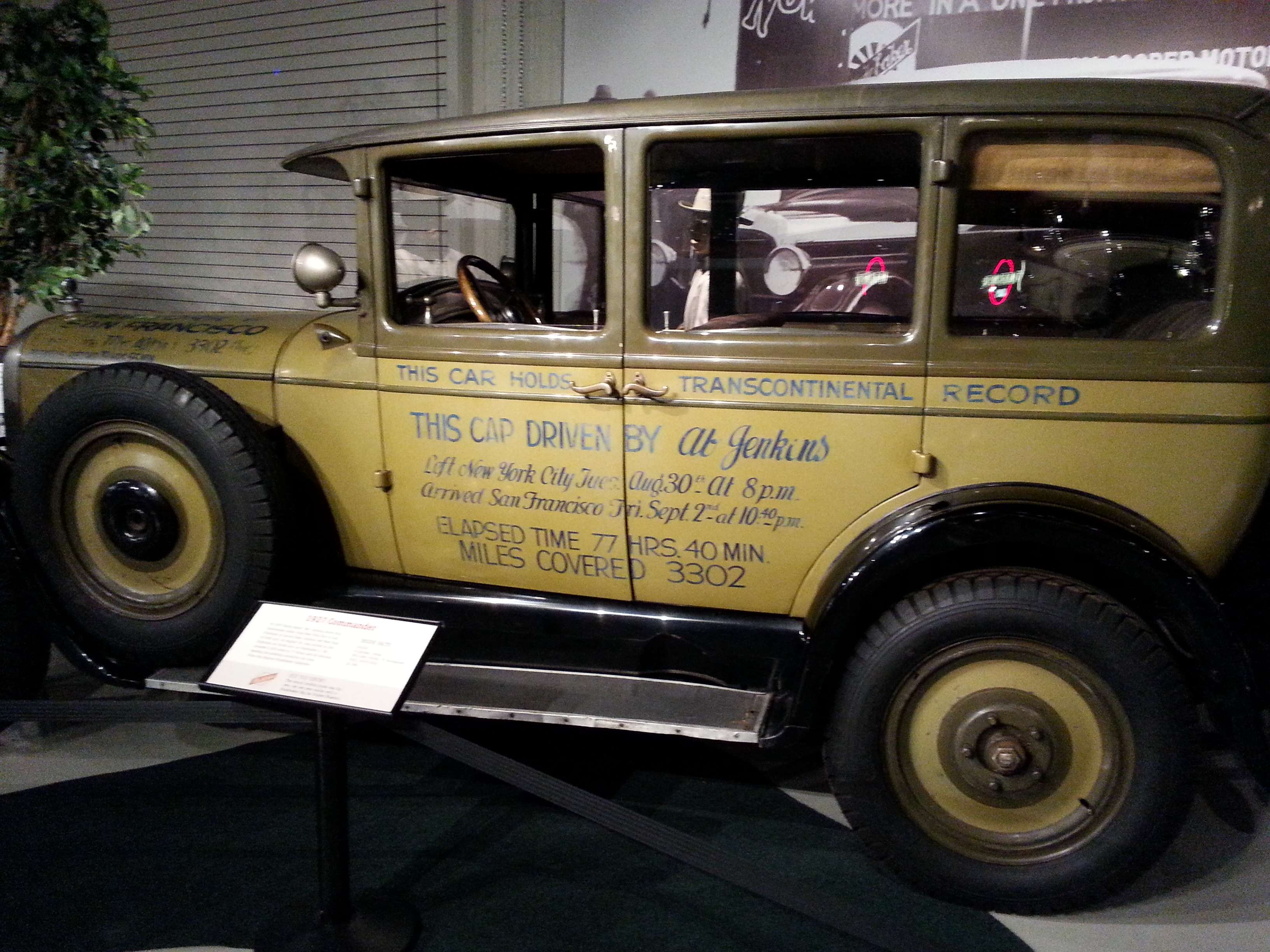
Ab Jenkins' 1927 Studebaker Commander

Jenkins, a home building contractor in Utah who was born in 1883, gained his first taste of racing a Studebaker on the Union Pacific train from Salt Lake City to Wendover in 1925, beating the smoke-belcher by five minutes. A few years later, in 1927, he drove from New York City to San Francisco in a Studebaker touring sedan in 86 hours, 20 minutes, a time that was 14 hours faster than the train. A series of records were set in Pierce-Arrows as well as a sixty-eight miles per hour (109 km/h) run on the Salt Flats on an Allis-Chalmers tractor, which he remarked was "like riding a frightened bison" before building a series of cars manufactured specifically for the Salt Flats.

In 1925, Jenkins was hired by Pierce-Arrow to soup up their newly introduced V12 engine which produced a disappointing level of performance at the time. He managed to coax 175 miles per hour (282 km/h) out of the engine, driving a Pierce-Arrow along the Utah salt flats at over 100 miles per hour (160 km/h) in a 24-hour journey along a 10-mile (16 km) course. As a result of the run, a total distance of 2,710 miles (4,360 kilometers) was covered. It was in the following year that he set out to break that record by driving 25 hours and 30 minutes at around 117 miles per hour (188 km/h) and making a total of 3,000 miles (4,800 km) in the process. He was due to attempt the 1931 Indianapolis 500, but fell ill, and his car was driven by Tony Gulotta.

The Bonneville Salt Flats became more popular during the 1930s as speed records were being broken regularly, so it was deemed that the sands of Daytona Beach or the Monthlhéry track in France were preferable to the sands of the Bonneville Salt Flats. During the summer of 1935, the course was gaining international attention and in July of that year, Jenkins provided accommodations to British driver John Cobb and even relinquished his spot on the flats to him. During the course of the run, Cobb was able to break Jenkins' records and set a new one.

In late 1935, Jenkins drove a new supercharged Duesenberg Model J which allowed him to retake his title from John Cobb, but the land speed record in that race fell to another British competitor, Malcolm Campbell, who drove the aircraft-engine-powered Blue Bird V to a record two-way average speed of 301 miles per hour (484 km/h).

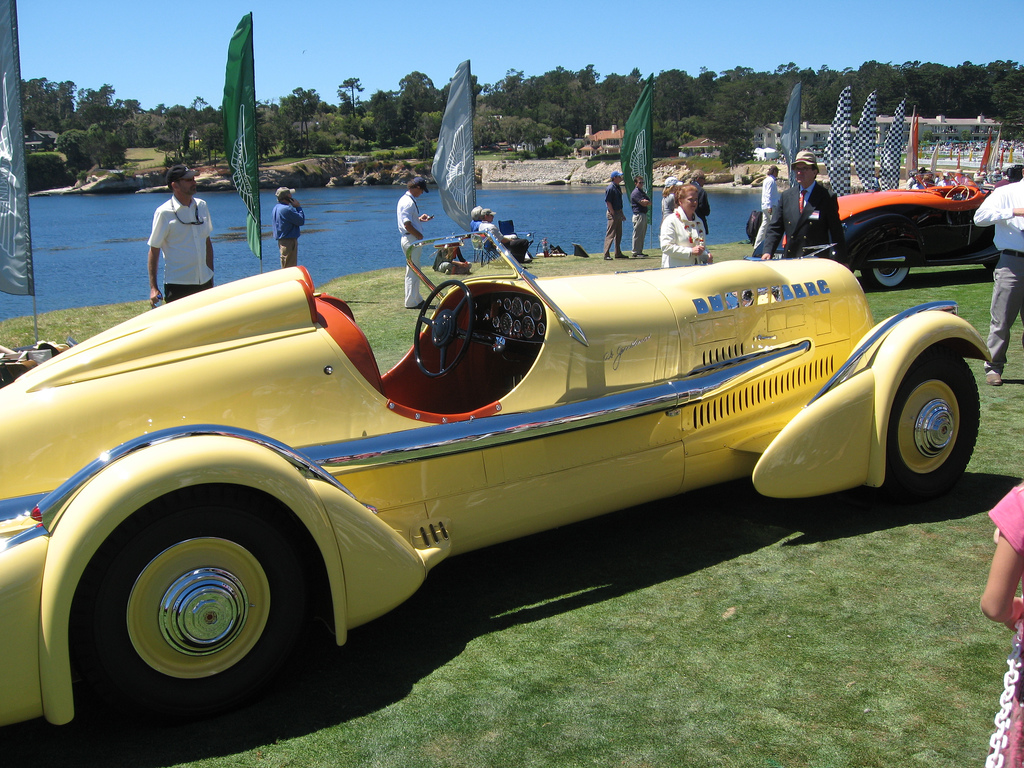
The Mormon Meteor, at the 2007 Pebble Beach Concours d'Elegance

Realizing that he needed even more power to stay on top, Jenkins equipped his car with a Curtiss Conqueror aircraft engine. The Salt Lake City newspaper Deseret News ran a contest to give the vehicle a name, which ended up being dubbed the "Mormon Meteor". Due to extensive modifications needed to accommodate the Curtiss engine, it quickly became the Mormon Meteor II and Jenkins broke land speed endurance records with it during 1936–37.

In 1938, Jenkins debuted the Mormon Meteor III, setting even more records. The most notable was in 1940 when Jenkins managed 3,868 miles (6,225 km) in 24 hours at an average speed of 161 mph (259 km/h), a record that stayed unchallenged until 2005.

During WWII, the US government ordered a halt to racing activities and Jenkins decided to run for mayor of Salt Lake City, winning handily despite spending no time or money campaigning.

After the war, Jenkins resumed racing. On July 20, 1951, his car skidded on a puddle of water and struck a row of course markers at a speed of nearly 200 miles per hour (320 km/h). The radiator was punctured by the accident and Jenkins had to halt his overheating vehicle. He had stopped three minutes short of breaking a new one-hour speed record and at the age of 68, he decided it was time to retire.

Jenkins was a religious man known for driving his “Mormon Meteor” speed machines. He became pals with New York Metropolitan Opera Singer Richard Bonelli when they were working as mechanics before Bonelli discovered he could sing. Bonelli attended many of Jenkins record runs and often instigated a song fest with spectators joining the famous baritone as Ab whizzed past. Jenkins racing fame coupled with his outgoing nature got him elected Mayor of Salt Lake in 1940 without ever giving a speech, or spending money on a campaign. He served until 1944 setting 21 speed records while in office. His one-man 24-hour record averaging 161 mph (259 km/h), stood for 50 years, beaten in 1990 by an eight driver team. Jenkins's exhausting, 48-hour record is still on the books together with 15 other FIA records from 1940.

After some full day runs, Jenkins would hop out clean-shaven, having used a safety razor after the last gas stop while circling the track at over 125 miles per hour (201 km/h) with no windshield.

In 1956, Pontiac executives petitioned Jenkins to make a comeback. In one of his final interviews that June, he reported that his health was good and he felt up to it. Jenkins and his son Marvin to drive its stock-model Series 860 Pontiac around the famous 10-mile (16 km) salt circle track. The pair recorded an average speed of 118.375 miles per hour (190.506 km/h) shattering all existing American unlimited and Class C stock-car racing records in the process.

Ab drove almost two-thirds of the 2,841 miles (4,572 km) himself gulping down milk and orange juice handed to him by his wife or daughter during his 30-second fueling pit stops. He did not smoke or drink alcohol. Father-and-son dominated the record book claiming a total of 28 records.

== Death ==
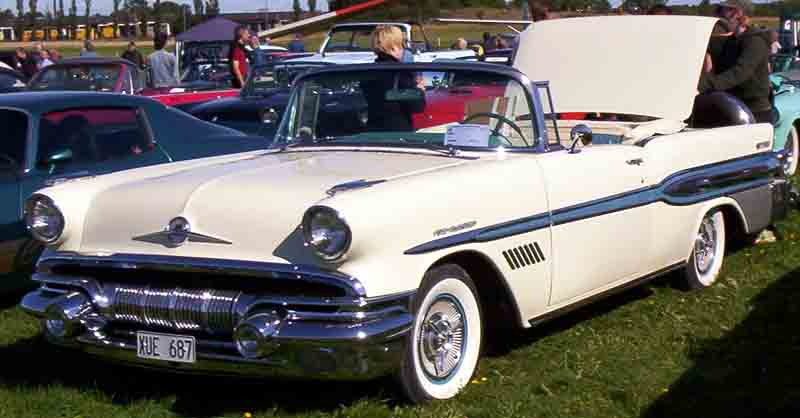
A 1957 Pontiac Bonneville, the rarest of all Pontiacs—in honour of Ab and Marv

The same year, Ab had the opportunity to drive a Pontiac pace car in Elkhart Lake, Wisconsin, at the Road America race in August of that year. Jenkins was returning from a baseball game with Pontiac executives George Bourke and Robert Emerick on August 9 when he noticed a billboard with a farm tractor on it and started telling the men about his wild ride in 1935 when he suddenly grabbed his chest and died from a heart attack.

The next year, General Motors introduced the 1957 Pontiac “Bonneville” in honor of Ab and Marv's achievements making it the first, and perhaps the only car to ever “earn” its name and not simply be “given” its name by an automaker.

Of the 630 limited production run, each dealer got only one, making it the rarest of all Pontiacs ever produced. The new Bonneville was the fastest of the division – 0 to 60 miles per hour (0 to 97 km/h) in 8.1 seconds thanks to the new fuel injected V8 that cranked out 300HP plus. All convertibles, all automatics, the car delivered loaded with options for $5,782 – approaching double that of the Star Chief Custom Convertible ($3,105) with which it shared the 124-inch-wheelbase (310 cm) chassis.

Jenkins Peak was named in his honor in 1960. The mountain is located north of the Bonneville Speedway and is prominently visible from there.

== Awards ==
Jenkins was inducted into the Motorsports Hall of Fame of America in 2023.

Political offices
| Preceded by John M. Wallace | Mayor of Salt Lake City; 1940–1944 | Succeeded by Earl J. Glade |
