= Hogup Mountains =

Mountain range in Utah

- Location within Utah

Highest point
- Peak: Tangent Peak
- Elevation: 7,047 ft (2,148 m)
- Coordinates: 41°28′50″N 113°10′28″W

Dimensions
- Length: 25 mi (40 km) N-S
- Width: 9 mi (14 km)

Geography
- Country: United States
- State: Utah
- County: Box Elder

The Hogup Mountains are a small 25-mile (40 km) long mountain range located in central Box Elder County, Utah, United States. The range lies on the northwest perimeter of the Great Salt Lake, and also lies surrounded by the Great Salt Lake Desert; it lies in the desert's northeast.

Three major peaks are found in the mountain's center, Tangent and Scorpio Peaks, and Shelter Mountain. Also, 3 mi east in the Great Salt Lake, an outlying peak is named Dolphin Island.

== Description ==
The Hogup Mountains have a central section containing the three major peaks; the mountain range narrows both northerly and southerly into the Great Salt Lake Desert, but the northeast does have another small 7 mi ridgeline that trends exactly NNW x SSE.

=== Mountain peaks ===
Broom Mountain, 4,782 feet (1,458 m), anchors the southern mountain section on the named Hogup Ridge. The central peaks are Scorpio Peak (southeast), 6,560 feet (1,999 m), and due west, Shelter Mountain, 5,964 feet (1,818 m). In the center-north lies the range highpoint, Tangent Peak, 7,047 feet (2,148 m).

== Access ==
The south of the Hogup Mountains can be accessed from Lakeside, 14 mi ESE, though this route passes through railroad private property. The north of the range can be accessed legally from Kelton; also Park Valley on Utah State Route 30.
