= Wildcat Mountain (Missouri) =

Mountain in Missouri, USA

- Location within Missouri

Highest point
- Elevation: 1760+ ft (536+ m) NGVD 29
- Coordinates: 37°34′05″N 90°45′16″W

Geography
- Location: Iron County, Missouri
- Parent range: Saint Francois Mountains
- Topo map: USGS Johnson Shut-Ins

Wildcat Mountain is a summit in Iron County, Missouri, located 1.4 miles (2.3 km) west of Taum Sauk Mountain, Missouri's highest peak. Wildcat Mountain's summit elevation is only about two feet less than that of Taum Sauk Mountain.

Wildcat Mountain was named for the wildcats in the area.
