= Pilot Range =

Mountain range in Nevada and Utah, US

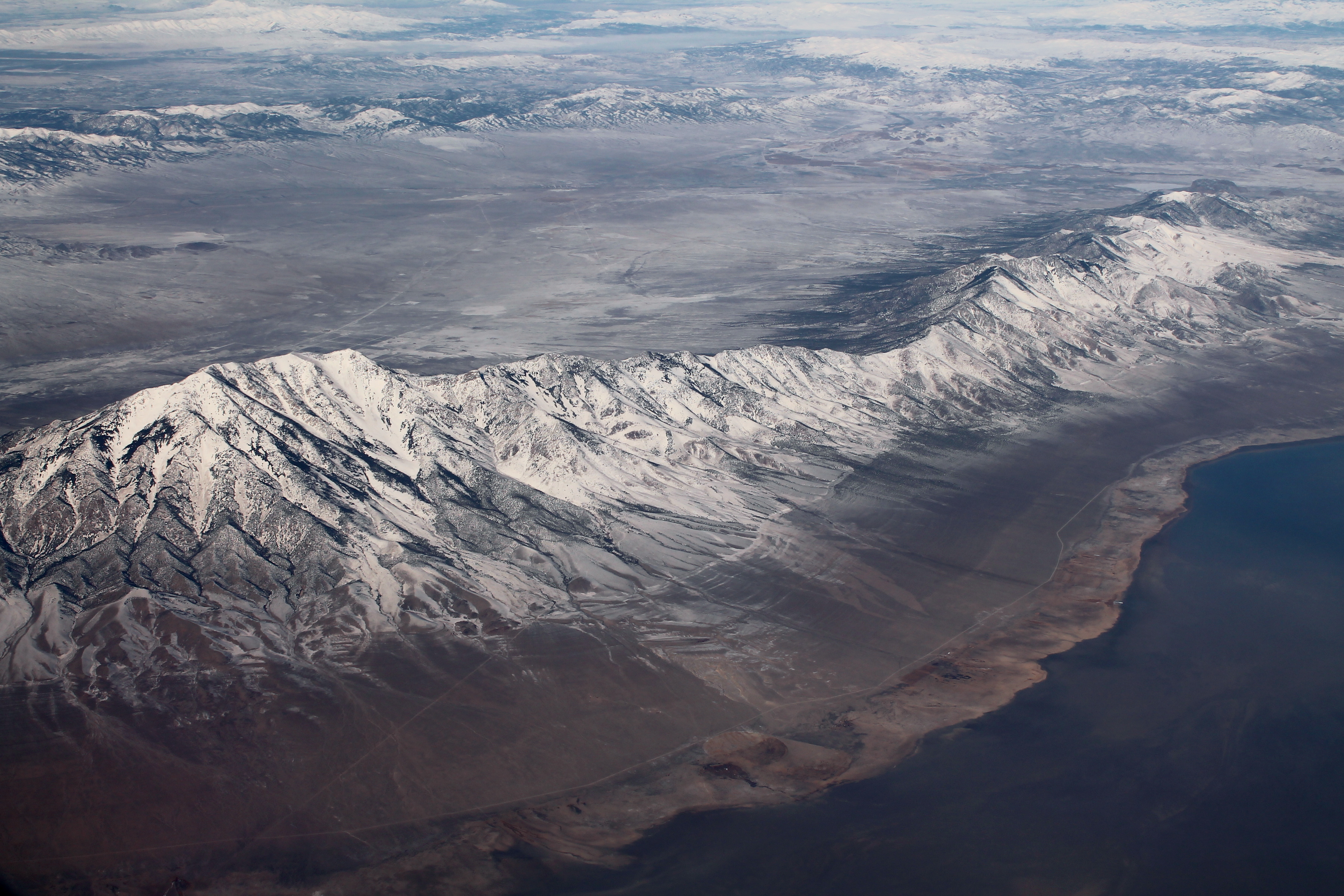
- Aerial view of Pilot Range

Highest point
- Peak: Pilot Peak
- Elevation: 10,716 ft (3,266 m)
- Coordinates: 41°01′16″N 114°04′39″W

Dimensions
- Length: 30 mi (48 km) SSW to NNE
- Width: 4 mi (6.4 km)(variable)
- Area: 80 mi^{2} (210 km^{2})

Geography
- Location within Nevada
- Country: United States
- States: Utah and Nevada
- Peaks: Copper Mountain, Bald Eagle Mountain and Rhyolite Butte
- Borders on: east: Pilot Valley Playa west: Pilot Creek Valley

The Pilot Range is a mountain range straddling the border of Box Elder County, Utah, and Elko County, Nevada, United States. Lying 50 miles west of the Great Salt Lake, the range forms part of the north-west border of the Great Salt Lake Desert. The range reaches a maximum elevation of 10,716 feet at the summit of Pilot Peak. Most of the range is public Bureau of Land Management land and thus has no access restrictions. Its principal uses are mining, livestock grazing, and seasonal elk and deer hunting.

== Description ==
The Pilot Range begins about 15 miles (24 km) north of the community of West Wendover, and continues north-northeastwards for approximately 30 miles (48 km). The abandoned railroad town of Lucin, Utah lies two miles north-east.

The range runs SSW to NNE, with various canyons spurring east and west off a prominent ridgeline. It covers an area of about 51,200 acres (20,700 ha). Elevation varies from a base of 5,000 feet (1,500 m) feet to 10,716 foot (3,266 m) Pilot Peak. Other significant summits in the range are Copper Mountain, Bald Eagle Mountain, and Rhyolite Butte.

To the east of the range lie Pilot Valley Playa and its springs; beyond that the Silver Island Mountains, and the north section of Pilot Creek Valley to the west.

Several fresh and salty springs flow from the base of the alluvial fans at the base of the range. The largest is Bettridge Creek, a habitat for the threatened Lahontan cutthroat trout. Vegetation varies from Engelmann Spruce and Limber Pine in the highest elevations, pinyon pine, mountain mahogany, and juniper in the middle elevations, sagebrush and grass in the south-face slopes and ridge-tops, and rabbitbrush, grass, and greasewood in the lower elevations. The Pilot Range cinquefoil (Potentilla cottamii) is a rare species of plant which can be found in the Pilot Range and a few other ranges nearby.
