= Wildcat Mountain (Utah) =

Mountain in the American state of Utah

Coordinates: 40°28′41″N 113°17′50″W

Wildcat Mountain is a peak in the northern part of the U.S. state of Utah. Approximately 52 miles west of Tooele and 17 miles south of I-80, the mountain is just over 5,200 feet high and once played host to a Cold War–era bombing target field at its southeastern foot.

Wildcat Mountain is the only significant promontory in the historic Wendover range, what was part of the Wendover Air Force Base. During a study in 1978, feral horses and prairie falcons were found at the site.

== Military artifacts ==
A mock airfield is visible at the southeastern end of the mountain. A main runway and a taxi way have been built including hardstands and parked aircraft. Several types of derelict aircraft are visible. These include T-37, Mig 29, Mig 21 and Phantom II aircraft. The Phantoms are on the north end of both the runway and the taxi way. They have been mostly destroyed. The whole region around this airport and extending north along the base of Wildcat Mountain shows evidence of munition impacts. There is a road which ascends northwesterly from the south end of the airport. Along this road are isolated hardstands with T-37 aircraft sitting on them. One can look over the region using satellite views on Google Earth plus Google and Bing Maps. This is a rather fascinating relic of the cold war, though it may still remain in use. Searching to the east towards Dugway there are many target areas liberally pitted with spent munitions.
