= Pilot Peak (Nevada) =

Mountain in Nevada, United States

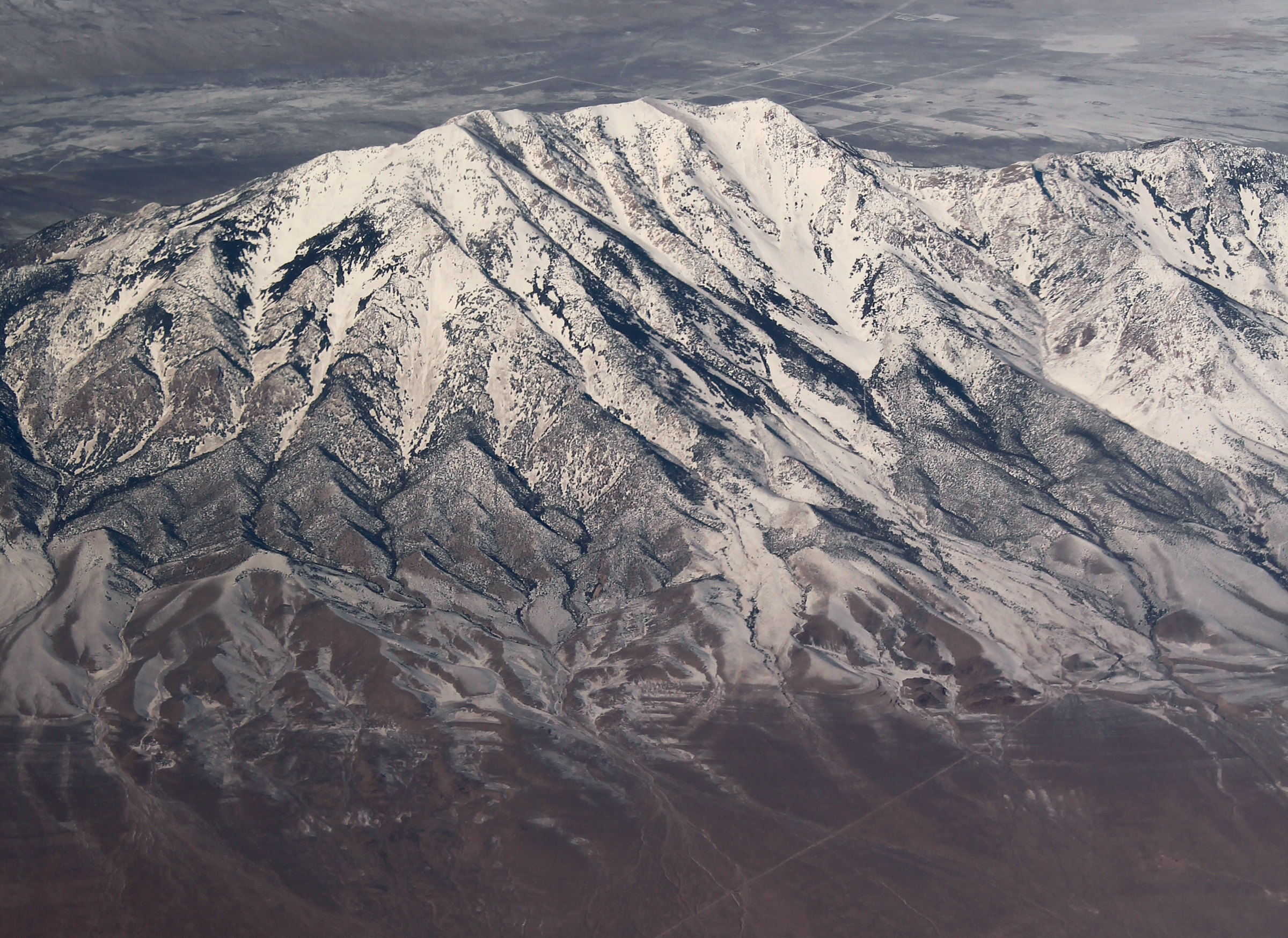
- Aerial view of Pilot Peak

Highest point
- Elevation: 10,720 ft (3,267 m)
- Prominence: 5,726 ft (1,745 m)
- Listing: US most prominent peaks 78th
- Coordinates: 41°01′16″N 114°04′39″W

Geography
- Location within Nevada
- Location: Elko County, Nevada, U.S.
- Parent range: Pilot Range
- Topo map: USGS Pilot Peak

Climbing
- Easiest route: Class 2 scramble from Miners Canyon

Nevada Historical Marker
- Reference no.: 46

Pilot Peak (Shoshoni: Waahkai) is the highest mountain in the Pilot Range in extreme eastern Elko County, Nevada, United States. It is the most topographically prominent peak in Elko County and the fourth-most prominent peak in Nevada. The peak is on public land administered by the Bureau of Land Management and thus has no access restrictions.

== History ==
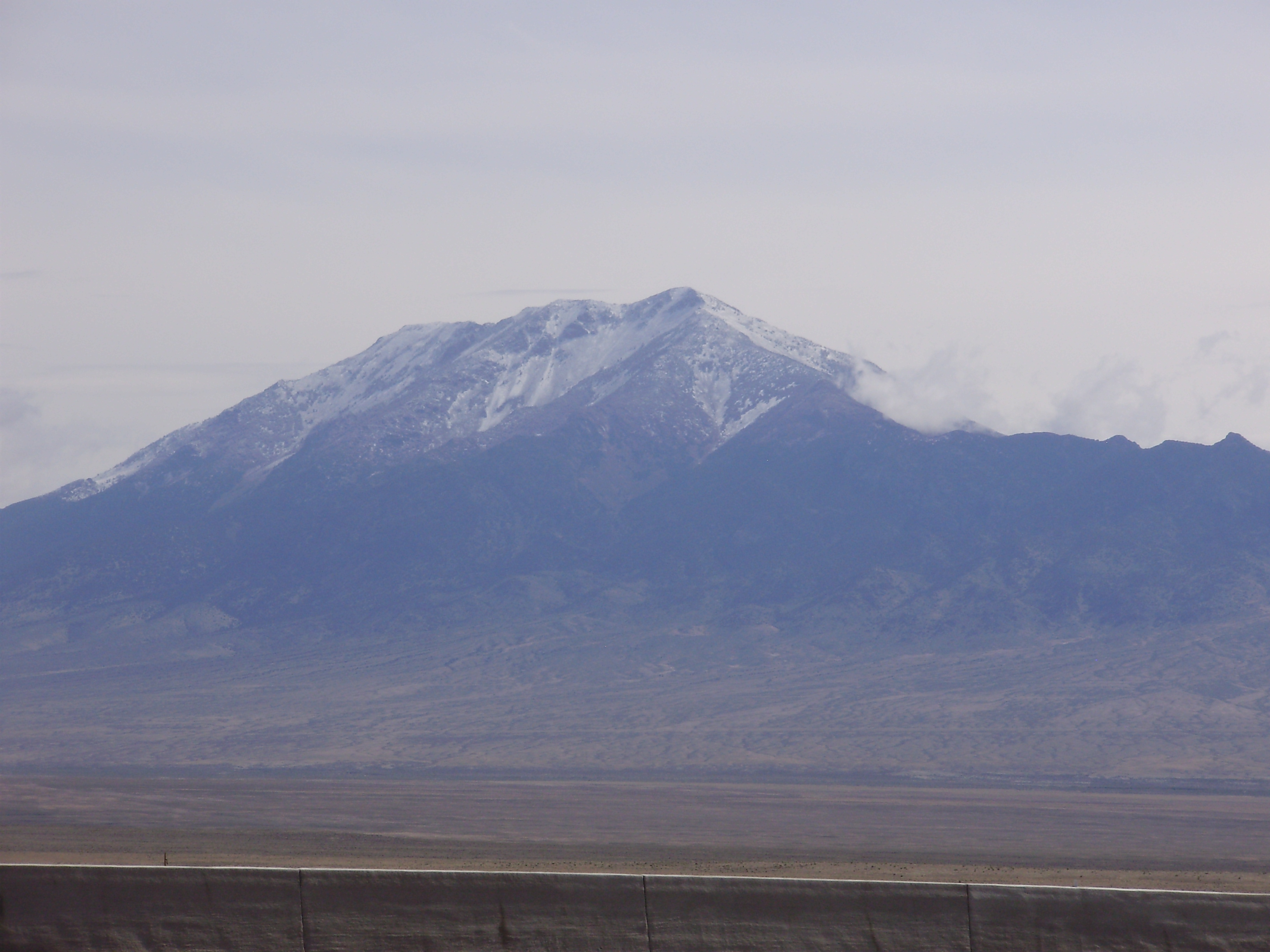
View of Pilot Peak from Interstate 80 in Nevada

Pilot Peak was named in 1845 for its use as an easily recognized landmark. John C. Fremont saw the peak from the east during his third expedition, mapping the Great Basin. Wondering whether his entire party could cross the desert he sent Kit Carson ahead to scout for water sources. Finding a perennial spring just east of the peak, Carson lit a large bonfire, the smoke from which signaled Fremont that the crossing was possible.

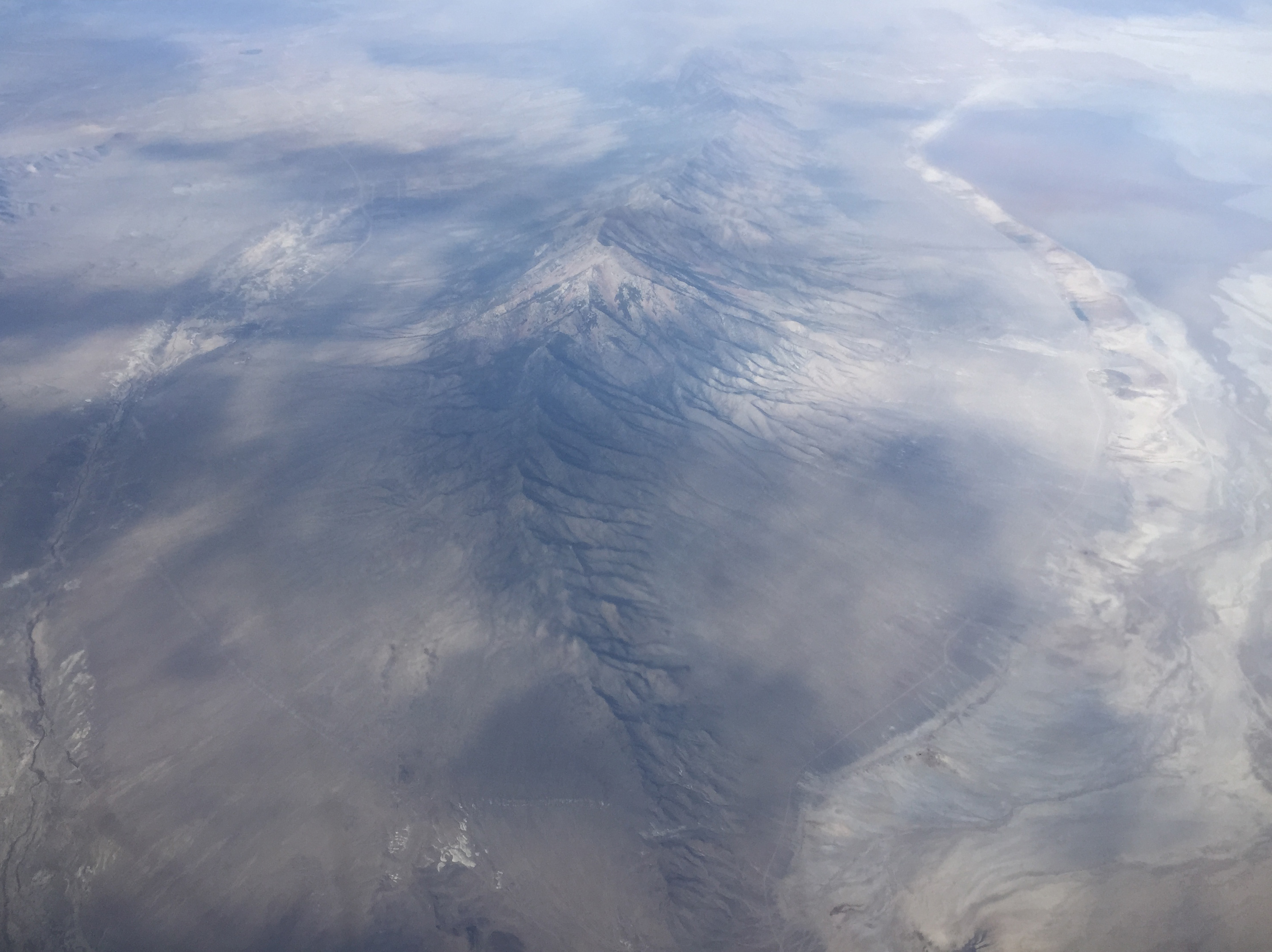
View from an airplane

In 1846 the Donner Party also used the peak as a landmark for their crossing of the Great Salt Lake Desert, part of the Hastings Cutoff emigrant route. Running out of water, they had to temporarily abandon their wagons and oxen in order to reach the springs (now called Donner Springs) at the base of the peak. They eventually recovered most of their stock animals and wagons, and continued their journey to the California Trail and the Sierra Nevada mountains.

== See also ==
- List of Ultras of the United States
