= Great Salt Lake Desert =

Large dry lake in northern Utah, United States

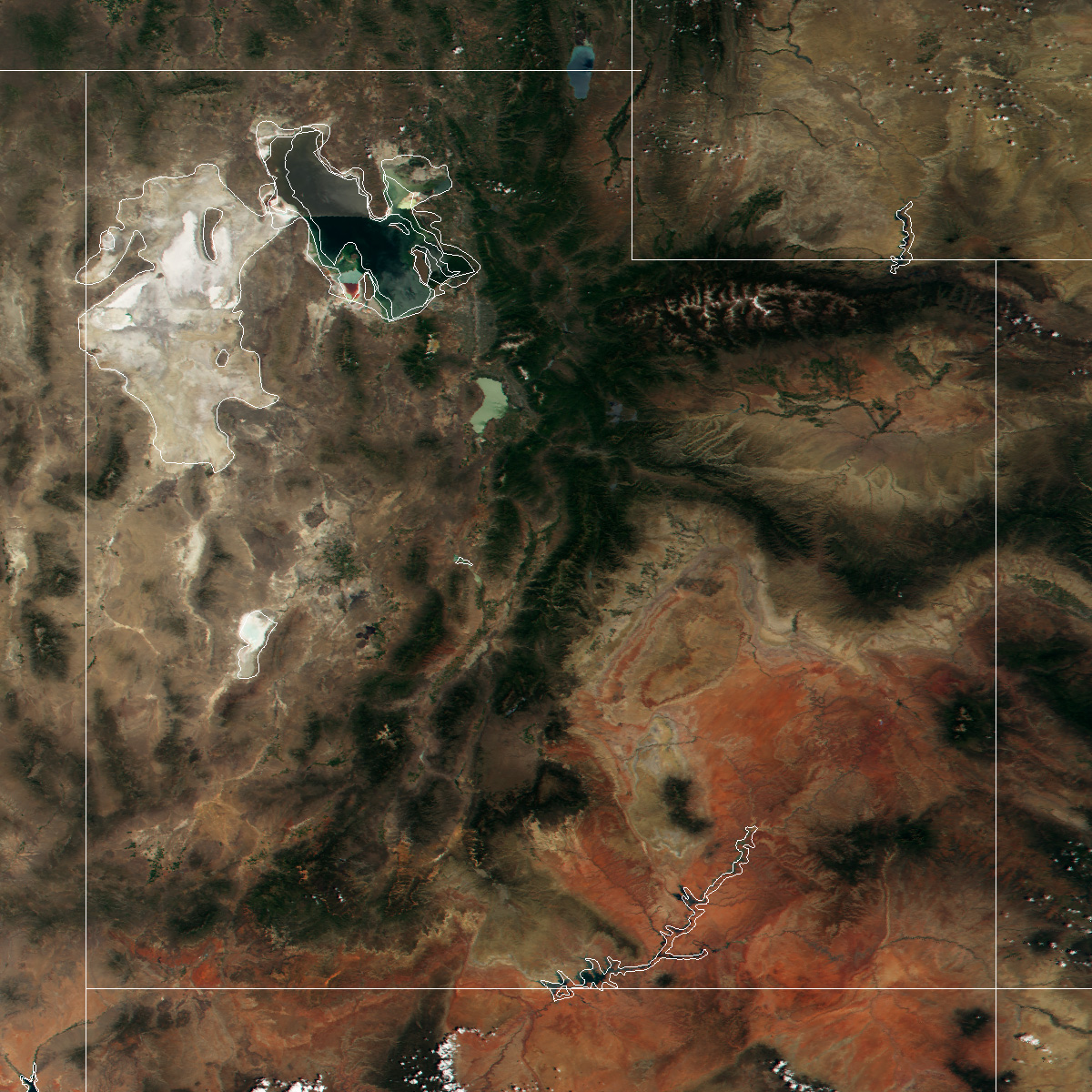
- The desert's white salt is depicted in Utah's northwest.
- Area: 4,000 mi^{2} (10,000 km^{2})

Geography
- Country: United States
- State: Utah
- County: Juab County; Tooele County
- Borders on: Cedar Mountains, Silver Island, Hogup, Newfoundland Mountains, & Lakeside Range West (NV): Pilot Range.
- Coordinates: 40.7°N 113.6°W
- Interactive map of Great Salt Lake Desert

The Great Salt Lake Desert (colloquially referred to as the West Desert) is a large dry lake in northern Utah between the Great Salt Lake and the Nevada border. It is a subregion of the larger Great Basin Desert and is noted for white evaporite Lake Bonneville salt deposits including the Bonneville Salt Flats.

== Description ==
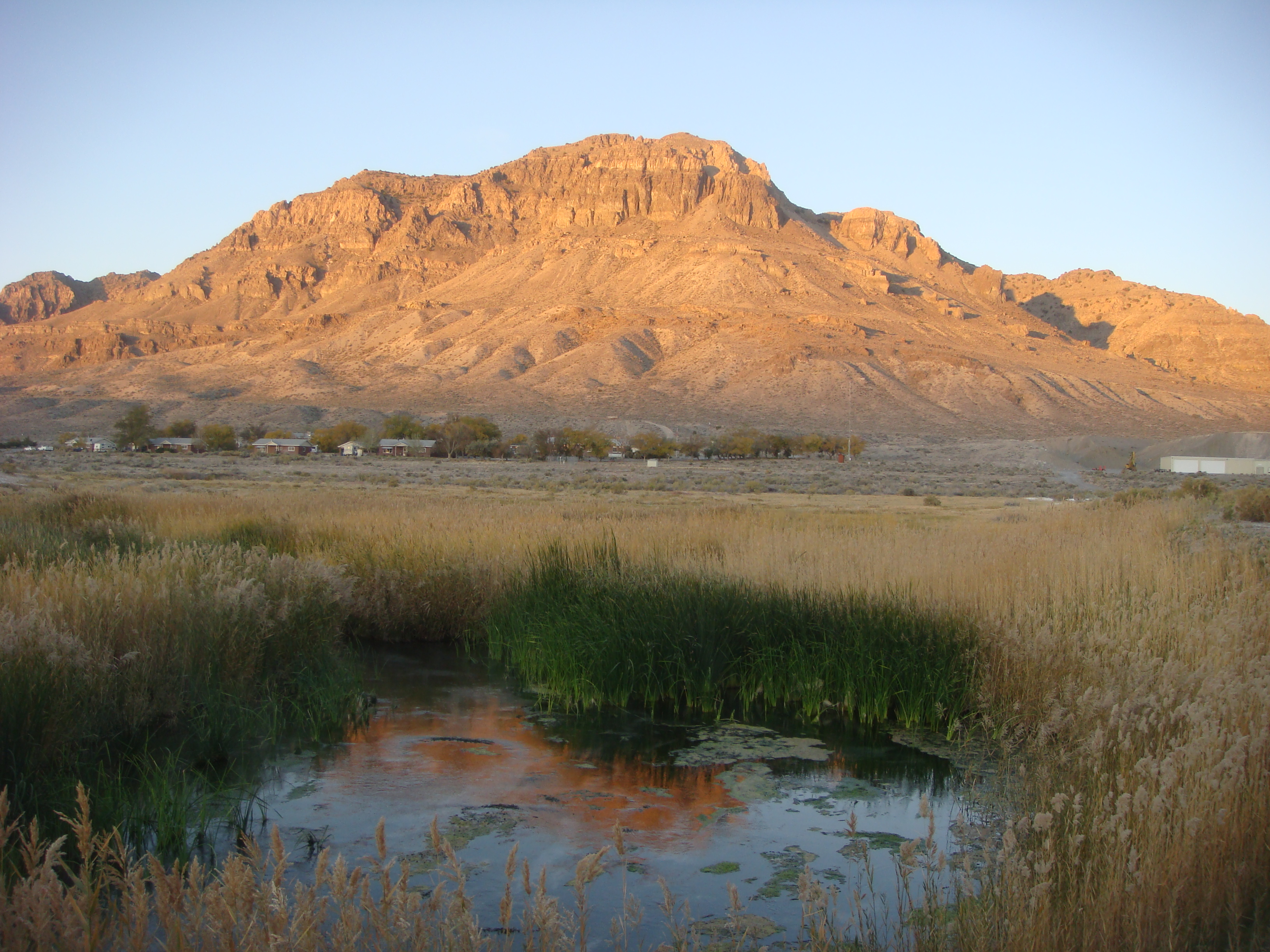
Middle Spring in the Fish Springs National Wildlife Refuge at the northeast corner of the Fish Springs Range

The desert's Wendover AFB operated from 1940 to 1986.

Several small mountain ranges occupy the edges of the desert, such as the Cedar Mountains, Lakeside Mountains, Silver Island Mountains, Hogup Mountains, Grassy Mountains, and Newfoundland Mountains. On the western edge of the desert, just across the border in Nevada, stands Pilot Peak in the Pilot Range.

The desert is cool during the winter and includes unusual plants adapted to the dry conditions. Most of the desert receives less than 8 inches (200 mm) of annual precipitation. The salt crust covering the desert reforms yearly when the rain evaporates. The military's Utah Test and Training Range is in the northern portion of the desert. The lowest part of Juab County is located just south of the Dugway Proving Grounds, about 1.5 miles (2.4 km) northwest of the northwest corner of the Fish Springs Range.

== History ==
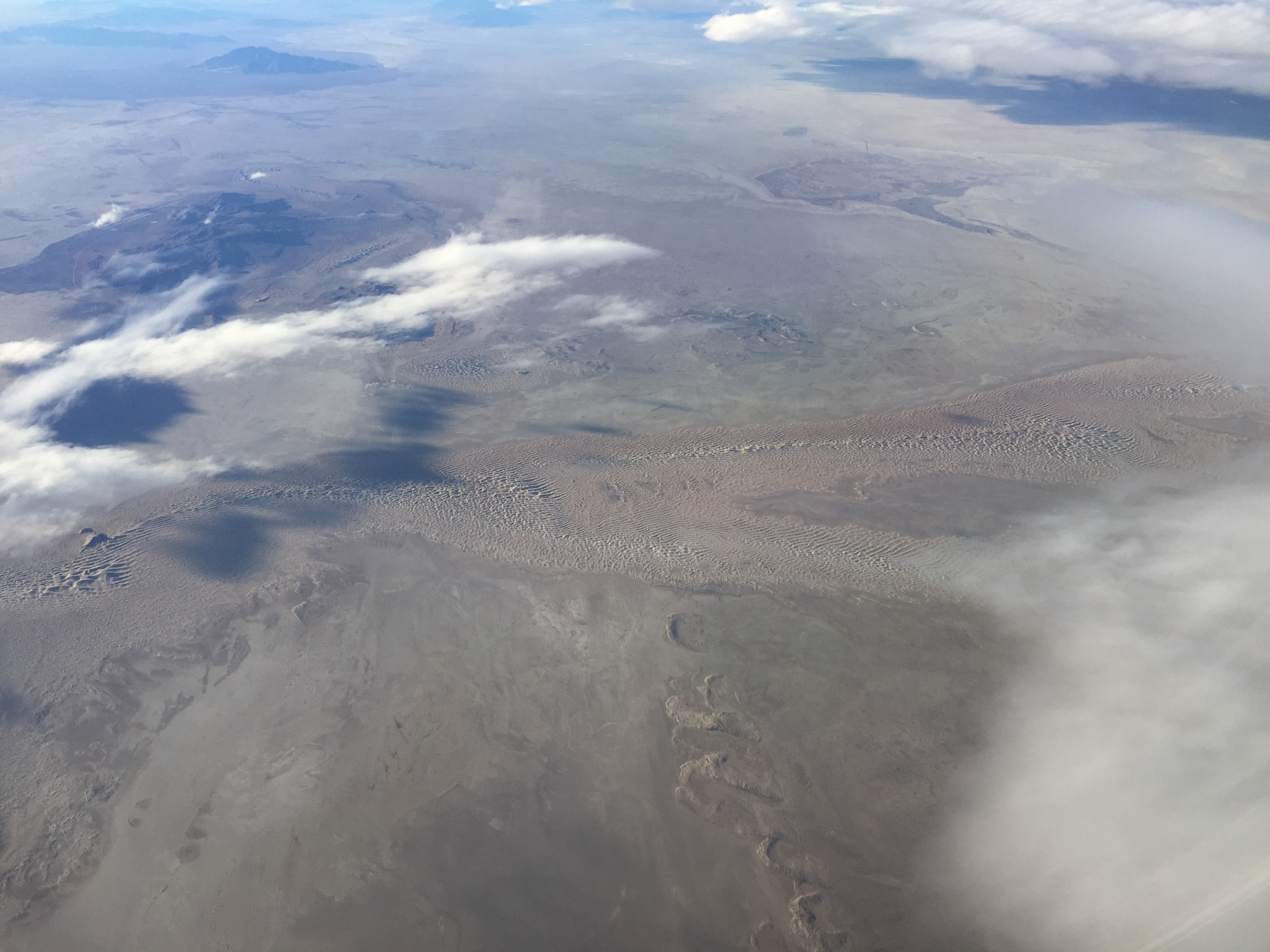
View of the desert from an airplane

During Jedediah Smith's 1826-27 expedition, Robert Evans nearly died while crossing the desert, and in the 1840s, westward emigrants used the Hastings Cutoff through 130 miles (210 km) of Great Salt Lake desert to reduce the distance to California. The 1846 Donner Party's difficulties in making the crossing contributed to their becoming snowbound in the Sierra Nevada. Howard Stansbury explored the desert in 1849. In 1956, I-80 replaced the Wendover Cut-off across the desert, including a straight east-west section for ~50 miles (80 km) between the Cedar Mountains to the east and Wendover on the Utah/Nevada border. Following a railway completed across the Bonneville Salt Flats in 1910, the flats were first used as a speedway in 1914. The world records for highest land speeds are regularly broken here.

=== Recent discoveries ===
In 2022, archaeologists using ground-penetrating radar discovered about 88 footprints that had been left behind by humans at least 12,000 years ago. In the "ghost tracks", as the archaeologists called them, the footprints absorb moisture and are only visible when it rains and disappear when dry.

== Climate ==
The Great Salt Lake Desert experiences a desert climate with hot summers and cold winters. The desert is an excellent example of a cold desert climate. The elevation, 4,250 feet above sea level, makes temperatures cooler than lower elevation deserts, such as the Mojave. The high elevation and aridity cause temperatures to drop sharply after sunset. Summer nights are comfortably cool. Winter highs are generally above freezing, and winter nights are cold, with temperatures often dropping below freezing.

Climate data for Knolls, Great Salt Lake Desert, Utah. (Elevation 4,250ft)
| Month | Jan | Feb | Mar | Apr | May | Jun | Jul | Aug | Sep | Oct | Nov | Dec | Year |
|---|---|---|---|---|---|---|---|---|---|---|---|---|---|
| Record high °F (°C) | 63 (17) | 63 (17) | 79 (26) | 87 (31) | 98 (37) | 104 (40) | 106 (41) | 103 (39) | 99 (37) | 89 (32) | 71 (22) | 66 (19) | 106 (41) |
| Mean daily maximum °F (°C) | 36.5 (2.5) | 41.4 (5.2) | 54.4 (12.4) | 62.3 (16.8) | 72.3 (22.4) | 83.5 (28.6) | 92.8 (33.8) | 90.9 (32.7) | 80.0 (26.7) | 64.3 (17.9) | 46.5 (8.1) | 36.5 (2.5) | 63.4 (17.4) |
| Mean daily minimum °F (°C) | 16.9 (−8.4) | 19.3 (−7.1) | 29.1 (−1.6) | 36.6 (2.6) | 44.9 (7.2) | 54.7 (12.6) | 62.1 (16.7) | 59.5 (15.3) | 48.0 (8.9) | 34.4 (1.3) | 23.3 (−4.8) | 14.5 (−9.7) | 37.0 (2.8) |
| Record low °F (°C) | −16 (−27) | −17 (−27) | −1 (−18) | 14 (−10) | 24 (−4) | 35 (2) | 43 (6) | 39 (4) | 25 (−4) | 8 (−13) | −3 (−19) | −25 (−32) | −25 (−32) |
| Average precipitation inches (mm) | 0.61 (15) | 0.46 (12) | 0.91 (23) | 1.01 (26) | 1.23 (31) | 0.68 (17) | 0.36 (9.1) | 0.31 (7.9) | 0.56 (14) | 0.77 (20) | 0.61 (15) | 0.38 (9.7) | 7.88 (200) |
| Average snowfall inches (cm) | 0.3 (0.76) | 0.1 (0.25) | 0 (0) | 0 (0) | 0 (0) | 0 (0) | 0 (0) | 0 (0) | 0 (0) | 0 (0) | 0 (0) | 0.1 (0.25) | 0.5 (1.3) |
Source: The Western Regional Climate Center

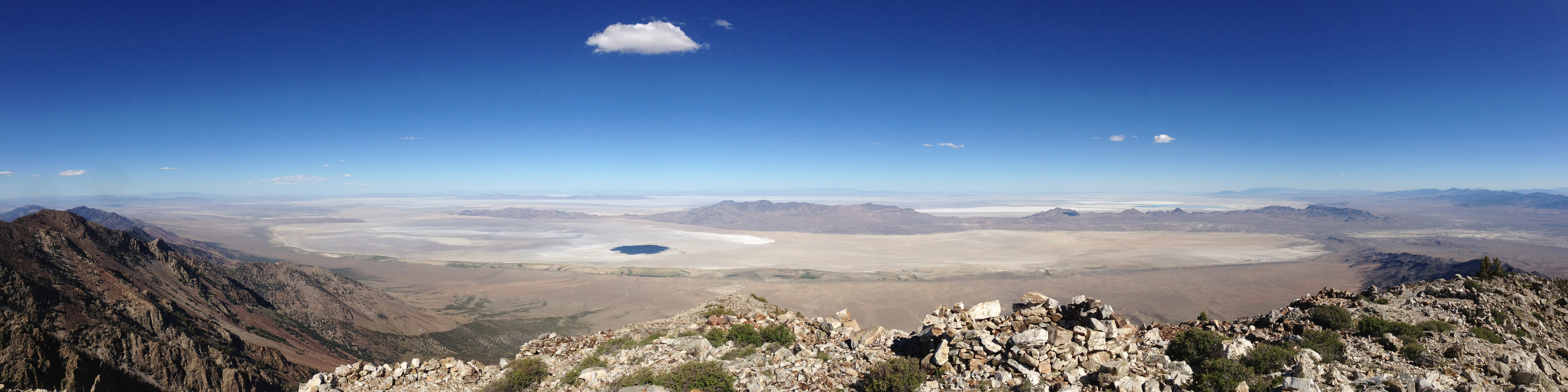
Great Salt Lake Desert as seen from Pilot Peak
