= Weimar (disambiguation) =

Weimar is a city in Thuringia, Germany.

Weimar may also refer to:

== People ==
- Bjarne Weimar Danish silversmith; whose father Evald Nielsen, also a silversmith, was a contemporary and peer of Georg Jensen
- Jacintha Weimar (born 1998), Dutch football goalkeeper
- Robert Weimar (1932–2013), German legal scholar and psychologist

== Places ==
- Weimar (Lahn), a town in Hesse, Germany
- Weimar, California, United States
- Weimar, Texas, United States

== Other uses ==
- Weimar Republic, unofficial name of the German Reich from 1918 to 1933

== See also ==
- Weimar Triangle, a diplomatic group consisting of Germany, France, and Poland
- Weimar Institute of Health & Education, an independent Seventh-day Adventist facility
- Classical Weimar (World Heritage Site), a UNESCO World Heritage Site
- Ahnatal-Weimar, a district of Ahnatal, Hesse, Germany
- Weimer (disambiguation)
