= Weimer =

Weimer may refer to:

- Weimer, former name of Weimar, California
- Weimer Township, Jackson County, Minnesota
- Weimer Township, Barnes County, North Dakota

== People with the surname ==
- Chuck Weimer (1904-1990), American football player
- Jake Weimer (1873-1928), American baseball player
- John Weimer, multiple people
- Katherine Weimer (1919-2000), American physicist
- Ludwig Weimer (born 1940), German theologian
- Maria Weimer (1979-2024), Swedish diplomat and politician
- Michael Weimer (born c. 1971), American US Army Sergeant Major
- Paul K. Weimer (1914-2005), American television developer
- Theodor Weimer (born 1959), German manager and CEO of Deutsche Börse AG
- Tiffany Weimer (born 1983), American soccer player
- Wolfram Weimer (born 1964), German publisher and journalist, German Federal Government Commissioner for Culture and the Media (since 2025)
