= Route of the Lincoln Highway =

As the Lincoln Highway was one of the earliest transcontinental highways for automobiles across the United States and was widely publicized since its inception, the route of the Lincoln Highway was determined not only by civil engineering considerations but also by politics. In many regions, there was general consensus among those who had power or interest in influencing the route. But in a few regions the choice of route was a contentious topic during the 1920s. The highway took the following route:

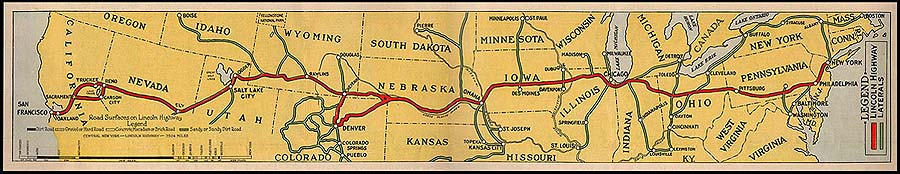

== New York ==
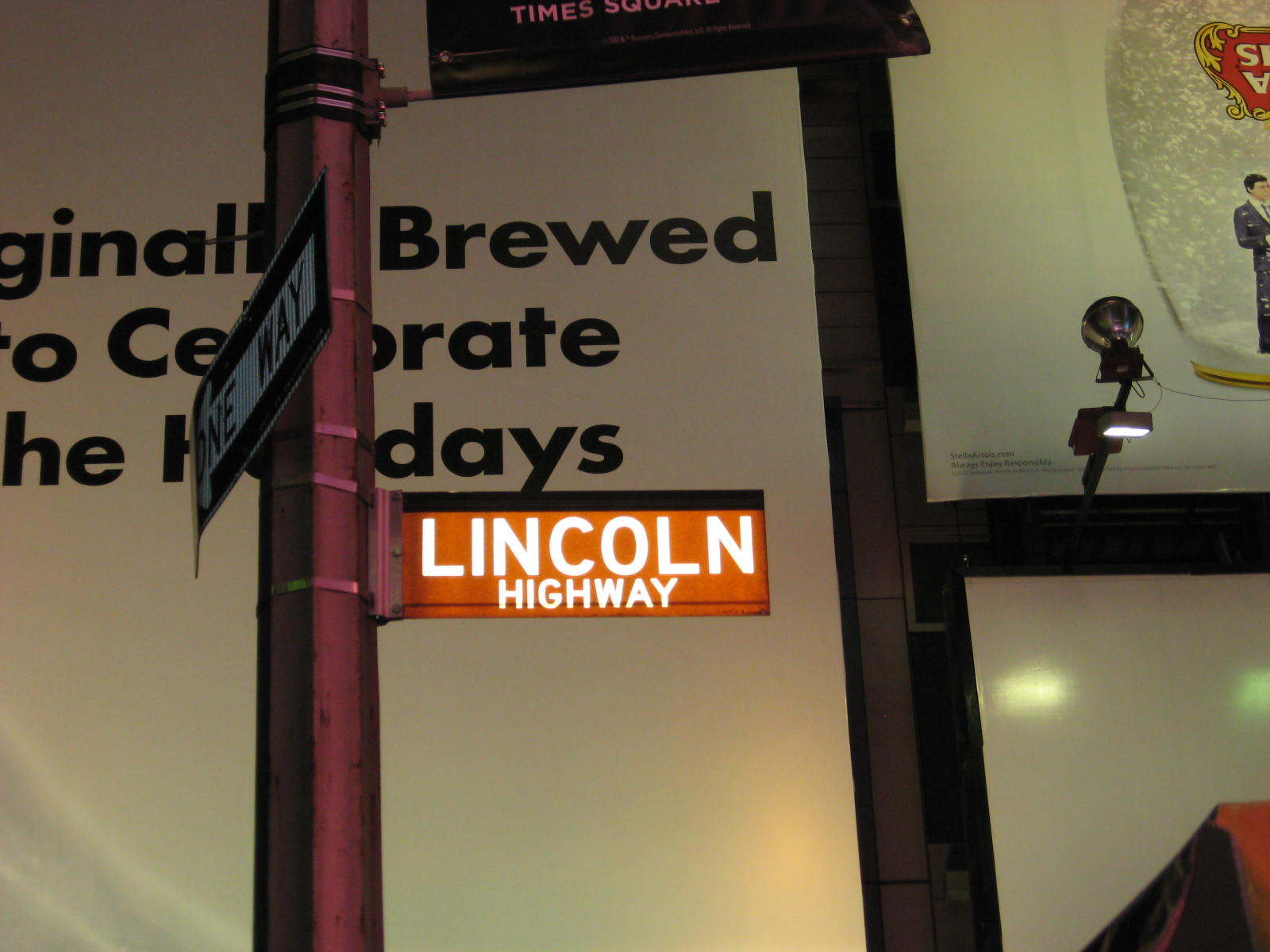
Sign marking the eastern terminus of the Lincoln Highway at the intersection of 42nd Street and Broadway in Times Square, New York

The very short Lincoln Highway section in New York went west from Times Square on 42nd Street to the Weehawken Ferry. It was realigned down Broadway from which it turned right and passed through the Holland Tunnel after it opened in 1927.

== New Jersey ==
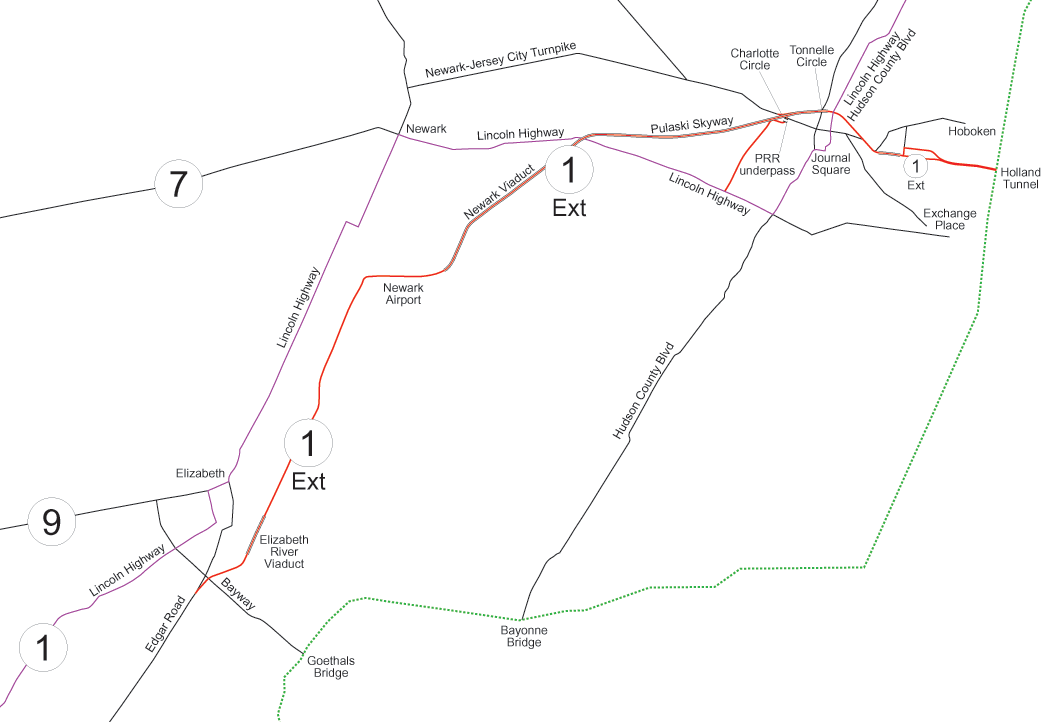
In Jersey City, Newark, and Elizabeth

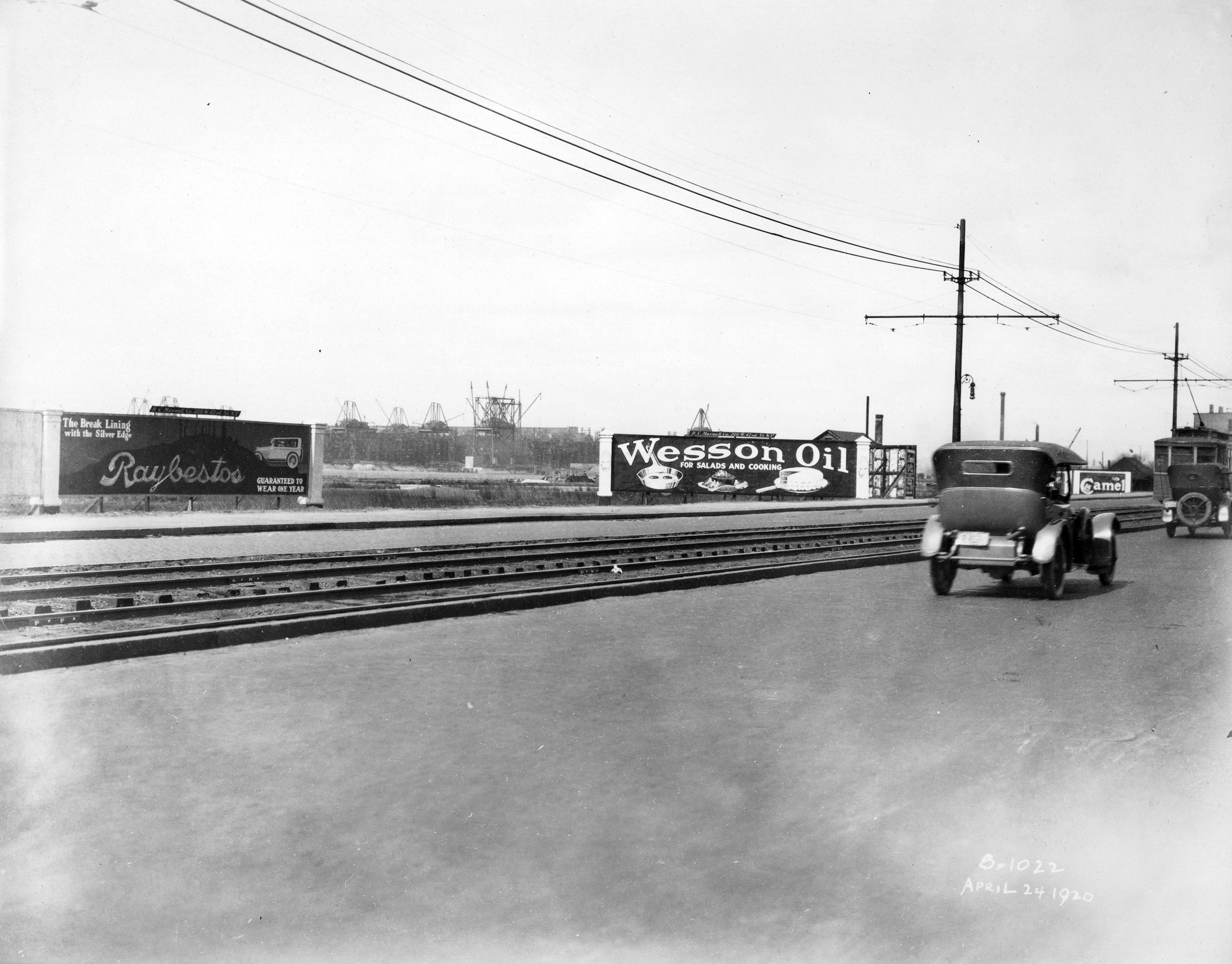
Approaching Hackensack River along Newark Plank Road

The original route of Lincoln Highway came off the New York Central Railroad's ferry at Weehawken Terminal and climbed the Palisades on Pershing Road. At the top it went west on 5th Street (now 49th Street) to the Hudson County Boulevard (now John F. Kennedy Boulevard) on which it travelled south to Communipaw Avenue in Jersey City. After the opening of the Holland Tunnel and part of the Route 1 Extension, the Lincoln Highway travelled along the upper level of what is known as State Highway to the Boulevard.

Veering west it crossed the Hackensack River via the Lincoln Highway Bridge and traveled on what is now U.S. Route 1-9 Truck through Kearny Point, where the road is still known as Lincoln Highway. Some sources indicate the Highway bypassing the corner of Hudson County Boulevard and Communipaw Avenue by passing through Lincoln Park, which had been the route of Newark Plank Road.

Crossing the Passaic River, the Highway entered the Ironbound district of Newark along Ferry Street and Market Street, now the eastbound side of a one-way pair with Raymond Boulevard. In downtown Newark at Four Corners, it turned south on Broad Street, at what was claimed to be the "third busiest traffic center in the United States". By 1924 this had been bypassed using Jackson and Lafayette Streets. From Broad Street, the Highway cut over to Frelinghuysen Avenue, possibly on Clinton Avenue or Poinier Street, or via Elizabeth Avenue and Meeker Avenue.

After construction of the Holland Tunnel the ferry portion was abandoned and traffic travelled over Bergen Hill to connect with Hudson Boulevard. A reroute in 1928 took the Lincoln Highway onto the new Route 1 Extension (now U.S. Route 1/9) from east of downtown Newark to North Avenue in Elizabeth, and west on North Avenue back to the old road. The Highway was also moved to the new Holland Tunnel and approach east of the Hudson County Boulevard (now Route 139). By then the U.S. Highway System was marked, and the Lincoln Highway was fading in importance.

From the corner of Frelinghuysen Avenue and Poinier Street in Newark to Brunswick Circle in Trenton, the Lincoln Highway followed today's Route 27 and U.S. Route 206. Many parts are still known as Lincoln Highway. The only changes have been the following:

- The original road may have followed Clinton Avenue to Elizabeth Avenue in Newark and North Broad Street in Elizabeth.
- Route 27 now has a one-way pair in Elizabeth. The northbound side, on Cherry Street, is the old Lincoln Highway.
- In 1919, the New Jersey State Highway Commission built a new road on the west side of the Pennsylvania Railroad (now the Northeast Corridor) from near the northeast of Dow Avenue between Colonia and Iselin to Cedar Street in Menlo Park, to avoid two railroad crossings. The old road is now Middlesex-Essex Turnpike and Thornall Street, on the east side of the tracks. A 1905 map shows the main road using Thornall Street all the way to its end at Evergreen Road and crossing the tracks there, with the road on the west side existing north to Cedar Street as a stub; this may have changed between then and 1919. However, until 1919, the main road used Colonia Boulevard, New Dover Road and Middlesex Avenue to get from Rahway to Green Street.
- Until 1919, the main road was what is now named Old Road, lying east of the current road north of Kingston.
- The old bridge over the Millstone River at Kingston still exists, south of the current bridge (built in 1969).

The Lincoln Highway entered Trenton along Brunswick Avenue, now northbound US 206 and BUS US 1. Until 1920 the Highway used the Calhoun Street Bridge over the Delaware River into Pennsylvania; a 1920 map indicates that it probably used Warren Street (now southbound US 206 and BUS US 1) and West State Street to reach the bridge. In 1920 the Highway was moved from the tolled Calhoun Street Bridge to the free Bridge Street Bridge. To get there it probably continued south on Warren Street, turning west on Bridge Street to the bridge. This path is now followed by southbound BUS US 1, with a realignment from Assunpink Creek to the bridge due to redevelopment.

In 1916, the Lincoln Highway was designated the following State Highway numbers:

- Route 1 (Later Renumbered to Route 25) from Elizabeth to New Brunswick
- Route 13 (Present Route 27) from New Brunswick to Trenton

The Highway in Trenton, and in and north of Elizabeth, did not receive a number.

In 1927, the whole Lincoln Highway in New Jersey was assigned the number U.S. Route 1, though that number was soon moved to newer bypasses.

The Route 1 Extension, built in the late 1920s, was considered a bypass of the Lincoln Highway, but the old road has continued to be known as the Lincoln Highway, except possibly between Communipaw Avenue and Tonnelle Circle in Jersey City, where the name may have moved to the new road (now TRUCK US 1–9).

== Pennsylvania ==
The path of the Lincoln Highway was first laid out in September 1913; it was defined to run through Canton, Ohio, Beaver Falls, Pittsburgh, Greensburg, Ligonier, Bedford, Chambersburg, Gettysburg, York, Lancaster and Philadelphia, Pennsylvania, and Camden, New Jersey. This bypassed Harrisburg to the south, and thus did not use the older main route across the state between Chambersburg and Lancaster. From Pittsburgh to Philadelphia, this incorporated a number of old turnpikes, some of which still collected tolls.

This original 1913 path of the Lincoln Highway continued east from Philadelphia, crossing the Delaware River to Camden, New Jersey on the Market Street Ferry. By 1915, Camden was dropped from the route, allowing the highway to cross the Delaware on a bridge at Trenton (initially the Calhoun Street Bridge, later the Bridge Street Bridge).

In 1924, the entire Lincoln Highway in Pennsylvania was designated Pennsylvania Route 1. In late 1926 the route from West Virginia to Philadelphia (using the new route west of Pittsburgh) was assigned U.S. Route 30, while the rest of the Lincoln Highway and PA 1 became part of U.S. Route 1.

== West Virginia ==
The Lincoln Highway did not enter West Virginia until 1927, when it was rerouted between Pittsburgh, Pennsylvania and East Liverpool, Ohio. The piece in West Virginia ran roughly along present U.S. Route 30, splitting onto the old route at Chester. There it turned southwest on Carolina Avenue (West Virginia Route 2) before turning northwest on 3rd Street, southwest on Virginia Avenue and north on 1st Street to cross the Ohio River into East Liverpool on the 1897 Chester Bridge. The only realignment before the bridge was demolished in 1970 was in 1938, when US 30 was moved to take Carolina Avenue directly to 1st Street after a new bridge opened over the railroad. Until the current US 30 was finished in 1977, US 30 continued along Carolina Avenue to the Newell Bridge in Newell.

== Ohio ==
The routing through Ohio followed modern US Route 30 to Canton, then west on State Route 172 through Massillon to Dalton (where it rejoins US Route 30). West of Wooster it turns northwest on U.S. Route 250 to Ashland, then southwest on Clairmont Avenue which eventually becomes modern U.S. Route 42 to Mansfield. West Fourth Street to US Route 30 which it followed to Bucyrus (temporarily leaving US 30 to follow Mansfield Street and Lincoln Highway), then continued to Upper Sandusky (went through on Wyandot Avenue to County Route 330). It is a combination of US Route 30 and local roads (mainly former alignments of US 30) to the Indiana state line.

== Indiana ==
The Lincoln Highway entered Indiana on current US Route 30 to Fort Wayne. It turned northwest on modern U.S. Route 33 to Elkhart. It turned west on Lincoln Way through South Bend to U.S. Route 20. It followed US Route 20 to Rolling Prairie and continued on State Road 2 to Valparaiso where it rejoined US Route 30 to the Illinois state line.

In time, the route was shortened, following U.S. Route 30 through the entire state. Many cities along U.S. 30, including Warsaw, Plymouth, Merrillville and Schererville contain stretches of the Lincoln Highway (usually marked as "Old Lincoln Highway", "Lincolnway", "Joliet St" or "Joliet Rd") while modern U.S. 30 runs just outside the cities.

== Illinois ==
The route through Illinois was chosen to deliberately avoid Chicago, instead providing "feeder routes" to the city. The main feeder routes included Illinois Route 1 at Chicago Heights, Illinois Route 4 (later U.S. Route 66) at Joliet, and Illinois Route 38 at Geneva.

The Lincoln Highway entered Illinois on U.S. Route 30, which it followed to Aurora where it became Illinois Route 31, which it followed to Illinois Route 38 at Geneva where it turned west to Dixon. From Dixon, it continued west on Illinois Route 2 to Sterling where it rejoins U.S. Route 30. It followed U.S. Route 30 to just east of the Iowa state line, where it turned slightly northwest of Illinois Route 136.

Lincoln Highway enters Illinois on the eastern border in Sauk Village, as Joliet Street in Dyer separates from being one Native American trail into two separate paths: the current route of Lincoln Highway turns north to cross Ford Heights and Chicago Heights at 14th Street, and the original route following Sauk Trail to South Chicago Heights before turning north on Chicago Road. Chicago Road in Chicago Heights is also Dixie Highway, leading to a major intersection of Carl Fisher's two major auto trails.

Continuing west, Lincoln Highway crosses Olympia Fields (211th Street), Matteson, Frankfort, and New Lenox (Maple Street) before its next major directional change in Joliet. In Joliet, Cass Street is the original path, but when several roads were redesigned as one-way streets, a loop was added to include Jefferson Street (US-52), Center Street and Collins Street (Archer Avenue, IL-171). Lincoln Highway also crosses Chicago Street, part of the alternate route of Route 66. After crossing the Des Plaines River, US30 travels northwest and is known as Plainfield Road. It crosses Crest Hill before entering Plainfield. The route originally changes direction to west on Lockport Street, through downtown Plainfield, then north on Wallin Drive, stepping north and west every few blocks towards Aurora. It presently follows Division Street north before a more direct diagonal path.

When originally designed, Lincoln Highway crossed the Fox River near downtown at Benton Street and Downer Place, following Lake Street (IL-31) to Geneva, where the road shifted to leave the Chicago area and extend west towards the Iowa border. Presently, Lincoln Highway never enters Aurora as it crosses Montgomery as Baseline Road. At the intersection of IL-47, it travels north to Sugar Grove before turning west towards the Iowa border.

== Iowa ==
The Lincoln Highway entered Iowa on the Lyons-Fulton bridge, since torn down, north of the present-day Iowa Highway 136 bridge. It then went south on Second Street in Clinton along what is now U.S. Route 67. From there, it generally followed these present-day roads:

- U.S. Route 30 from Clinton to Lisbon, including some roads known today as "Old Highway 30"
- Local roads and city streets from Lisbon to Marion and later Cedar Rapids, rejoining present-day 30 on the southwest side of Cedar Rapids
- U.S. 30 from there to northeast of Belle Plaine, where it turned south and followed County Roads V40 and E66 through Chelsea and rejoined 30 east of Tama. The famous bridge is just west of where 30 and the Lincoln Highway currently separate.
- Local streets in Tama and County Road E49, rejoining 30 near Le Grand
- U.S. 30 to four miles (6 km) west of Le Grand, where it followed city streets through Marshalltown and left town on Lincoln Way
- County Road E41 from west of Marshalltown which passes through State Center, then runs west crossing U.S. Route 65 at Colo and continues onto Nevada. The Nevada Lincoln Highway Committee has hosted for the past 25 years an annual celebration called Lincoln Highway Days. The route continues on "Old 30" to Ames, about a mile north of "New 30", going along the south and west sides of Iowa State University.
- Gravel roads to Iowa Highway 17, where it again followed County Road E41 through Boone to Ogden
- U.S. 30 from Ogden to Grand Junction, County Road E53 through Greene County, and north through Scranton, then west to near Ralston
- From there it generally followed U.S. 30 to the Missouri Valley, where it turned south to Council Bluffs on County Road L20. It crossed the Missouri River to Omaha, Nebraska via Broadway and the Ak-Sar-Ben Bridge

== Nebraska ==
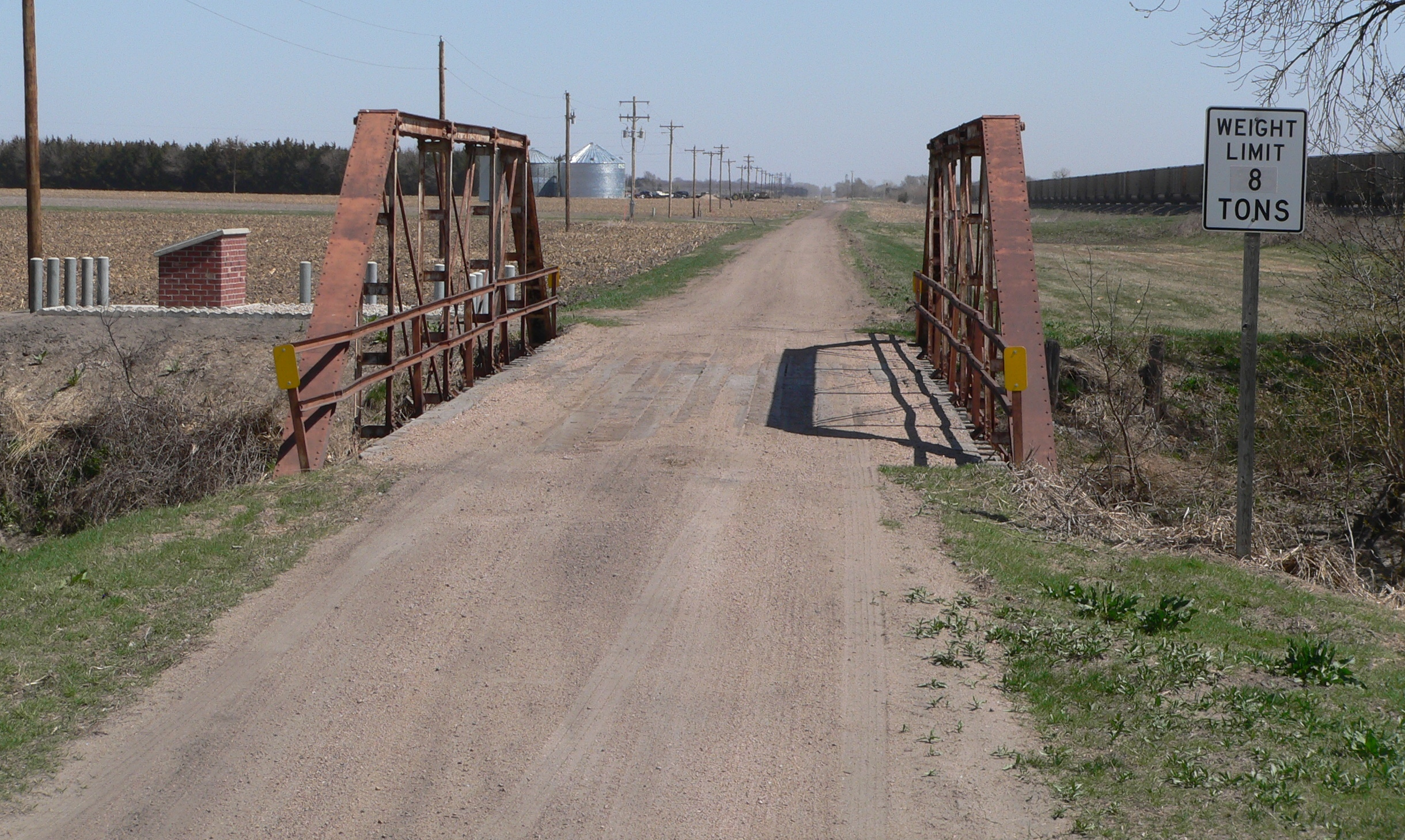
The Lincoln Highway crossed Prairie Creek in southwestern Platte County, Nebraska on this bridge. This is part of a 1.2-mile (2.0 km) section of the highway that is listed in the National Register of Historic Places.

Traveling westward from the Douglas Street Bridge. West to 18th or 24th Street depending on year. South to Farnam Street. West to 40th where it turned North to Dodge Street, Dodge to 78th and North to Cass/West Dodge Road. The Lincoln Highway in Omaha went by several landmarks, including The Blackstone Hotel, John Sutters Mill (1847) with the oldest billboard on The Lincoln Highway (1913-1930), Highway 30 (1930-1969 until the Douglas Street/AK-SAR-BEN Bridge was torn down) and Highway 6 (which meets in Council Bluffs and says good-bye at Saddle Creek and Dodge to go under The Saddle Creek Bridge South to Center Street), The Tower Gas Station and campgrounds at 78th and Dodge and Peony Park at 78th and Cass St./West Dodge Road. The longest stretch of original Lincoln Highway brick roadway in the country is in Omaha from approx. 174th to approx 203rd. The best way to access is at 180th and Dodge St. and travel North. Leaving the city it took city streets through Waterloo where it joined U.S. Route 275 to Fremont. From Fremont, it continued west on U.S. Route 30 through Central City, Grand Island, Wood River, Kearney, Lexington, Cozad, Gothenburg, North Platte, Sutherland, Ogallala, Chappell, Sidney, and Kimball to the Wyoming state line.

== Colorado ==
The 1913 proclamation included a loop through Denver, Colorado, touching the main route at Big Springs, Nebraska and Cheyenne, Wyoming. This loop was included, as Colorado had felt betrayed by the decision not to run through it after supporting the Hoosier Tour earlier that year. The loop was quietly dropped in 1915, but Colorado continued to promote the loop, including a billboard at the Big Springs end. The route is now paralleled by Interstate 76 and Interstate 25; it became the following in 1926:

- U.S. Route 138, Big Springs to Sterling, Colorado
- U.S. Route 38 (now U.S. Route 6), Sterling to Wiggins, Colorado
- unnumbered (State Highway 52 and State Highway 79?), Wiggins to Bennett, Colorado
- U.S. Route 40, Bennett to Denver
- U.S. Route 287, Denver, Lafayette, Longmont, Loveland, Fort Collins to Cheyenne, Wyoming. US 287 was not created until 1935, so the Lincoln Highway may well have used a portion of:
- Unnumbered (State Highway 1), Fort Collins to Cheyenne. Today this highway does not run north out of Ft. Collins, but it may well have in 1915 or so, perhaps having been absorbed in the "new" US 287 (which does not enter Wyoming at Cheyenne, but rather at Laramie).

== Wyoming ==
The Lincoln Highway entered Wyoming east of Pine Bluffs. It followed county roads through Egbert and Hillsdale to Archer where it rejoined US Route 30. It followed US Route 30 (now largely Interstate 80) through Cheyenne, Laramie, Medicine Bow, and Rawlins to Granger Junction. From there, it followed former U.S. Route 30S and U.S. Route 530 (now Interstate 80) through Fort Bridger and Evanston to the Utah state line. At places, the road itself is now Business I-80 in Lyman and follows frontage roads in many places.

== Utah ==
The Lincoln Highway entered Utah on modern Interstate 80 to Echo Junction where it joined I-84 and followed the Weber River to Ogden. In Ogden, it turned south to Salt Lake City.

In western Utah, the original chosen alignment headed west from Salt Lake City to Timpie in order to run around the north side of the Stansbury Mountains, largely along present State Route 171 and State Route 138. From Timpie it turned south roughly along present State Route 196, past Iosepa, to Orr's Ranch (40.306334°N 112.734897°W). Orr's Ranch is now a bit north of the east gate of the Dugway Proving Ground).

Between Orr's Ranch and the north edge of the Dugway Range, the original highway ran through the current Dugway Proving Ground around the north side of the Dugway Range (40.037°N 113.223°W). From there it headed south to the Black Rock Hills, joining the old Pony Express route there (39.880°N 113.254°W). The Lincoln Highway then went west past Fish Springs (39.848°N 113.411°W) and Callao (39.898°N 113.709°W) and across the Deep Creek Range through the Overland Canyon (40.067°N 113.829°W) to Ibapah (40.036°N 113.983°W), crossing into Nevada soon after. This route is now known by the names of Simpson Springs-Callao Road, Pony Express Road, Overland Canyon Road, Lower Goldhill Road, Ibapah Road and Willow Road.

Around 1919 a new route, known as the Goodyear Cutoff, and named after Goodyear Tire and Rubber, a major donor to the project, was built across desert that is now largely the Dugway Proving Ground. Around the same time, a realignment was made further east. Thus the new route split from the old at Mills Junction and ran south on present State Route 36 through Tooele and Stockton to St. John, where it turned west on present State Route 199 and Redding Road, crossing the Stansbury Mountains at Fisher Pass, also known as Johnson's Pass. At Orr's Ranch it rejoined the old road west to County Well (now the Dog Area of the Dugway Proving Ground), where the Goodyear Cutoff began.

The Goodyear Cutoff cut largely across the Great Salt Lake Desert, hitting high areas at Granite Mountain (40.174°N 113.296°W) and Black Point (40.085°N 113.668°W), and then passing through the Deep Creek Mountains via Gold Hill (40.166°N 113.831°W) and rejoining the older route about halfway from Gold Hill to Ibapah (40.105°N 113.864°W).

However, Utah did not care much for the Lincoln Highway, instead preferring the Victory Highway via Wendover (present Interstate 80). Nevada and northern California also favored that route, northern California because it would assure that travelers did not take the Midland Trail to Los Angeles, and so the federal aid route chosen under the Federal Aid Highway Act of 1921 (Phipps Act) was the Victory Highway, separate from the Lincoln Highway between Mills Junction, Tooele County, Utah and Wadsworth, Nevada.

Thus the Goodyear Cutoff was never paved, and was closed to the public in the 1940s when the Dugway Proving Ground was formed. In late 1926 the system of United States Numbered Highways was assigned, and U.S. Route 40 was assigned to the Victory Highway through western Utah. The next year the Lincoln Highway was rerouted to use the Wendover route, turning south on an unnumbered route (numbered U.S. Route 50 ca. 1929 and now U.S. Route 93 Alternate and U.S. Route 93) at West Wendover, Nevada and rejoining the old route at Schellbourne before turning west on U.S. Route 50 at Ely.

== Nevada ==
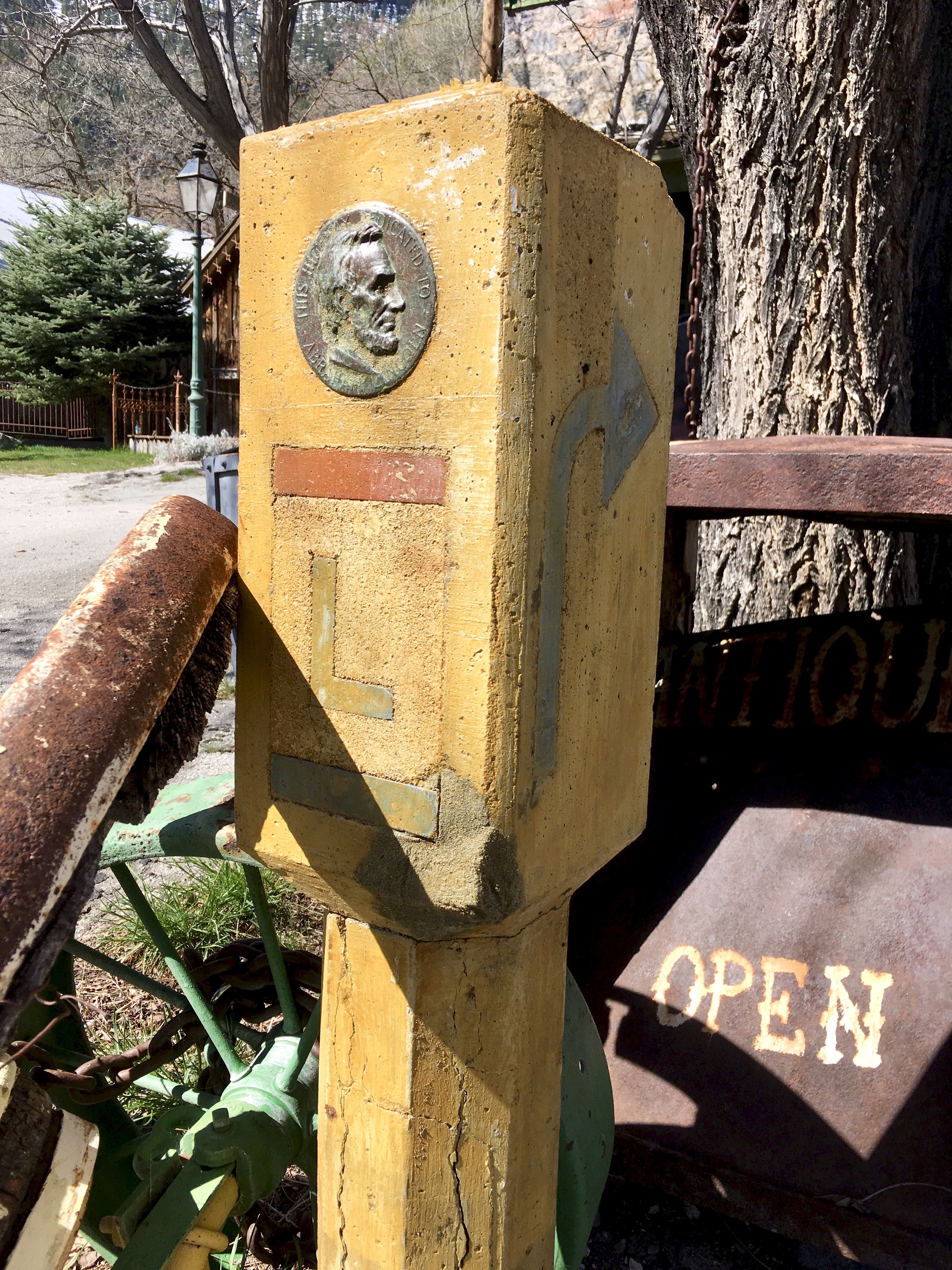
Lincoln Highway Marker - Genoa

In Nevada, the original 1913 highway entered on county roads west of Ibapah, Utah near the Pony Express stop of Eightmile, Nevada, and then past the ghost towns of Tippett and Schellbourne. At what is now U.S. Route 93, the Lincoln Highway turned south, passing through McGill to Ely. In the mid-1920s, the routing was realigned to enter Nevada via the Wendover Cut-off. The road then headed south towards Ely along what is now Alternate U.S. Route 93.

From Ely to Fallon, the highway followed U.S. Route 50 through Eureka and Austin. A shortcut is now Nevada State Route 722 between Austin and Middlegate.

West of Fallon, the Sierra Nevada Northern Route followed Alternate US Route 50 to Fernley, then old US 40 (paralleling I-80) through Reno to Verdi, Nevada on the California state line.

To get to Carson City from Reno, the current routing of US 395 Alternate was used.

The Sierra Nevada Southern Route continued down US Route 50 from Fallon through Carson City up King's Canyon Grade, over Spooner Summit, or to Genoa following the old Pony Express route then up Kingsbury Grade and around the south end of Lake Tahoe to Stateline, Nevada on the California state line.

== California ==
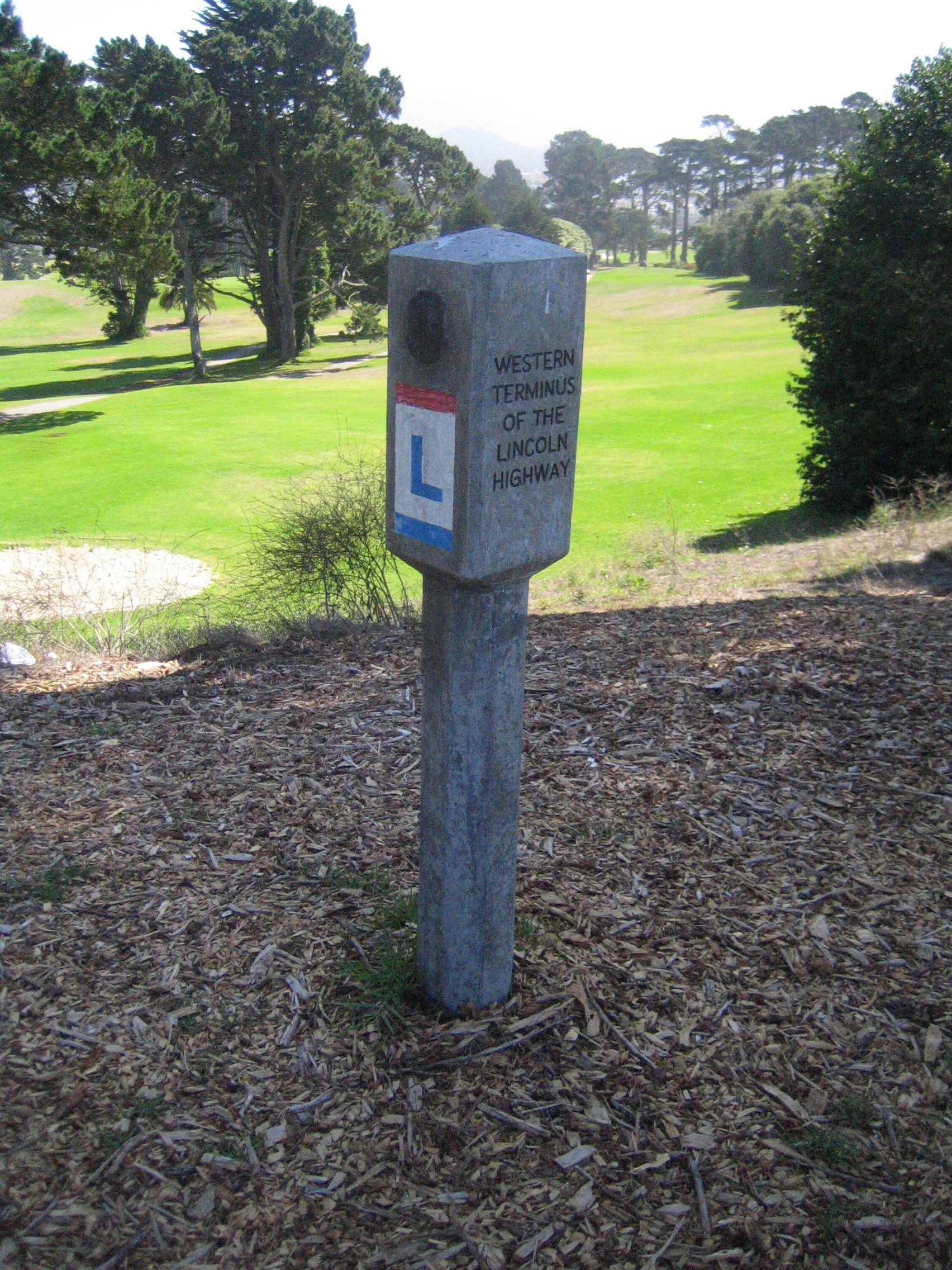
Marker at the western terminus of the Lincoln Highway in San Francisco

In California, the Lincoln Highway followed two different routes over the Sierra Nevada.

The Sierra Nevada Northern Route from Verdi, Nevada to Sacramento followed the old Dog Valley / Henness Pass route from Verdi to Truckee, then westbound on Donner Pass Road (old US 40) up to the top of Donner Pass, then continuing west on Donner Pass Rd, Hampshire Rocks Rd and various other mountain roads parallelling I-80 through Emigrant Gap, Magra, Colfax, Weimar, Applegate, and Auburn. The route then continued southwest on what became old US 40 through the northeastern Sacramento outreaches of Newcastle, Loomis, Rocklin, and Roseville, then turned south on Auburn Blvd to Citrus Heights, then turned southwest, following Auburn Blvd, Del Paso Blvd, and 12th Street into downtown Sacramento to the California State Capitol.

The Sierra Nevada Southern Route from Stateline, Nevada and Lake Tahoe to Sacramento followed the Pioneer Trail and Meyers Grade Road to the top of Echo Summit, then westbound on Johnson Pass Rd to US 50, then westbound on 50 (with many adjacent parallel jogs on mountain roads) through Twin Bridges, Strawberry, Kyburz, Whitehall, Riverton, and Pacific House. At Pollock Pines, the route followed the Pony Express Trail and Carson Road to Broadway and Main Street in Placerville. West of Placerville the route followed Forni Rd, Pleasant Valley Rd, Mother Lode Dr, Durock Rd, Country Club Dr, Old Bass Lake Rd, White Rock Rd, Placerville Rd, and East Bidwell St into Folsom. It turned west through downtown Folsom, then southwest on Folsom Blvd following it all the way into downtown Sacramento, arriving at the California State Capitol on M St (now Capitol Mall).

From Sacramento to San Francisco, the original 1913–1927 Central Valley Route departed Sacramento southbound on Stockton Blvd to Rt 99, then southbound on 99 to Galt, then south on Lower Sacramento Rd to Pacific Ave and El Dorado St into downtown Stockton. From Stockton, the route departed southbound on Center St to French Camp Turnpike, Manthey Rd, and French Camp Rd to the town of French Camp, then Harlan Rd and Manthey Rd (again) southwest to 11th St into Banta, jogging through Banta, then west on 11th (again) into Tracy (old US 50). From Tracy, it followed Byron Rd, Grant Line Rd and Altamont Pass Rd to the top of Altamont Pass. It continued west on Altamont Pass Rd arriving in Livermore via Northfront Rd, Vasco Rd, First St and Junction Ave. From Livermore, the route followed today's I-580 westbound into Dublin, then into Castro Valley via Dublin Canyon Blvd., to East Castro Valley Blvd., Grove Way, and A Street into downtown Hayward. From Hayward to downtown Oakland it followed Foothill Blvd, I-580 (again), MacArthur Blvd, Foothill Blvd (again), First Ave, 13th St, Harrison St, 9th St and Broadway to a ferry pier on the Oakland Estuary (now Jack London Square) for an automobile ferry to the Ferry Slips at the south end of the Ferry Building, at the base of Market Street, in San Francisco.

Upon the completion of the first Carquinez Strait Bridge at Vallejo in 1927, the Lincoln Highway from Sacramento to San Francisco was re-routed over this much shorter alignment. The 1928 Central Valley Route departed the California State Capitol in Sacramento heading westbound on Capitol Mall, West Capitol Avenue, and across the Yolo Causeway to Davis on Olive Drive. West of Davis the route followed old US 40 as it "stairstepped" through the towns of Dixon from I 80, beginning at CA 113 south to Vacaville, Fairfield, Rockville, and Cordelia. From Cordelia the route followed Rt 12 (Jameson Canyon Rd) into the base of Napa Valley to an area that includes the city of American Canyon, then turned south to follow Rt 29 and Broadway into Vallejo where it followed Alameda St and Fifth St to the Carquinez Strait Bridge. South of the bridge, it followed San Pablo Avenue all the way through Rodeo, Pinole, San Pablo, Richmond, El Cerrito and Albany to Berkeley, where it turned west on University Ave to end at the Berkeley Pier for a ferry to the Hyde Street Pier in San Francisco.

Arriving in San Francisco from 1913 to 1921, you departed the ferry from Oakland at the Ferry Slips at the south end of the Ferry Building, drove west on Market St, right on Van Ness Ave, left on Chestnut St (past the 1915 Panama-Pacific Exhibition), entered the Presidio via the Lombard Gates, departed the Presidio via the Arguello Gates, right on Lake St, left on El Camino del Mar, entering into Lincoln Park from the northwest.

Arriving in San Francisco from 1922 to 1927, you departed the ferry from Oakland at the Ferry Slips at the south end of the Ferry Building, drove west on Market St, right on Post St (a traffic movement that is impossible today, as Post runs one-way eastbound), left on Presidio Ave, right on Geary Boulevard, right on 36th Ave, entering into Lincoln Park from the south (now enter via 34th).

Arriving in San Francisco in 1928, you departed the ferry from Berkeley at the Hyde Street Pier, drove south on Hyde, right on North Point St, left on Van Ness Ave, right on California St, right on 32nd Avenue, left on El Camino del Mar, entering into Lincoln Park from the northwest.

Since 1915, the Lincoln Highway Western Terminus has been the plaza and fountain in front of where the Legion of Honor now stands in Lincoln Park. The Western Terminus Marker and the Interpretive Plaque is located at the southeast corner of the plaza, next to the bus stop, adjacent to the entrance drive leading up from 34th Ave.
