= Fish Springs =

Fish Springs may refer to a location in the United States:

- Desert Shores, California, formerly known as Fish Springs
- Fish Springs, California
- Fish Springs, Nevada
- Fish Springs, Tennessee
- Fish Springs National Wildlife Refuge, Utah
- Fish Springs Range, Utah
- Fish Springs, Utah
