= Masego Mbaakanyi =

Motswana entrepreneur

- Occupations: Entrepreneur; Fintech advocate; Investment analyst; Board director
- Known for: Co-founding FinTech Association Botswana; Women Fintech Africa; Advocacy for financial inclusion

Masego Mbaakanyi is a Motswana entrepreneur, fintech advocate, and social impact leader. She is a co-founding member of the FinTech Association Botswana and the founder of Women Fintech Africa. Her career spans investment analysis, technology research, and entrepreneurship, with a focus on building collaborative fintech ecosystems in Botswana and across the African continent. She has also served on multiple non-profit boards internationally and has been recognised as an advocate for women in ICT and financial inclusion.

== Career ==
Mbaakanyi began her professional career as an investment analyst, working on the analysis of stocks and fixed-income securities. She later worked as an ICT research analyst at the global growth consulting firm Frost & Sullivan, where she contributed to research on gender representation in the technology sector.

Her exposure to fintech solutions through extensive travel and work in the United States, Asia, Europe, and the United Arab Emirates, where she observed widespread adoption of digital payments, robo-advisory tools, and alternative credit systems, drove her growing interest in the potential of financial technology to transform African economies. This led her to co-found the FinTech Association Botswana in 2021, an organization established to build a collaborative and less fragmented fintech ecosystem in Botswana, connecting innovators, academics, regulators, and financial institutions around shared goals of financial inclusion, cybersecurity, and open banking.

The association became part of the Africa Fintech Network, a network of 35 fintech associations across Africa, giving Botswana-based innovators access to cross-continental knowledge sharing, mentorship, and exposure to international funding platforms.

In addition to her fintech work, Mbaakanyi founded Women Fintech Africa, an organization focused on advancing the participation of women in the continent's financial technology sector.

== Board roles and public engagement ==
Mbaakanyi has served on the boards of several non-profit organisations. She was elected as a board director of the AgriUT Foundation, a charitable organisation dedicated to alleviating poverty among smallholder farmers, with operations spanning North America, Africa, Singapore, and Australia. Her selection was described by the Foundation's CEO as bringing expertise in business, philanthropy, and social impact to the board's global membership.

She has also publicly advocated for greater participation of women in the ICT and fintech industries. Speaking as an ICT research analyst at Frost & Sullivan in 2013, she attributed the underrepresentation of women in technology to social stereotypes that framed the sector as unsuitable for women, and called for women-focused startup programmes and innovation centres as structural solutions.
