= Valley View University =

Private university in Ghana

- Motto: Excellence, Integrity, Service
- Type: Private university
- Established: 1979; 47 years ago
- Vice-Chancellor: Professor Daniel Bediako
- Location: Oyibi (Accra), Kumasi & Techiman (Sunyani), Ghana; 5.79932634°N 0.12609229°W
- Campus: Urban area
Colours
White, Sky blue and Black
- Website: www.vvu.edu.gh

Valley View University is a private university with campuses located at Oyibi (Accra), Kumasi and Techiman (Sunyani) respectively in the Greater Accra, Ashanti and Bono East regions of Ghana. It forms part of a worldwide system of over 100 tertiary institutions operated by the Seventh-day Adventist Church.

It is a part of the Seventh-day Adventist education system, the world's second largest Christian school system.

== History ==
Valley View University was established in 1979 by the West African Union Mission of Seventh-day Adventists (now Ghana Union Conference). In 1997, it was absorbed into the Adventist university system operated by the West-Central Africa Division (WAD) with headquarters in Abidjan, Côte d'Ivoire. The Ghana Union Conference of Seventh-day Adventists (organized in 2000) serves as the local manager of the university.

The university began as the Adventist Missionary College and was located in Bekwai-Ashanti. It was transferred to Adentan near Accra in 1983 where it operated in rented facilities until it was relocated to its present site near Oyibi (19 miles down Accra-Dodowa Road). In 1989 and was renamed Valley View College.

The Adventist Accrediting Association (AAA) has, since 1983, been evaluating and reviewing the accreditation status of the institution. In 1995, the university was affiliated to Griggs University in Silver Spring, Maryland, USA. This allowed the university to offer four year bachelor's degrees in Theology and Religious Studies. The National Accreditation Board (Ghana) granted it national accreditation in 1995 thus allowing the university to award her own degrees. Thus, Valley View University became the first private institution in Ghana to be granted national accreditation.

Valley View University has the singular distinction of being the first private university in Ghana to be granted a Charter. Valley View University received its Charter from President John Kufuor (President of Ghana), at a special function on 28 May 2006. A "Chartered" institution implies one that has been granted certain rights and privileges by the president or the legislature of Ghana. To obtain this legal status, the institute's statutes, examination procedures and quality assurance standards are subjected to parliamentary scrutiny.

== Accreditation ==
Valley View University is accredited by the Accrediting Association of Adventist Schools, Colleges and Universities. Valley View University is therefore a member of a network of over 100 colleges and universities operated by the Seventh-day Adventist Church worldwide. The university is also accredited by the National Accreditation Board of the Government of Ghana for the various programmes leading to a certificates, diploma and degrees in many disciplines and specialization

== Notable alumni ==
- Kenneth Okolie, Nigerian actor and model
- Ethel Delali Cofie, Technology Entrepreneur
- Mohammad Habibu Tijani, Ghanaian politician and member of the Seventh Parliament of the Fourth Republic of Ghana

== Affiliations ==
Valley View University is affiliated with Griggs University (GU) in distance learning. Under special arrangement with Griggs University, Silver Spring, Maryland, USA, Valley View University offers four-year Distance Education degree programmes in Business Administration and Religious Studies. The school also have a campus at Techiman in the Bono East Region of Ghana.

Valley View University is also affiliated with the following universities:

- Bauhaus University, Weimar, Germany
- University of Applied Sciences, Augsburg, Germany
- University of Applied Science, Magdeburg, Germany
- University of Hohenheim, Germany
- Sahmyook University, South Korea
- Griggs University in Maryland, USA

Valley View University is a member of the following associations:

- West African Association of Theological Institutions (WAATI).
- Ghana Association of Private Tertiary Institutions (GAPTI).
- Conference of Heads of Private Universities, Ghana (CHPUG)

== See also ==
- List of Seventh-day Adventist colleges and universities
- Seventh-day Adventist education
- Seventh-day Adventist Church
- Seventh-day Adventist theology
- History of the Seventh-day Adventist Church
- Adventist Colleges and Universities
- List of universities in Ghana
