= Aneth David =

Tanzanian biotechnologist

Aneth Bella David
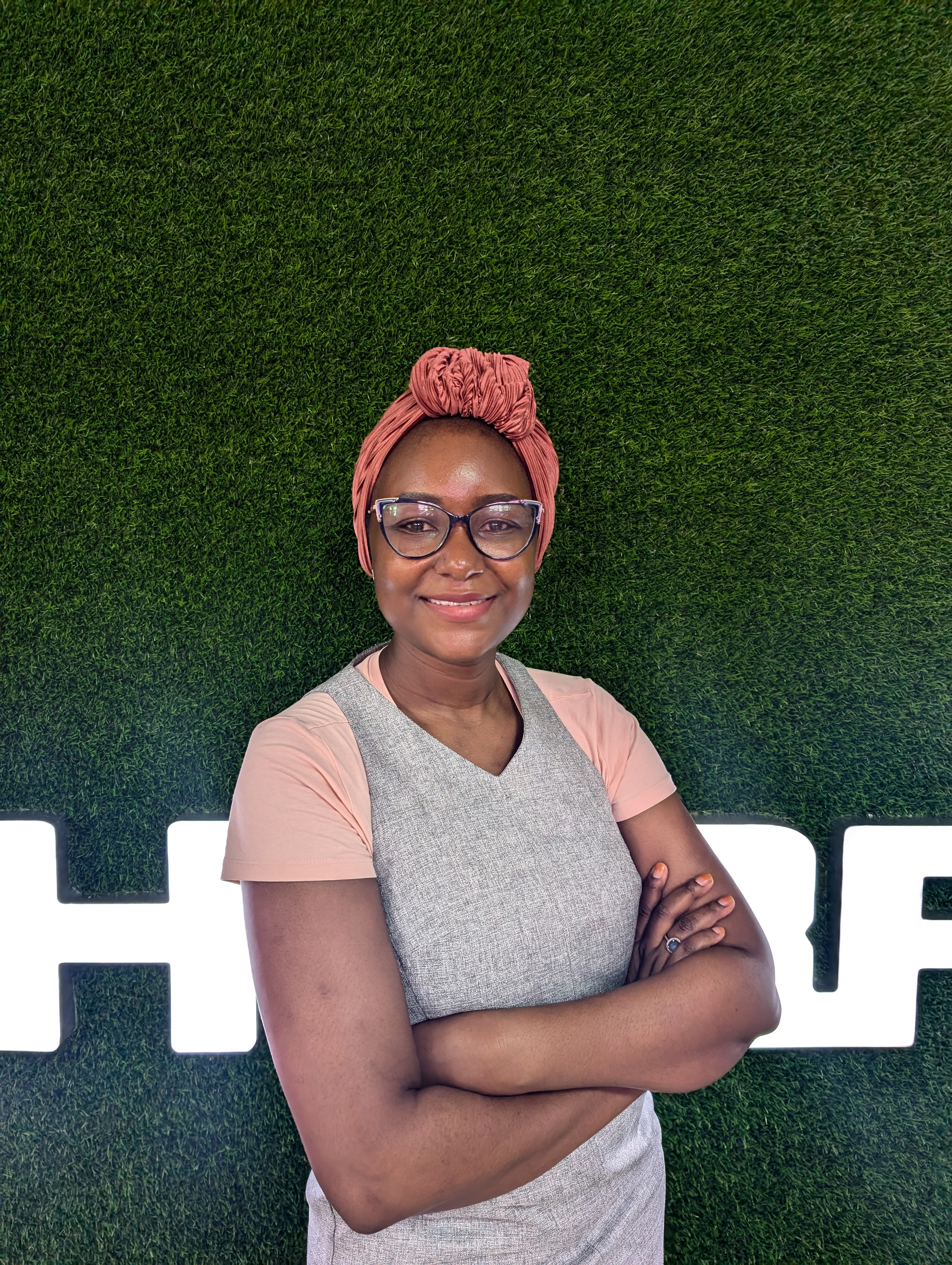
- David in 2025
- Born: Aneth Bella Mwakilili; 18 November 1990 (age 35); Tanzania
- Education: University of Dar es Salaam (BSc, MSc); Swedish University of Agricultural Sciences (PhD)
- Known for: research on biotechnological tools for sustainable agricultural development
- Scientific career
- Fields: Biotechnology
- Workplaces: University of Dar es Salaam; Next Einstein Forum; Women in Tech Africa; Tanzania Human Genetics Organization; Open Science Community of Tanzania and Africa; Biotechnology Society of Tanzania; Open Forum for Agricultural Biotechnology
- Thesis: Revisiting push-pull technology: Below and aboveground mechanisms for ecosystem services (2022)
- Website: www.anethdavid.com

Aneth Bella David (formerly Mwakilili; born 18 November 1990) is a Tanzanian biotechnologist and molecular biologist. She focuses on utilising biotechnological tools for sustainable agricultural development. She co-founded the Tanzania Human Genetics Organization (THGO), the Open Science Community of Tanzania and Africa and the Biotechnology Society of Tanzania (BST). She also advocates for young people and women in STEM fields.

== Biography ==
David was born on 18 November 1990. She attended primary and secondary school in Moshi. She studied a BSc and MSc in biotechnology at the University of Dar es Salaam (UDSM). She was awarded a PhD in biology by the Department of Plant Protection Biology at the Swedish University of Agricultural Sciences (SLU) in Uppsala, Sweden.

David co-founded the Tanzania Human Genetics Organization (THGO), the Open Science Community of Tanzania and Africa and the Biotechnology Society of Tanzania (BST). She sits on the advisory board for the Open Forum for Agricultural Biotechnology (OFAB).

As an Ambassador for the Next Einstein Forum, David has fundraised to provide science books for Tanzanian schools and has met with the Deputy Minister for the Ministry of Health and Social Welfare (Tanzania) to discuss contributions that biotechnology could make to the health sector. She has contributed to calls for changes in policy around the needs of individuals with rare diseases.

David is currently a lecturer at UDSM, is the country lead for Women in Tech Africa (WiTA) and an Accelerating Science And Publication In Biology (ASAPbio) fellow.

In 2024, David was awarded a BioInnovate Africa Women in Science Fellowship and is being hosted at the East African Science and Technology Commission (EASTECO) in Kigali, Rwanda with Fortunate Muyambi as her mentor. Her fellowship work is focusing on biofertilizers and promoting food security and sustainable farming. She has also researched the use of soil microorganisms to improve crop yield, has written on malaria transmission for The Chanzo, and has contributed to research published in the academic journal Plant and Soil.

David is also interested in beekeeping.

== Awards ==
- Ambassador prize by the Next Einstein Forum (2015)
- Women in STEM Careers Award by the Next Einstein Forum (2022)
- Included on the Tanzanian Scientists wall of fame at the STEM Park in Tanga
