= Félicie Albert =

French and American plasma physicist

- Citizenship: United States of America
- Education: Ecole Centrale de Marseille (B.S.); University of Central Florida (M.S.); Polytechnique (PhD)
- Scientific career
- Thesis: Synchrotron radiation based on laser-plasma interaction in the relativistic range (2007)
- Doctoral advisor: Antoine Rousse

Félicie Albert is a French and American physicist working on laser plasma accelerators. She is the deputy director for the Center for High Energy Density Science at Lawrence Livermore National Laboratory and staff scientist at the National Ignition Facility and Photon Science Directorate and the Joint High Energy Density Sciences organization.

== Education and career ==
She received a BS in 2003 in engineering from École Nationale Supérieure de Physique de Marseille (now École Centrale de Marseille), in France, her master's degree in optics from the University of Central Florida in 2004 and her PhD from prestigious École Polytechnique with advisor Antoine Rousse in 2007. Her PhD thesis is entitled "Synchrotron radiation based on laser-plasma interaction in the relativistic range." Albert then joined Lawrence Livermore National Laboratory as a postdoctoral fellow in 2008. Her main areas of expertise are "the generation and applications of novel sources of electrons, X-rays and gamma-rays through laser-plasma interaction, laser-wakefield acceleration and Compton scattering."

Albert became a naturalized American citizen in 2018.

== Awards and recognition ==
She received the Katherine E. Weimer Award from the American Physical Society in 2017, and the Presidential Early Career Award for Science and Engineers in 2019. Also in 2019, she was named a Fellow of the American Physical Society, after a nomination from the APS Division of Plasma Physics, "for many original contributions to the development of directional X-ray beams for probing high-energy-density matter". In 2023, she was named a Fellow of Optica, "for pioneering research on the development and applications of x-ray sources driven by laser-wakefield acceleration and leadership in the LaserNetUS initiative."
