= Ethel Delali Cofie =

Ghanaian entrepreneur

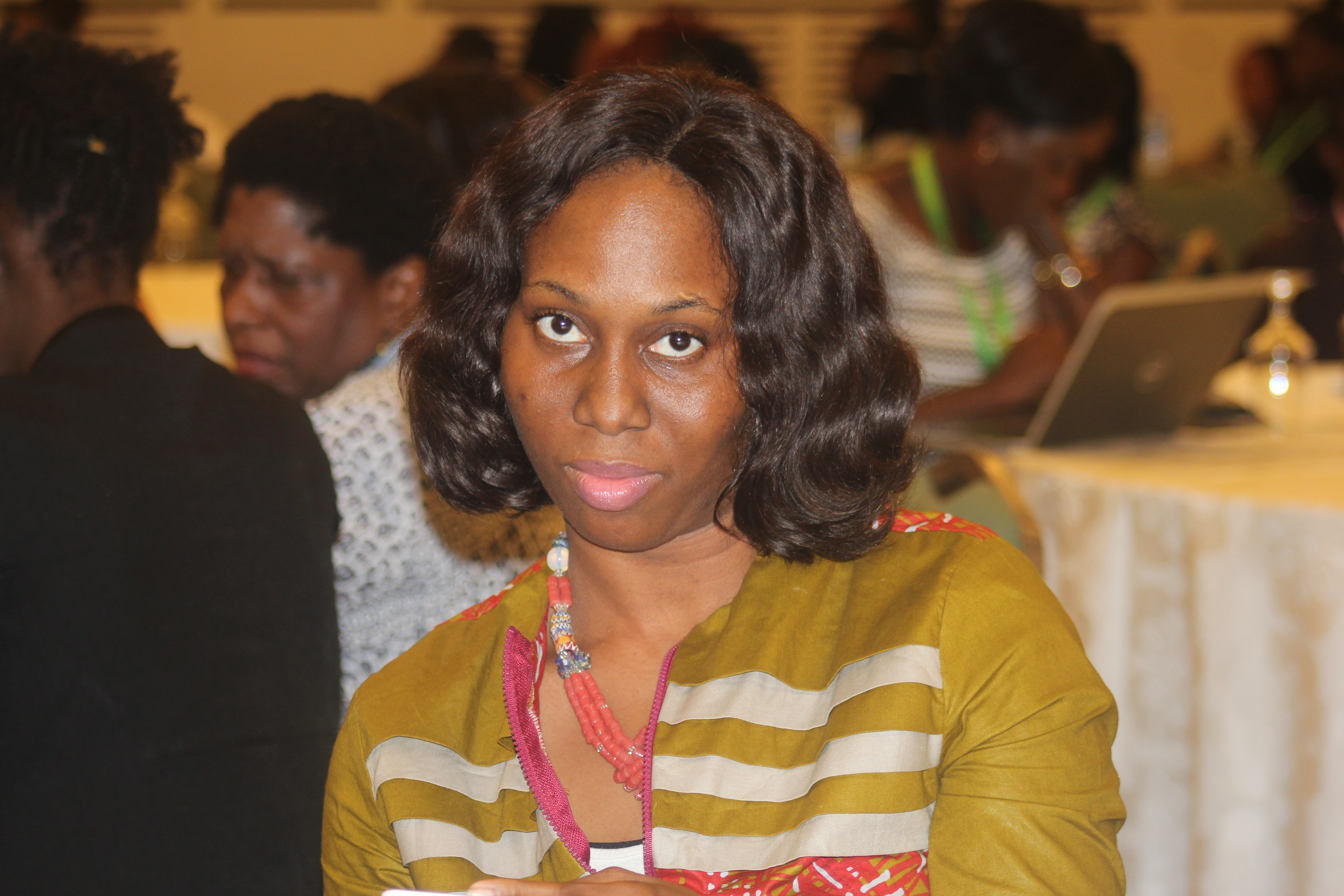
- Occupation: Technology Entrepreneur
- Organization(s): EDEL Technology Consulting & Women in Tech Africa
- Known for: Creating the largest Women in Tech group on the African Continent spanning 30 countries
- Website: ethelcofie.com

Ethel Delali Cofie is a Ghanaian entrepreneur, IT professional and consultant. She is a founding member of Women in Tech Africa. She is also the CEO and founder of Edel Technology Consulting.

== Education ==
Cofie has a bachelor's degree in computer science from the Valley View University in Ghana, a master's degree in Distribution Systems from the University of Brighton, and an Executive Degree in Leadership, Business and Entrepreneurship from the Yale School of Management.

== Career and affiliations ==
Cofie has held various technological and commercial roles in the United Kingdom, Nigeria, and Sierra Leone. She has worked with Vodafone Ghana as Head of Commercial Solutions.

Cofie is the CEO and Founder of EDEL Technology Consulting, an IT consulting company in West Africa and Europe. She is a member of the board of companies across Africa, including Egotickets and AMOSS Holdings SA.

== Awards and recognition ==
- Fellow of United States President Barack Obama's Young African Leaders Initiative Network (YALI)
- 2020 Glitz Africa Ghana Women award
- Avance Media 100 Most Influential Women.
