= Dugway Range =

Mountain range in Utah, USA

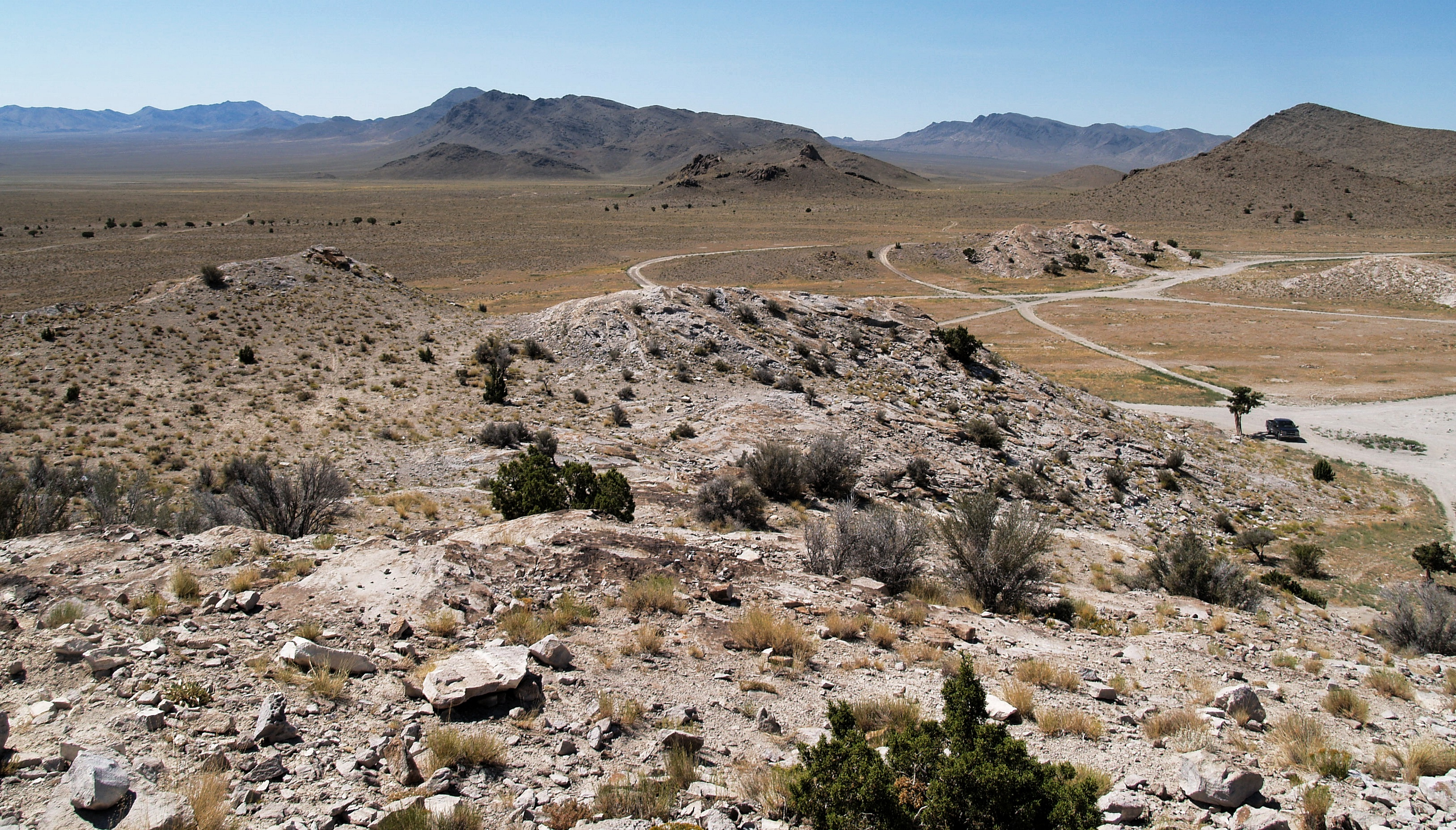
- Dugway Range-(horizon, photo left, ~16 mi) view (north-northwest) of Topaz Mtn, (Thomas Range, north Sevier Desert)

Highest point
- Peak: Castle Mountain (Utah)
- Elevation: 6,748 ft (2,057 m)
- Coordinates: 39°57′05″N 113°08′28″W

Dimensions
- Length: 13 mi (21 km) NW x SE (Dugway Ridge, extends 2.5 mi southwest, from southern terminus)

Geography
- Location within Utah
- Country: United States
- State: Utah
- Regions: Great Basin Desert and Great Salt Lake Desert
- Counties: Tooele and Juab
- Communities: Fish Springs, Callao and Dugway
- Borders on: Great Salt Lake Desert, Granite Peak, Dugway Valley, Thomas Range, Fish Springs National Wildlife Refuge and Fish Springs Range

The Dugway Range is a 13-mile (21 km) long mountain range located in central-south Tooele County, Utah, on the Juab County north border.

The Dugway Range extends northwesterly into the south of the Great Salt Lake Desert, the region at the west and southwest of the Great Salt Lake, about three times its area, a region of a flat white, salt flat, flat alluvial plains, and some alluvial mountain range pediments. It is the location of the Bonneville Salt Flats.

The 8 mi (13 km) long Granite Mountain lies 4 mi (6 km) north of the range; the mountain is a traveler's landmark with landscape sketches made in the 1800s (1859).

== Description ==
The Dugway Range is about 13 mi (21 km) long, with a spur on the south terminus. The spur extends 2.5 mi (4 km) southwest into the Great Salt Lake Desert. The spur, Dugway Ridge, is about 5 mi (8 km) long, south-southwest trending mostly, and ends at Pyramid Peak, 6,120 feet (1,865 m).

The highpoint of the range is Castle Mountain (Utah), 6,748 feet (2,057 m)), near the range's center, in the main ridgeline region.

=== Satellite landforms to the range ===
With the elevation of the Great Salt Lake about 4,200 ft (1,280 m) (4,196 ft (1,279 m), in 2006), and Bonneville Salt Flats, at 4,219 ft (1,286 m), the surrounding salt flats around the mountain range, are about 4,220 ft (1,286 m). Between the Fish Lakes to the southwest, actual foothills above the Great Salt Lake Desert saltflats exist. Washes converge off the southwest flank; they flow southwest, then converge in a shallow valley, with three washes flowing northwest to the GSLD saltflat. Adjacent southwest is a circular, Black Rock Hills, 5,554 feet (1,693 m), (1,334 ft (407 m) prominence, 5 mi (8 km) diameter), 4 mi (6 km) east of the Fish Lakes, and about 8 mi (13 km) due southwest of the Dugway foothills.

Northeast of the Dugway Range, and east of Granite Mountain are the GSLD salt flats. They extend halfway southeast, along the range's northeast flank, to meet the outflow terminus at the northwest of Dugway Valley, which itself trends mostly southeast, about 17 mi (27 km). The valley contains Table Mountain Reservoir (0.15 mi (0 km) diameter), located 3 mi (5 km) due-west of Table Mountain, 5,766 ft (1,757 m). Dissected hills and flats border the valley's northeast; also, with the same northwest trendline as the Dugways, the Old River Bed courses along, about 15 mi (24 km), a circuitous wash-bed, containing Old River Bed Road.

South of the range at Pony Express Road, is Dugway Pass. The Dugway foothills from here merge south and south-southeast into the northern foothills of the Thomas Range.

Adjacent at the south terminus of Granite Mountain, is a small rock "island", Sapphire Mountain, 4,791 ft (1,460 m), 1.5 mi (2 km) long (571 ft (174 m) prominence). Sapphire Mountain is 2.55 mi (4 km) from the Dugway foothills, and 0.5 mi (1 km) from the Granite Mountain perimeter.

== Access ==
By way of unimproved roads, the Dugway Range can be accessed from the west, the region of the Fish Springs National Wildlife Refuge at the north of the Fish Springs Range; the routes are accessed from Callao, 17 mi (27 km) west, and about 12 mi (19 km) from the Dugways. The route from Fish Springs is called Pony Express Road, and transits around the southern range terminus and the Pyramid Peak spur.

From Pony Express Road, an unimproved road encircles the mountain range, northwest, north, and east; the route is about 27 mi (43 km) long.

The range can also be accessed from the east, northeast, from Dugway, (by Utah State Route 199 and Utah 196), on unimproved roads. Dugway is located about 30 mi (48 km) northeast of the Dugway Range.

Off-road routes can reach Granite Mountain (Tooele County, Utah) from the range's north terminus; Granite Peak "island" is 4 mi (6 km) distant across the salt flat desert. Other routes from the east, the Dugway region, also access Granite Mountain's east region.

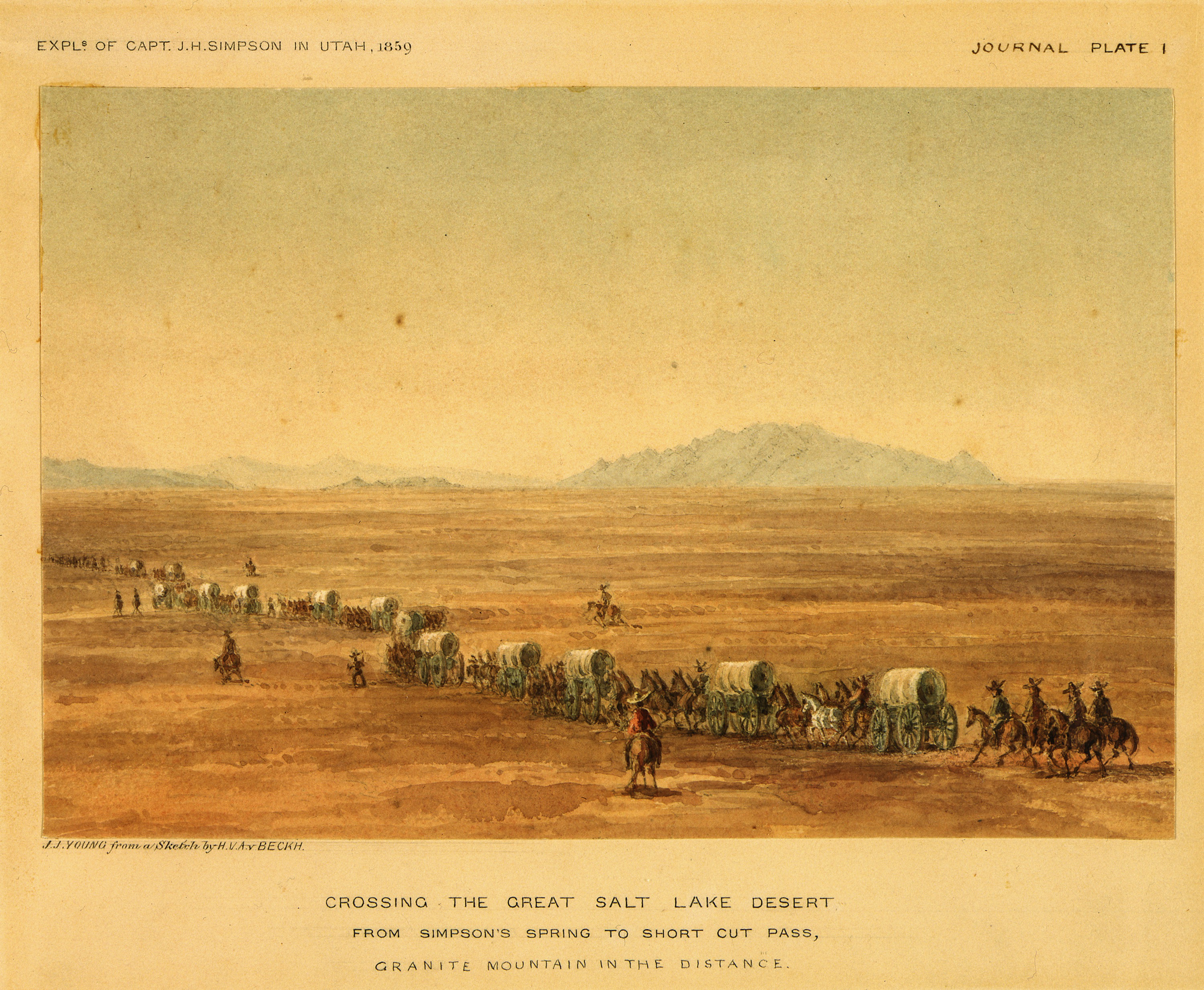
A traveling landmark: Granite Mountain (Tooele County, Utah), an 1859 art sketch
