= Weimar University =

Private university in Weimar, California, U.S.

- Former names: Weimar Center of Health & Education, Weimar Institute
- Type: Private university
- Established: 1978
- Religious affiliation: Christian
- President: Neil Nedley
- Location: Weimar, California, United States; 39°02′13″N 120°58′35″W
- Campus: Rural, 457 acres (1.85 km^{2})
- Website: www.weimar.edu

Weimar University, formerly Weimar Institute, Weimar College and Weimar Center of Health & Education, is a private university in Weimar, California. It operates an academy, and lifestyle-oriented health care center. It highlights traditional Seventh-day Adventist principles of health and education. Although founded by Adventists, it has never been legally affiliated with the Seventh-day Adventist Church.

== History ==
Weimar University is located on the property formerly occupied by the Weimar Joint Sanatorium (AKA Weimar Chest Center and Weimar Medical Center), which operated from 1919 to 1972. Following the closure, the property changed hands several times, and in 1975 it reopened as Hope Village, a temporary relocation center for Vietnamese refugees.

In May 1977, a group of Seventh-day Adventists purchased the 457 acres (1.85 km^{2}). In 1978 it was registered as the nonprofit organization, Weimar Institute of Health & Education, and Weimar College was opened. In 1981 Weimar Academy was established as a private four-year Christian boarding high school. At that time Dr Colin Standish, an Australian educator with a PhD in Psychology and Master of Education, was appointed to oversee the college program. Dr Standish later moved to establish Hartland Institute in Virginia, another self-supporting Seventh-day Adventist college, which also ran a parallel health program.

In early 2008, Weimar Institute announced that it would close Weimar College at the end of June 2008. Later that year, however, the institute merged with Amazing Facts and a combined board was established to oversee the operations of Weimar Institute and its divisions. An announcement stated:

After two years of heartfelt prayer, study, discussion, and observing the leading of the Lord, Amazing Facts and Weimar Institute voted on April 6, 2008 to proceed with a bold new joint venture. Their respective boards approved an agreement whereby the operations of Weimar Institute will be administered by Amazing Facts with a new board of directors providing direction to both ministries.

Subsequent to the decision to jointly operate Weimar, it was realized that operating a college, academy, and lifestyle center required a different focus than operating a media ministry and that Amazing Facts and Weimar Institute would be better served to operate cooperatively, but separately, and the two separated amicably. Amazing Facts and Weimar Institute continue to work cooperatively.

A long-term focus of Weimar has been the NEWSTART Program. It is part of Weimar's health care program and is primarily focused on lifestyle-based crisis intervention and training for recovery from diabetes and life-threatening heart problems. NEWSTART is an acronym and stands for Nutrition, Exercise, Water, Sunlight, Temperance, Air, Rest, and Trust (in Divine Power).

== Academics ==
In 1978, Weimar College opened on the semester system. It now offers a BA in Christian Education, BA in Religion, BBA in Business Administration, BS in Natural Sciences, AS in Nursing, BS in Nursing, BA in Interdisciplinary Studies, and a lifestyle and health coach certificate.

In the past, Weimar College was affiliated with Griggs University. According to the college 2011-2012 academic bulletin, this affiliation enabled completion of select degrees through Griggs University. In the fall of 2012, Weimar College discontinued their association with Griggs University and no longer offer Griggs University credits.

Perusal of accreditation through the Western Association of Schools and Colleges (WASC) began during the 2009-2010 academic year as reflected in the corresponding academic bulletin. The WASC Senior College and University Commission granted eligibility to Weimar Institute during the 2015-2016 academic year. In February 2017, the institute was granted candidacy status for five years during which the college could advance to initial accreditation if the commission's qualifications were met. According to the March 2017 accreditation progress report, the institute was scheduled to receive a visit from the WASC commission to determine eligibility for initial accreditation in the fall of 2018. In the subsequent commission report, the institute was granted initial accreditation for a period of six years retroactive to January 1, 2018. The university also has approval to operate under the California Bureau for Private Postsecondary Education.

=== Nursing program ===
On May 18, 2011, the college requested a study of the feasibility of starting an Associate Degree nursing program. It has a state-approved pre-nursing program and started an Associate Degree program in nursing that began in Fall 2015, with state approval from the California Board of Registered Nursing. In May 2019, the institute announced a new Bachelor of Science in nursing program which accepted its first cohort of students for the fall of 2019.

== See also ==
- Independent ministries of the Seventh-day Adventist Church
