= Plant and Soil =

- Discipline: Plant-soil relationships
- Language: English
- Edited by: Hans Lambers

Publication details
- History: 1948–present
- Publisher: Springer Science+Business Media on behalf of the Royal Netherlands Society of Agricultural Science (Netherlands)
- Frequency: Monthly
- Impact factor: 4.192 (2020)

Standard abbreviations
- ISO 4: Plant Soil

Indexing
- CODEN: PLSOA2
- ISSN: 0032-079X (print); 1573-5036 (web)
- LCCN: 51001296
- OCLC no.: 643597437

Links
- Journal homepage; Online archive

Plant and Soil is a monthly peer-reviewed scientific journal covering research on the relationships between plants and soil, such as relationships and interactions of plants with minerals, water and microbes, the anatomy and morphology of roots, soil biology and ecology, etc. It is published by Springer Science+Business Media on behalf of the Royal Netherlands Society of Agricultural Science (Koninklijke Landbouwkundige Vereniging).

The editor-in-chief is Hans Lambers (The University of Western Australia and China Agricultural University). According to the Journal Citation Reports, the journal has a 2020 impact factor of 4.192. The journal is indexed in Scopus and SCImago.
