= Women in Tech Africa =

Entrepreneurship organization in Africa

Women in Tech Africa (WiTA) is an organization with a focus on entrepreneurship expansion and multiplying the numbers of females in technology, especially in Africa. It was founded by Ethel D Cofie. Over the years, WiTA has strategically focused on enabling women to drive Africa's growth story and create an impact on personal life through technology. Currently, its target audience comprises aspiring female tech entrepreneurs between the ages of 18 and 40. Women in Tech Africa is the largest group on the continent with membership across 30 countries globally with physical chapters in Ghana, Malawi, Zimbabwe, Somaliland, Germany, Ireland, Kenya, Tanzania and Mauritius.

== Objectives ==
- Encouraging more women into the technology and taking up leadership positions in technological fields.
- Creating a pipeline for females to choose STEM careers.
- Encouraging women into the STEM entrepreneurial space.

== Major projects ==
=== Women in Tech Week (WiTW) ===
This digital festival brings women in tech globally together to celebrate success and impact through leadership training, peer learning, and workshops. The focus topics are related to technology, entrepreneurship, work–life balance, and leadership. The audience for these events generally comprises women tech entrepreneurs, girls aspiring for STEM careers and C level executive women. These events focus not only on women in Africa but African women all across the globe. Currently, WiTW received an endorsement from the Graca Machel Trust.

=== MTN GirlCode ===
In collaboration with the MTN Foundation, Women in Tech Africa organized the MTN Girl Code project in 2017. This project sought to increase the number of women participating in the MTN App Challenge (an MTN initiative run annually), improve the number of ladies in the coding ecosystem in Ghana and encourage the number of female in the African Startup eco-system. Trainings were in business validation, mobile app and IoT development and game and animation development.

=== #HerFuture Africa Boot Camp ===
In Collaboration with ATBN (UK) and Comic Relief, #HerFuture Africa, is a female entrepreneurship empowerment project aimed at empowering and equipping young women with the necessary tools to address the needs of their respective societies. Participants were trained in design thinking, ideation, project plans, and business model canvas and solution generation. This project saw the rise of Ivy Barley, the founder of Developers in Vogue.

=== #CTA-Agrictech ===
In collaboration with the Technical Centre for Agricultural and Rural Cooperation (CTA) AgriHack Talent Initiative, this initiative aimed at accelerating entrepreneurship for improved livelihoods in the African, Caribbean and Pacific countries. The pitch AgriHack competition was open to founders of ICT solutions that address needs in the agriculture sector.

== Women associated with Women in Tech Africa ==
- Aneth David, Tanzanian biotechnologist

== Awards ==
- United Nations Equals Award for Leadership 2018
