= Paul K. Weimer =

- Born: November 5, 1914; Wabash, Indiana, U.S.
- Died: January 6, 2005 (aged 90); Princeton, New Jersey, U.S.
- Education: Manchester University (BA); University of Kansas (MA); Ohio State University (PhD)
- Known for: Solid-state image sensor Stencil lithography Thin-film transistor Video camera tubes
- Spouse: Katherine Weimer
- Awards: IEEE Morris N. Liebmann Memorial Award (1966); New Jersey Inventors Hall of Fame (1992)
- Scientific career
- Fields: Applied physics
- Workplaces: RCA laboratory
- Thesis: K-electron capture in radioactive argon Ar^{37} (1942)
- Doctoral advisor: Marion Llewellyn Pool

Paul K. Weimer (November 5, 1914 – January 6, 2005) was a noted contributor to the development of television and the thin-film transistor (TFT).

== Early life and education ==
Weimer was born in Wabash, Indiana. He received a B.A. in math and physics from Manchester University (Indiana) in 1936, an M.A. in physics from the University of Kansas in 1938, and a Ph.D. in physics from Ohio State University in 1942. He then joined the RCA laboratory in Princeton, New Jersey, where he worked until retirement in 1981.

== Career ==
His first assignment was to develop an electron multiplier to go with the image orthicon. This tube, which proved to be 100 times more sensitive than its predecessors, was used for the first 20 years of television broadcasting in the United States. In 1961, Weimer began making thin-film transistors in a coplanar process on glass substrates. In a typical process, he would deposit a gold source and drain, then deposit polycrystalline semiconductor material, and place a gate on top. After he placed an insulator between the gate and semiconductor, he got excellent results, as published in his 1962 paper, "The TFT: A New Thin-Film Transistor", in the Proceedings of the IRE.

Weimer held over 90 patents, and was a member of the National Academy of Engineering and fellow of the Institute for Radio Engineers. He received the IRE Television Prize, the 1966 IEEE Morris N. Liebmann Memorial Award, an individual RCA David Sarnoff Outstanding Achievement Award in Science, and the 1986 Kultur Preis of the German Photographic Society. He died in Princeton, New Jersey, at age 90.

== See also ==
- CMOS
