= Fish Springs Range =

Mountain range in Utah, United States

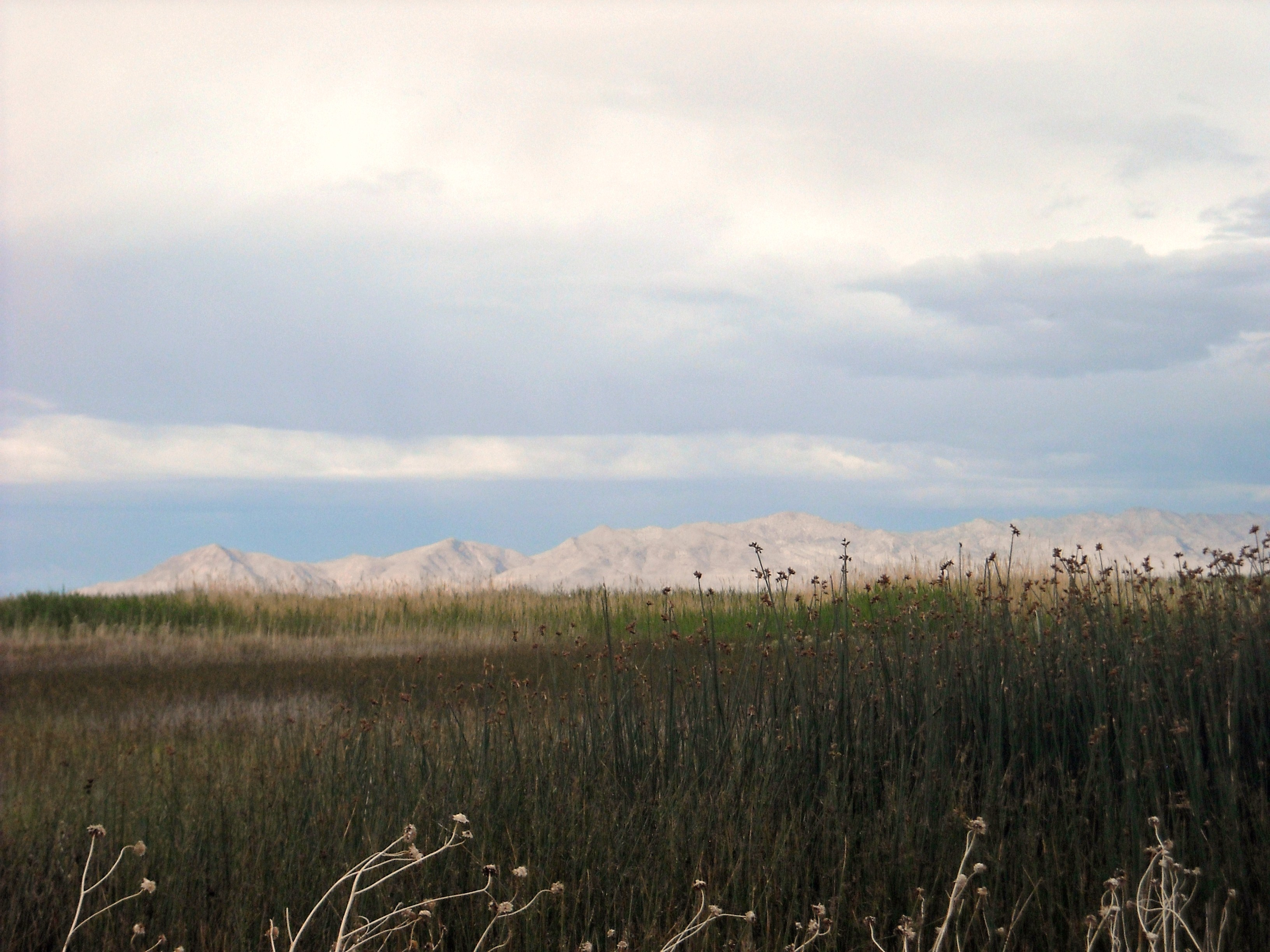
- northeast hills of Fish Springs Range (from Fish Springs)

Highest point
- Peak: George H. Hansen Peak, Fish Springs Range
- Elevation: 2,585 m (8,481 ft)
- Coordinates: 39.7249379°N 113.4404616°W

Dimensions
- Length: 31.53 km (19.59 mi) N-S
- Width: 4.8 km (3.0 mi) E-W

Geography
- Location within Utah
- Country: United States
- State: Utah
- Regions: (Great Basin Desert) (southern)-Great Salt Lake; Desert
- County: Juab
- Community: Fish Springs (site)
- Borders on: Snake Valley-NW (Deep Creek Range-NW); Great Salt Lake Desert-NNW, N & NNE; Fish Springs; National Wildlife Refuge-NE-(attached) (Dugway Range-NE); Fish Springs Flat-E (Thomas Range-E); House Range-SSE; Tule Valley-S; Snake Valley-W

The Fish Springs Range is a 32-kilometre (20 mi) long, narrow, north-south trending mountain range located in center-west Juab County, Utah. The northeast of the range borders the Fish Springs National Wildlife Refuge; the entire east of the range borders the Fish Springs Flat, where the east region of the flat borders the Thomas Range.

The Fish Springs Range lies at the south of the Great Salt Lake Desert. It is in the geologic province known as the Basin and Range.

The south of the range borders the north of Tule Valley.

== Range description ==
The Fish Springs Range is north-south trending, linear, narrow (mostly 3 to 4-mi wide),

Fish Springs Flat borders the east of the range, and west of the range lies a satellite sub-peak (only other regional peak), The Honeycombs, 1,738 metres (5,702 ft).

The highest point of the range is George H. Hansen Peak at 2,585 metres (8,481 ft).

== Access ==
The Fish Springs Range and wildlife refuge can be accessed from the west from Trout Creek. From the east, access can be from the Dugway Range region by unimproved roads, and southeast by the same from Delta, and Utah State Route 174, (through the Sevier Desert).

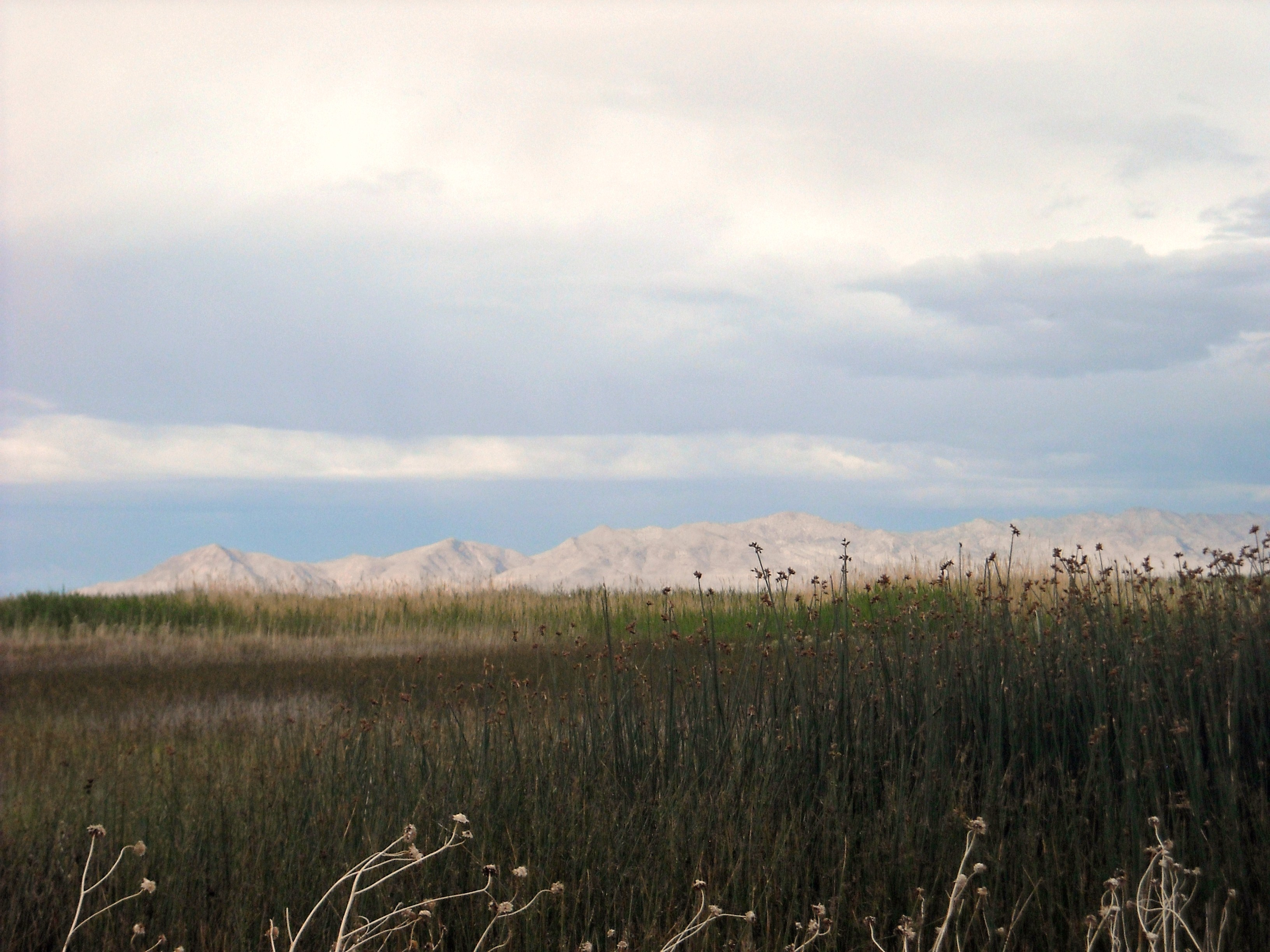
Fish Springs & northern hills of range

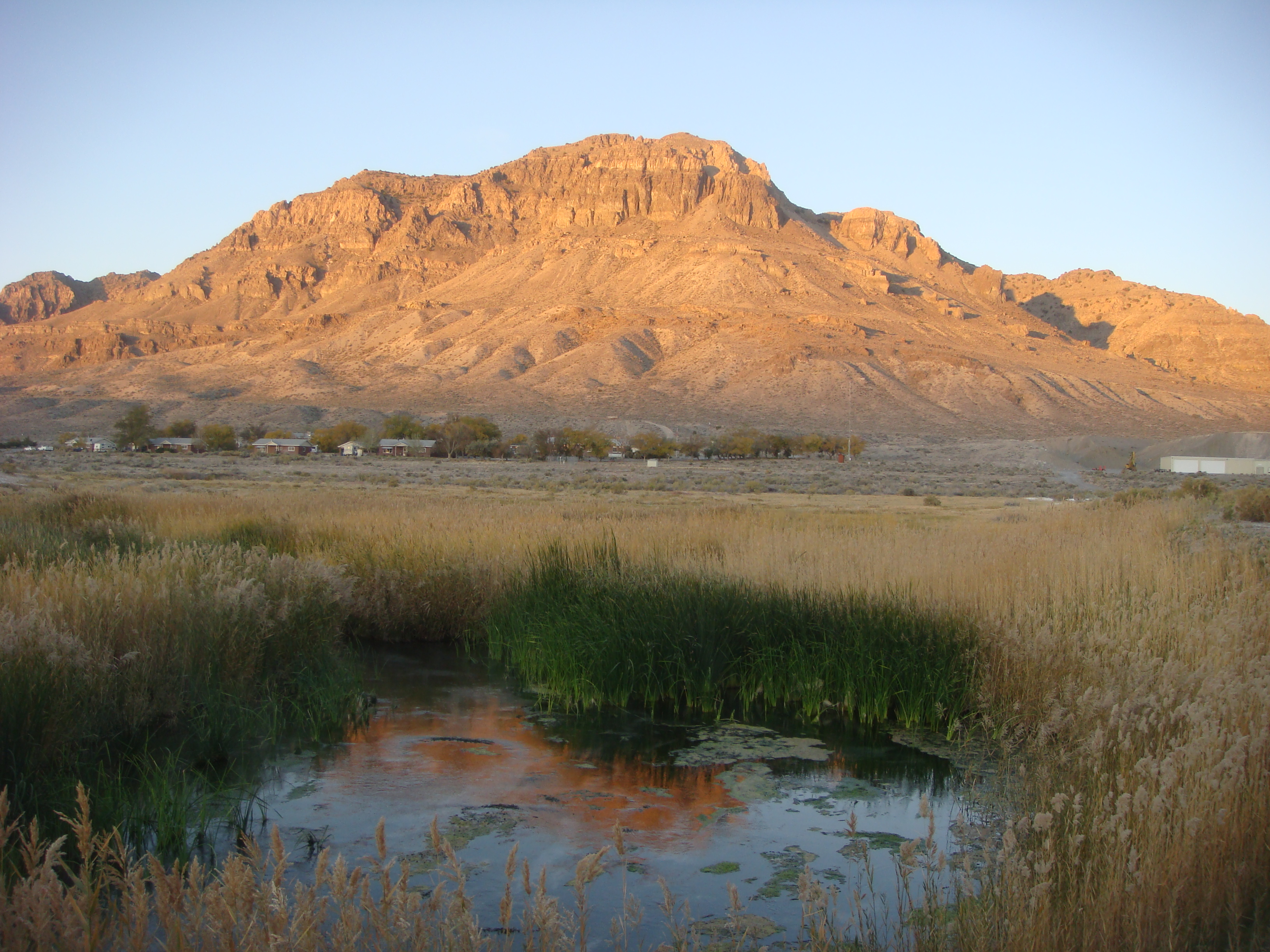
Middle Spring
