= Griggs International Academy =

Location
- Berrien Springs, Michigan; United States; 41°57′30″N 86°21′40″W

Information
- Type: Private
- Denomination: Seventh-day Adventist Church
- Established: 1909
- President: Alayne Thorpe
- Affiliations: Andrews University, Oakwood University, Washington Adventist University
- Website: http://www.griggs.edu

Griggs International Academy is an accredited Seventh-day Adventist distance learning school, offering courses from kindergarten to 12th grade.

== History ==
Founded in 1909 as "The Fireside Correspondence School" and later known as the "Home Study Institute", the school began offering education to those who could not attend traditional schools. Classes were offered from the Seventh-Day Adventist Church headquarters in Washington, D.C., which moved to Silver Spring, Maryland, in the early 20th century. After that, the name was changed to "Home Study International". In July 2011, the school moved to the campus of Andrews University in Berrien Springs, Michigan. It changed its name to Griggs and split into Griggs University (for college courses) and Griggs International Academy (for K-12). Today, more than 235,000 people have studied with Griggs. In 2013, the five bachelor's degrees offered by Griggs University (Religion, Cross-cultural Relations, Human Organization & Behavior, Personal Ministries, and Humanities) were merged into Andrews University's School of Distance Education.

== Frederick Griggs ==
Griggs International Academy is named in honor of Frederick Griggs (1867-1952). Frederick Griggs attended Battle Creek College, the University of Buffalo, and Washington Missionary College. He received the degrees of Bachelor of Arts and Master of Arts, and was a noted Adventist educator. He was principal of the Battle Creek College preparatory department from 1890 to 1899. From 1899 to 1907 he was principal of South Lancaster Academy. He was among the first to develop a normal department for the training of teachers. He was General Conference Educational Secretary from 1903 to 1910 and again from 1914 to 1918. He was president of Union College from 1910 to 1914. Between 1918 and 1925 he was President of Emmanuel Missionary College at Berrien Springs, Michigan (now Andrews University). From 1930 to 1936 he was the field secretary for the Far Eastern Division. From 1930 to 1936 he was president of the Far Eastern Division and from 1936 to 1938 of the China Division. He returned to the United States in 1938. He chaired the Board of Trustees of the College of Medical Evangelists (now Loma Linda University). He also chaired the Pacific Press Publishing Association from 1938 to 1949.
