= Katherine Weimer =

American physicist

Katherine E. M. Weimer
- Born: April 15, 1919; Rutherford, New Jersey, US
- Died: April 23, 2000 (aged 81); Princeton, New Jersey, US
- Education: Ohio State University; Purdue University
- Spouse: Paul K. Weimer
- Scientific career
- Fields: Plasma physics
- Workplaces: Princeton Plasma Physics Laboratory; Princeton University
- Thesis: Artificial Radioactivity of Barium and Lanthanum (1943)
- Doctoral advisor: Marion Llewellyn Pool

Katherine Ella Mounce Weimer (April 15, 1919 – April 23, 2000) was a research physicist at the Princeton Plasma Physics Laboratory at the Princeton University. She is known for her scientific research in the field of plasma magnetohydrodynamic equilibrium and contribution to stability theory of a magnetically confined plasma.

== Education ==
Originally from New Jersey, Weimer received a scholarship to Purdue University and got her B.Sc. in chemistry in 1939. She continued her education at Ohio State University, switching her area of interest from chemistry to physics, and received her Ph.D. in physics in 1943. Her thesis was entitled "Artificial Radioactivity of Barium and Lanthanum" and was supervised by Marion Llewellyn Pool.

Katherine Weimer was the first woman to receive a Ph.D in physics from Ohio State University.

== Scientific career ==
In 1957, Weimer joined the theory group at Princeton Plasma Physics Laboratory. She was the first female research staff member at the laboratory and successfully developed her scientific career for 29 years at PPPL. She conducted fundamental research in the field of plasma equilibrium and magnetohydrodynamic stability in the toroidal magnetic confinement devices, like tokamaks and stellarators. Her work resulted in many important designs of experiments through PPPL, including devices such as the Adiabatic Toroidal Compressor (ATC), Model C Stellarator, and the Poloidal Divertor Experiment (PDX). In 1984, she retired from Princeton University after 29 years at PPPL.

== Scientific legacy ==
The American Physical Society Division of Plasma Physics established the Katherine E. Weimer award in 2001 to "recognize and encourage outstanding achievement in plasma science research by a woman physicist in the early years of her career." The Division of Plasma Physics has historically had lower female representation compared to other divisions, and the award was established to attract and retain more female physicists in the field. The winning physicist receives $4000 and an invitation to speak at the Division of Plasma Physics annual meeting.
