= Fish Springs National Wildlife Refuge =

Wildlife refuge in Juab County, Utah, United States

- IUCN category IV (habitat/species management area)
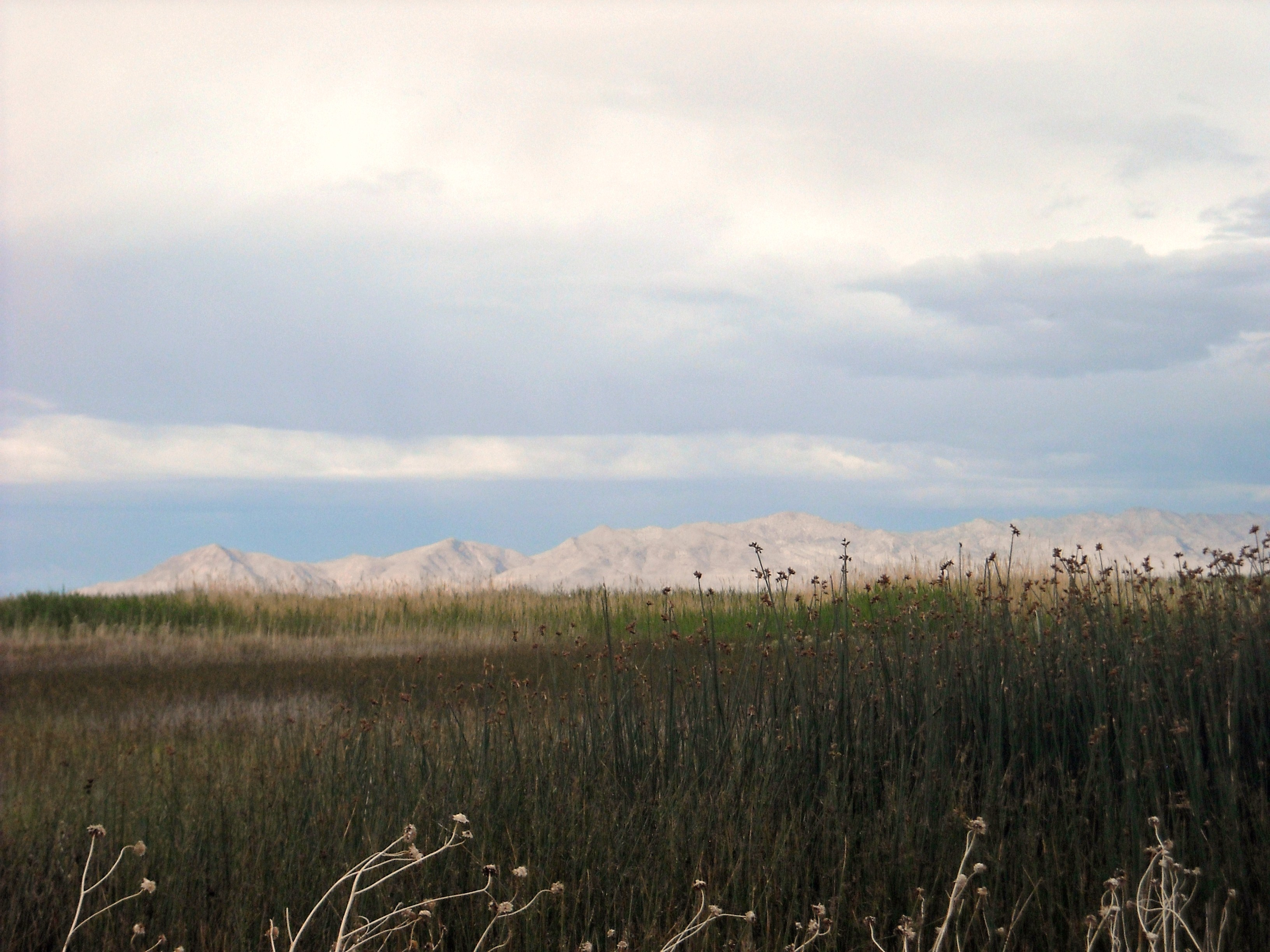
- Marsh land at Fish Springs National Wildlife Refuge

- Location within Utah Location within the United States
- Location: Juab County, Utah, United States
- Nearest city: Dugway, Utah
- Coordinates: 39°51′29″N 113°22′01″W
- Area: 17,992 acres (7,281 ha)
- Established: 1959
- Governing body: U.S. Fish and Wildlife Service
- Website: Fish Springs National Wildlife Refuge

Fish Springs National Wildlife Refuge is at the southern end of the Great Salt Lake Desert, part of the Great Basin in Juab County, Utah, United States. The Refuge is managed by the United States Fish and Wildlife Service. As an oasis in the Great Basin Desert in western Utah, Fish Springs serves a variety of species including fish, migratory birds, deer, coyotes, pronghorn, cougars and other native species. The reserve can be reached by paved road from Lynndyl to Topaz Mountain and then by improved dirt road to the Pony Express Road/Lincoln Highway improved dirt road which runs through the Refuge. The Refuge also is a recreational area for permitted outdoor activities. The Fish Springs Range runs north to south and is immediately west of the Wildlife Refuge.

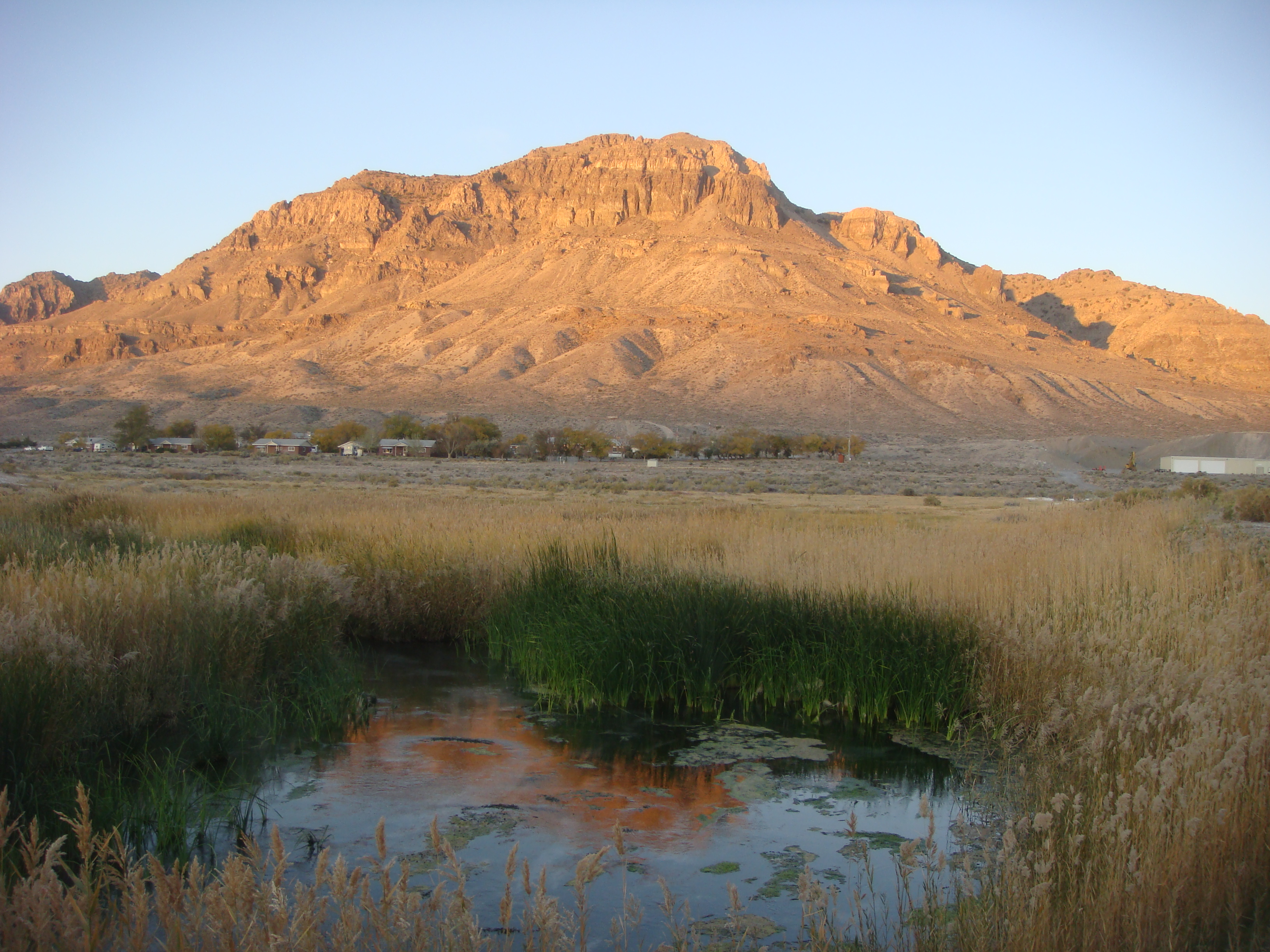
Sunrise at Middle Spring.

Fish Springs started as a Pony Express and Overland Stage station, and got its name from the fish that populated the springs, which were reported to be over 6 inches (15 cm) in length.

The fish are left over from ancient Lake Bonneville which receded about 14,000 years ago. Several natural springs feed the wetlands. These are along a linear path at the range front (that is, fault controlled), and include North Springs, Deadman Springs, House Springs, Middle Springs, Thomas Springs, South Springs, and Percy Springs. Fish Springs is thought to be the end of a long flowpath of groundwater, starting in the Schell Creek Range and Snake Range area and flowing along permeable bedrock (for example, limestones) or faults toward Fish Springs. This comes from the fact the annual discharge of the springs is 27,500 acre-feet (33,900,000 m^{3})/year, and the annual recharge for the drainage area (the range front and Fish Springs Flat) is about 4,000 acre-feet (4,900,000 m^{3})/year, meaning over 6 times more water flows out of the springs than falls in the valley annually by precipitation.

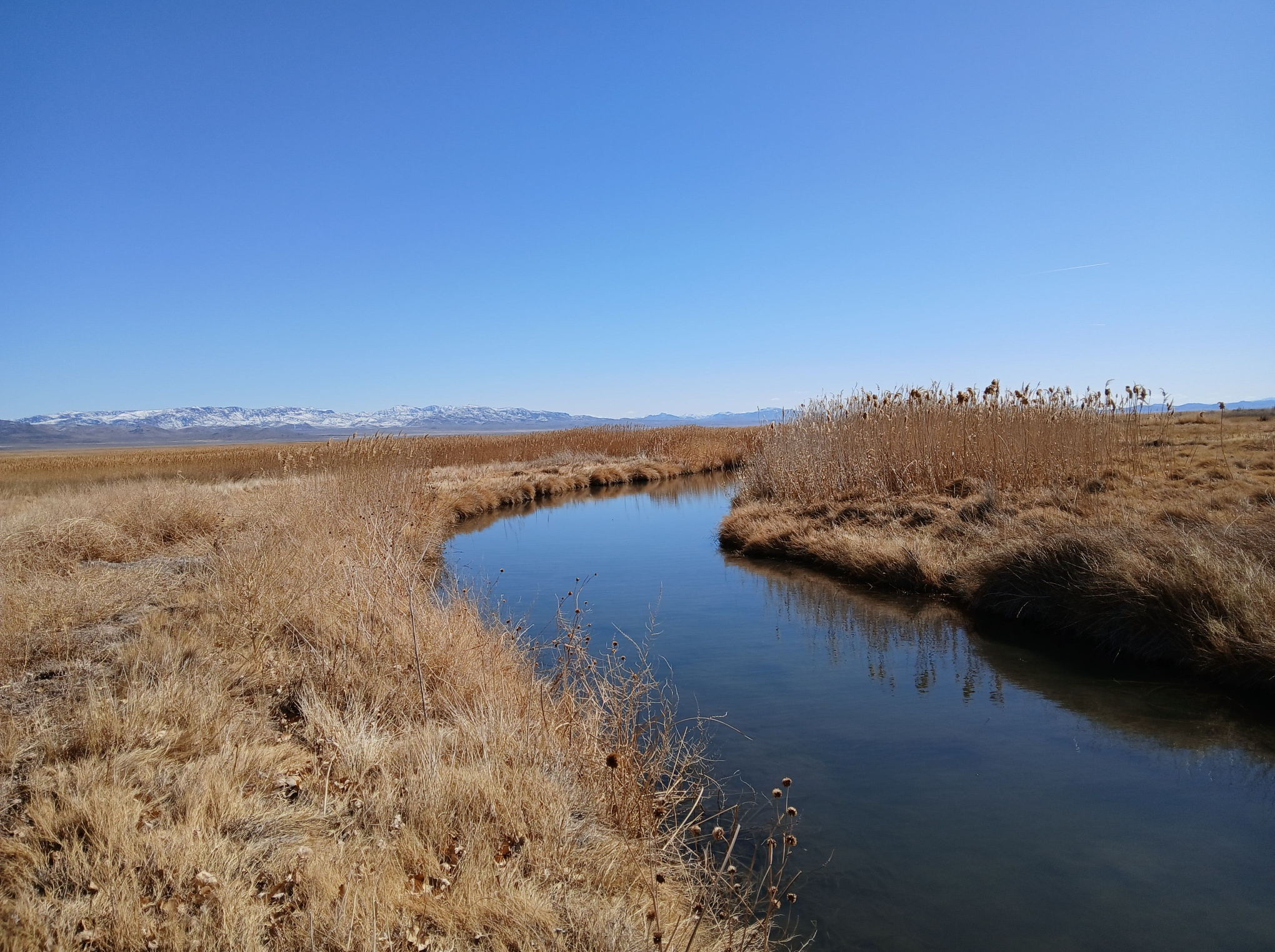
Fish Springs in March

The springs and several wells in the area are monitored by Fish and Wildlife personnel and/or the Utah Geological Survey. The water of Fish Springs is not suited for human consumption, being warm (~80 °F (27 °C)) and highly saline.
