= Weimar, California =

Unincorporated community in California, United States

Weimar
- Unincorporated community
- Location in California Weimar (the United States)
- Coordinates: 39°02′15″N 120°58′21″W
- Country: United States
- State: California
- County: Placer County
- Elevation: 2,257 ft (688 m)
- ZIP code: 95739, 95713
- Area codes: 530, 837
- GNIS feature ID: 237401

Weimar (formerly, "New England Mills" or "Weimer") is an unincorporated community in Placer County, California, located in the Sacramento area. Weimar is located 4.5 miles (7.2 km) south-southwest of Colfax. As of 2020, its population is 339.

== History ==
The Weimar post office opened March 22, 1886. An explanation of the town's name comes from the Geisendorfer family; descendants of George Geisendorfer, founder of the town. George Geisendorfer was born in the area of Weimar, Germany. Many of the original inhabitants of Weimar (New England Mills) were also of German descent. Members of the town, and the Geisendorfer family, have testified that George Geisendorfer himself decided to rename the town “Weimar” when the post office rejected the original name of New England Mills. In April, 1919, in the wake of the end of World War I, a resolution was introduced in the California State Senate to change the town's name to Argonne. The resolution was defeated after the local senator insisted the name was not German, but actually came from Weimah, a chief of the Grass Valley tribe of Southern Paiute Native Americans, who had been hospitable to the area's first white settlers. The senator further stated that postal authorities had misspelled the name.

== Geography ==
By car, Weimar is about 80 minutes from Reno, Nevada and about one hour northeast of Sacramento, California on east I-80. It is directly adjacent to Interstate 80. Amtrak stops at Colfax, California which is about 5 miles east on I-80 past Weimar. The elevation is about 2300–2600 feet.

=== Climate ===
Weimar has a hot-summer Mediterranean climate (Köppen climate classification Csa).

There are cool winters during which intense rainfall with occasional days of snow. It has hot, dry summers with no rainfall in July and August.

Snow in Weimar occasionally falls due to its higher latitude, averaging 10.2 inches or 0.259 metres per year, mostly in winter months.

Average December temperatures are a maximum of 53.0 °F (11.7 °C) and a minimum of 39.0 °F (3.9 °C). Average July temperatures are a maximum of 94.0 °F (34.4 °C) and a minimum of 63.0 °F (17.2 °C). The record high temperature was 113 °F (45 °C). The record low temperature was 20 °F (−7 °C).

Average annual precipitation is 46.9 inches (1,190 mm). There are on average 77.9 days with measurable precipitation.

Weimar's Köppen classification and climate similarities to locations such as Napa, California and parts of Italy make it a suitable region for growing wine grapes. Weimar and the surrounding areas of Placer County are home to over 20 wineries.

Climate data for Weimar, California
Month	Jan	Feb	Mar	Apr	May	Jun	Jul	Aug	Sep	Oct	Nov	Dec	Year
Record high °F (°C)	77.0 (25.0)	80.0 (26.7)	85.0 (29.4)	91.0 (32.8)	102.0 (38.9)	111.0 (43.9)	113.0 (45.0)	112.0 (44.4)	106.0 (41.1)	101.0 (38.3)	87.0 (30.6)	75.0 (23.9)	113.0 (45.0)
Mean daily maximum °F (°C)	53.0 (11.7)	60.0 (15.6)	64.0 (17.8)	70.0 (21.1)	80.0 (26.7)	89.0 (31.7)	94.0 (34.4)	92.0 (33.3)	87.0 (30.6)	77.0 (25.0)	62.0 (16.7)	53.0 (11.7)	73.4 (23.0)
Daily mean °F (°C)	46.0 (7.8)	51.0 (10.6)	54.0 (12.2)	59.0 (15.0)	67.0 (19.4)	74.0 (23.3)	79.0 (26.1)	77.0 (25.0)	73.0 (22.8)	64.0 (17.8)	53.0 (11.7)	46.0 (7.8)	61.9 (16.6)
Mean daily minimum °F (°C)	38.0 (3.3)	42.0 (5.6)	44.0 (6.7)	47.0 (8.3)	53.0 (11.7)	60.0 (15.6)	63.0 (17.2)	62.0 (16.7)	58.0 (14.4)	51.0 (10.6)	44.0 (6.7)	39.0 (3.9)	50.1 (10.1)
Record low °F (°C)	22.0 (−5.6)	21.0 (−6.1)	26.0 (−3.3)	34.0 (1.1)	37.0 (2.8)	46.0 (7.8)	50.0 (10.0)	49.0 (9.4)	42.0 (5.6)	35.0 (1.7)	27.0 (−2.8)	20.0 (−6.7)	20.0 (−6.7)
Average precipitation inches (mm)	7.8 (200)	7.9 (200)	7.0 (180)	3.6 (91)	2.1 (53)	0.6 (15)	0 (0)	0.1 (2.5)	0.8 (20)	2.6 (66)	5.9 (150)	8.5 (220)	46.9 (1,197.5)
Average snowfall inches (cm)	1.3 (3.3)	3.2 (8.1)	2.4 (6.1)	0.5 (1.3)	0 (0)	0 (0)	0 (0)	0 (0)	0 (0)	0 (0)	0.2 (0.51)	2.6 (6.6)	10.2 (25.91)
Average precipitation days	11.6	11.5	10.8	7.9	5	2	0.1	0.7	2.0	4.7	9.7	11.9	77.9
Average snowy days	0.7	1.1	1.1	0.4	0	0	0	0	0	0	0.2	0.4	3.9
Average relative humidity (%)	76.5	67.5	66.5	57.0	47.5	45.0	41.5	45.5	49.0	56.0	67.0	74.0	57.8
Average dew point °F (°C)	38.0 (3.3)	40.0 (4.4)	48.0 (8.9)	43.0 (6.1)	45.0 (7.2)	49.0 (9.4)	50.0 (10.0)	51.0 (10.6)	48.0 (8.9)	46.0 (7.8)	41.0 (5.0)	38.0 (3.3)	44.8 (7.1)
Source 1: Bestplaces.net
Source 2: RAIN and RAINDAYS / SNOW and SNOWDAYS myforecast.co

== Demographics ==
Historical population
Census	Pop.	Note	%±
2010	209		—

Its ZIP code is 95736 and its area code 530.

As of 2010, its population is 209.

== Education ==
The former Weimar Sanitorium, a Tuberculosis treatment hospital, is now Weimar Institute, home to the NEWSTART Lifestyle Program. The institute also includes Weimar College, and Weimar Academy, a boarding school for high school students, both associated with the Seventh-day Adventist Church. It is also home to the Weimar Hills Public School, which offers grades 4th through 8th.
