= Flaming Lotus Girls =

American collaborative art group

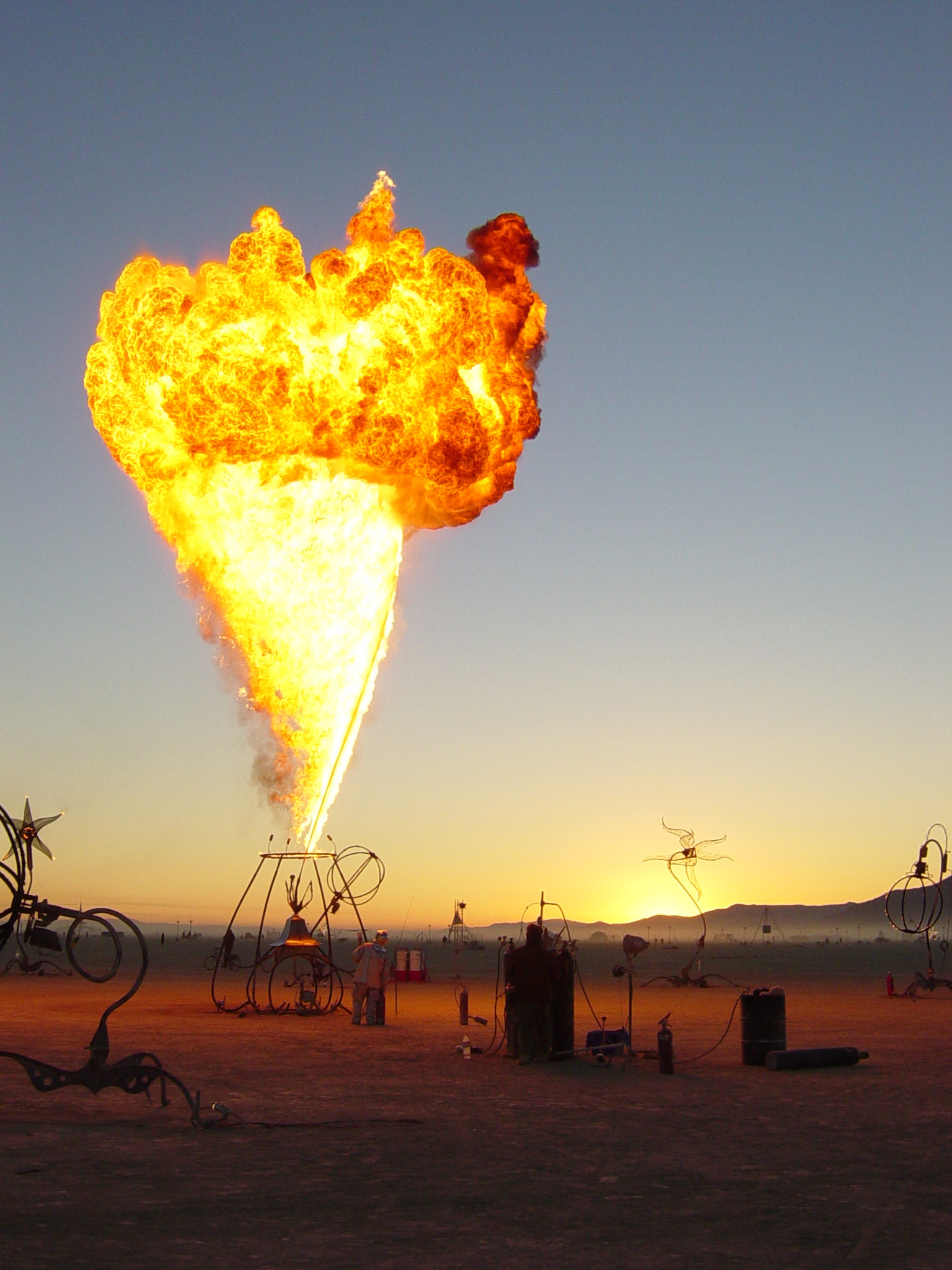
Electra of the Seven Sisters, morning after the Burn, Burning Man 2004

Flaming Lotus Girls (FLG) is a group of volunteer artists who make large-scale kinetic fire art for Burning Man and other outdoor events and spaces. Based in San Francisco, California, FLG has been described as a "women-focused anarchist art collective." As of 2018, the group included over a hundred members of all genders, and a majority of the members were women. Many of the sculptures include robotic art and interactive art elements, allowing the audience to control the lighting, flames, sound, or other effects. The collective's work has appeared throughout the United States, as well as in Canada, Australia, and the Netherlands.

== History ==
The group began in 2000 with several women and men who wanted to teach and gain the fabrication and design experience needed to create large sculptural installations. Early participants included people involved with or influenced by Bay Area art groups and spaces including Survival Research Laboratories, The Crucible, and CELLspace.

The Flaming Lotus Girls were featured in Dust & Illusions (2009), a documentary about the history of Burning Man. Pouneh Mortazavi, Rebecca Anders, Rosa Anna DeFilippis, Caroline Miller, Charlie Gadeken and James Stauffer were the Flaming Lotus Girls members interviewed for the film. The footage features their Serpent Mother sculpture.

== Art ==
=== Early 2000s ===
Created for the 2000 Burning Man Festival, "Flaming Lotus Sr." was a sculptural flame thrower.

In 2001, FLG created "Flaming Flower Garden", a garden of fire that included copper flowers, a lily pond, and a weeping willow.

In 2002 they built multiple sculptures. "Fire Island" had interactive flaming flowers, cacti, arbors and more. "Fire Fan" involved huge plumes of liquid fire controlled by MIDI. The third project was "Mini Mega Jr."

The 2003 project was "The Hand of God", a 12-foot (3.7 m) copper sculpture of a woman's hand that shoots flame from all five fingers.

Created in 2004, "The Seven Sisters" was a collection of seven sculptures approximately 15 feet (4.6 m) in height, representing the stars of the Pleiades constellation. The Seven Sisters include Alcyone, Celano, Maia, Taygeta, Asterope, Merope, and Electra. A Merope rebuild was completed in March 2012, and features CNC plasma-cut stainless steel sides.

=== The Angel of the Apocalypse (2005) ===
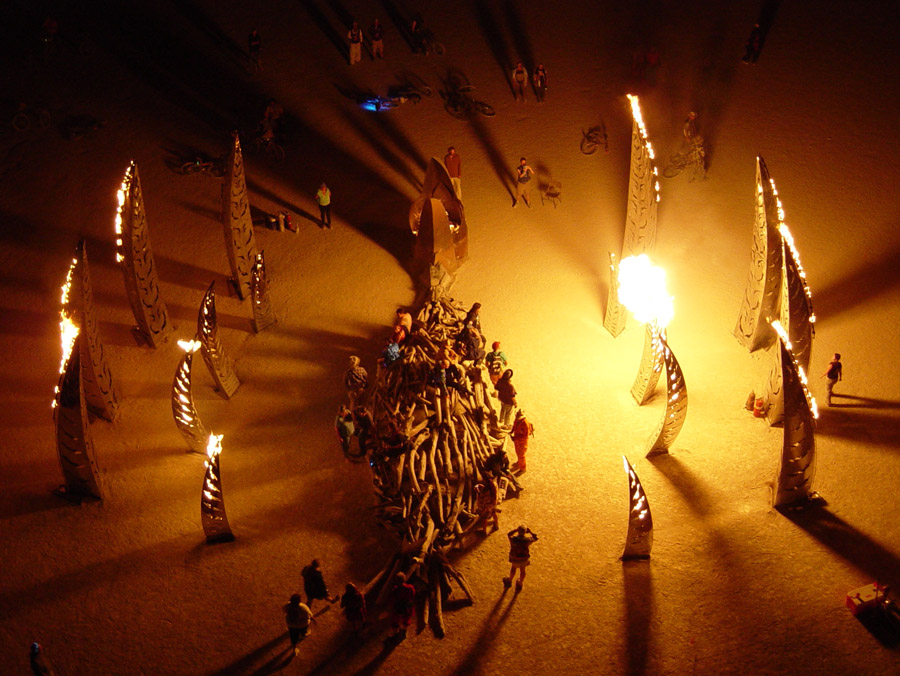
The Angel of the Apocalypse at Burning Man 2005

This sculpture, originally built of steel, driftwood and fire systems, rises from the earth in the form of an abstracted bird. The Angel's wings burn continuously with ambient flame, and each feather features audience-controlled fire effects.

Its head, formed from curved steel plate and featuring hand-blown glass eyes, stands 20 feet (6.1 m) tall and functions as a wood-burning fireplace. Participants are invited to move around and between the Angel's feathers, and to climb and sit atop its driftwood torso.

During its debut appearance at Burning Man, the driftwood torso was burnt as part of the performance. A new steel one was designed and constructed in the winter of 2009–2010, to bring to Toronto's Winter Festival. A pair of interactive feathers were displayed at Maker Faire in San Mateo in 2015 and at an event in Vallejo in 2025.

=== The Serpent Mother (2006) ===
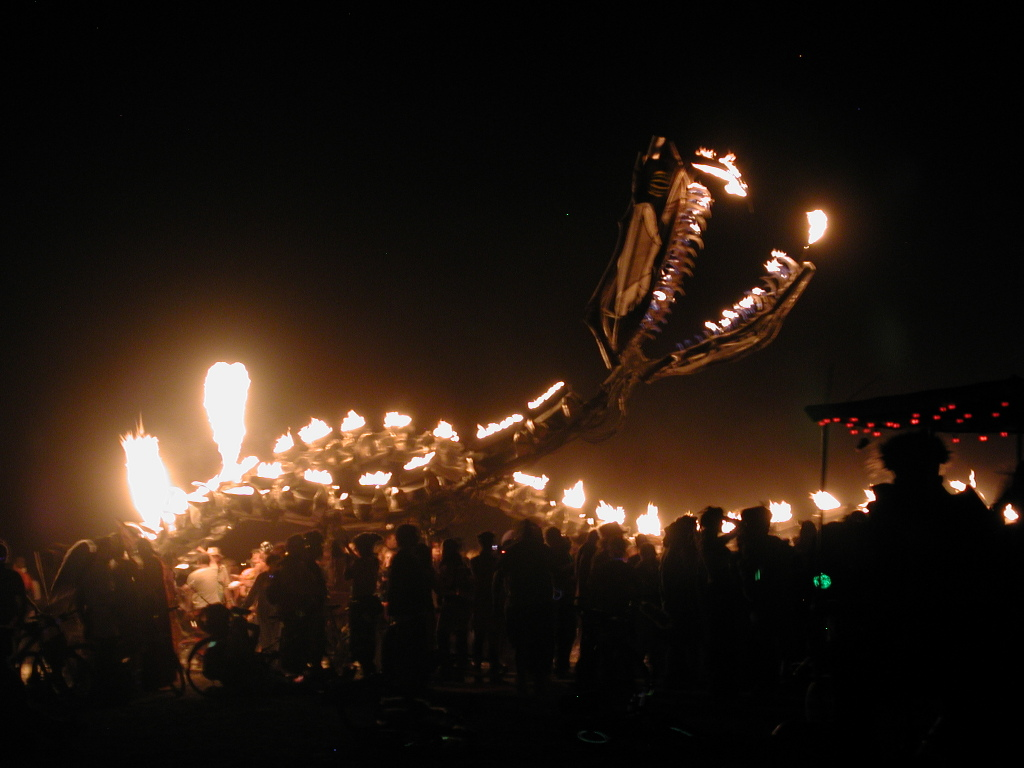
The Serpent Mother

The Serpent Mother is a 168-foot-long (51 m) sculpture of a skeletal serpent coiled around her egg. Serpent Mother has appeared at Electric Daisy Carnival and Coachella in 2012 and Burning Man. In 2017, Serpent Mother was featured at Beakerhead in Calgary. In 2018, Serpent Mother was featured at the White Night Festival in Melbourne, Australia.

=== Mutopia (2008) ===
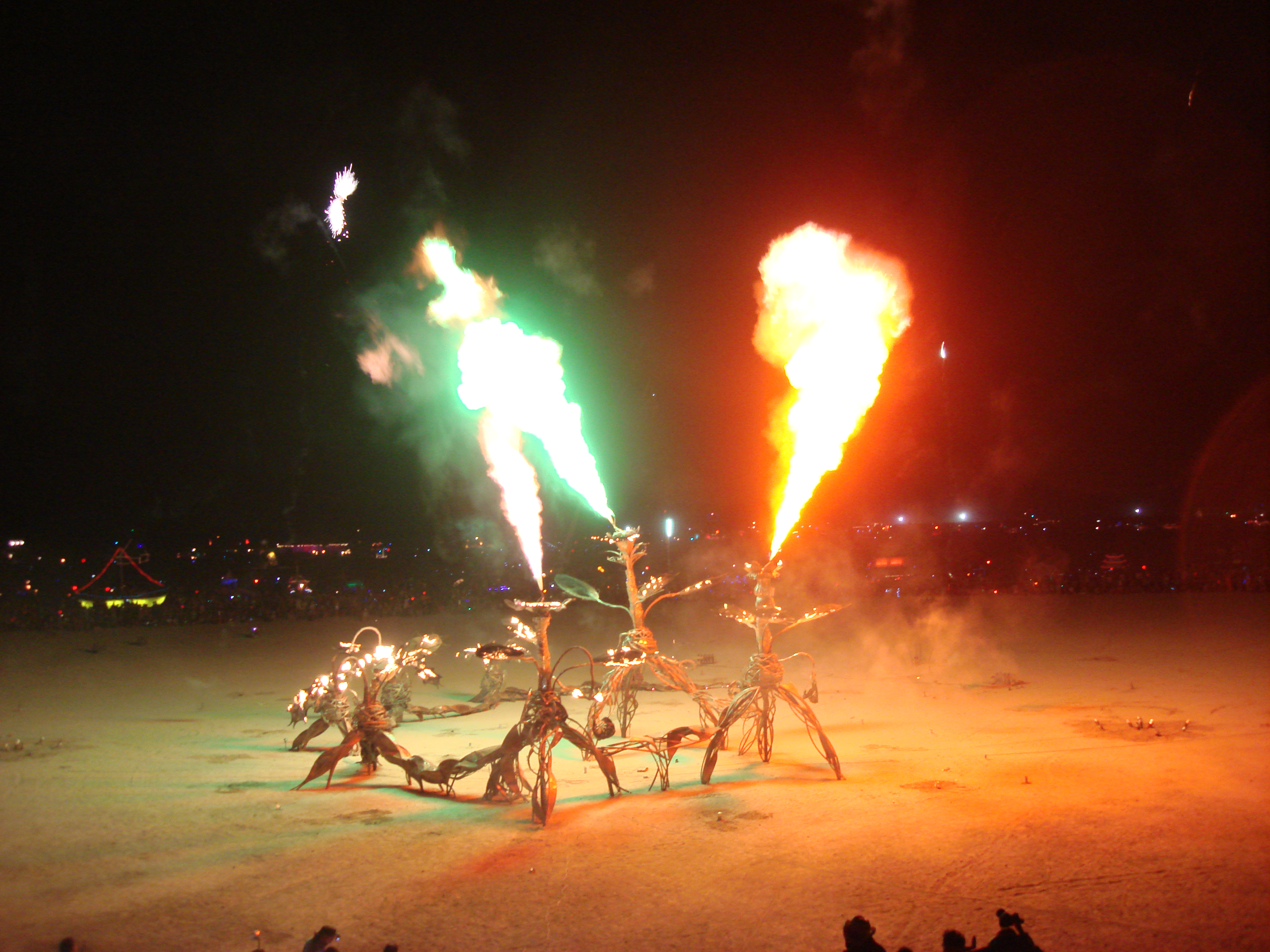
Mutopia methanol shooters, Friday night, Burning Man 2008

Mutopia is a spiraling sculpture of "seedpods," laid out according to the Golden Ratio, a proportion found throughout art and nature. This sculpture was also displayed at Maker Faire Bay Area in 2011.

=== Soma (2009) ===
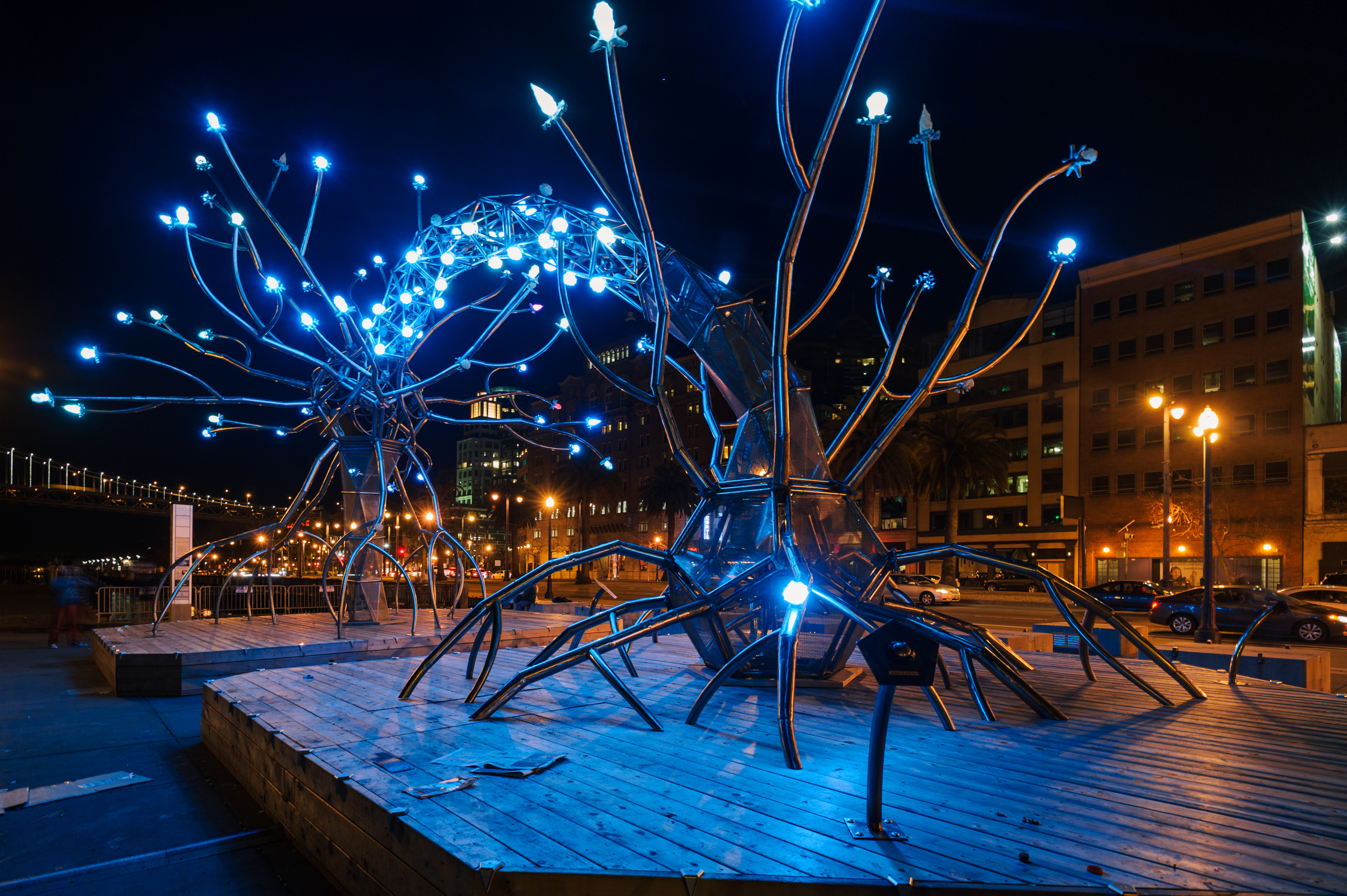
"Soma" sculpture adapted to use LED lights instead of fire, installed in San Francisco as public art, 2015

Soma is a stainless steel neuron that illustrates flowing electricity through crowd-controlled LED light patterns that shoot along its dendrites and axon. Soma appeared at Electric Daisy Carnival in 2013. In 2014 it was installed at Pier 14 along the Embarcadero on the San Francisco waterfront for one year, adapted to light up with LED lights instead of the original balls of fire. In 2016 it moved to Vallejo, California as a public art installation for two years, as part of an effort to draw visitors to the city's downtown and waterfront areas.

=== Tympani Lambada (2011) ===
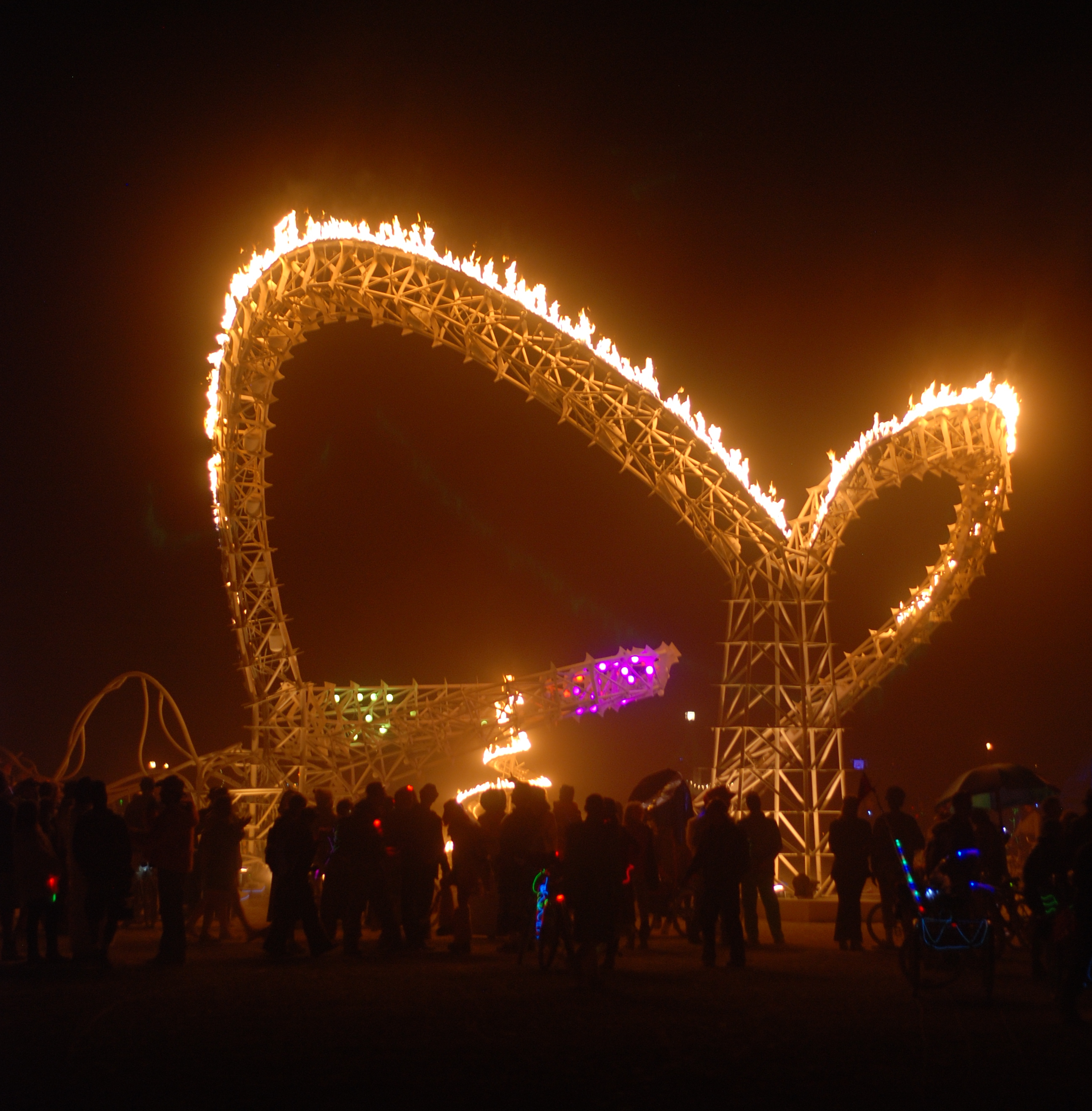
Tympani Lambada at Burning Man 2011

Tympani Lambada is a sculptural representation of the inner ear, with interactive controls for its flames and LED lights. The sculpture is approximately 80 by 40 feet and weighs 20,000-25,000 pounds. The planning and construction of the sculpture involved building large trusses out of pipes that carry propane, linked with 140 joints.

=== Xylophage (2013) ===
Xylophage is a giant sculptural fungi featuring sound, light and fire, sprouting from the remains of an enormous tree. Xylophage appeared at Burning Man in 2013.

=== Pulse (2016) ===
Pulse is an anatomically-correct heart that beats fire through its four chambers, emulating the blood flow through the human heart. The outer steel structure mimics the intricate vasculature and predominant veins and arteries. Above the heart chambers, the aortic arch shoots pulses of fire into the night sky. The sculpture was displayed at the SOMArts Cultural Center in San Francisco in 2016 as part of an event promoting a Flaming Lotus Girls photo calendar.

=== Noetica (2017) ===
Noetica is a set of two sculptures constructed from 144 stainless steel squares carved with intricate patterns. The larger of the two sculptures is hydraulically powered - and may be controlled by manually manipulating the smaller sculpture. Noetica was displayed in Black Rock City, NV in 2017.

=== Serenity (2019) ===
Serenity is a 2019 Black Rock City Honoraria project. It features a group of three giant fireflies, and many smaller fireflies, escaping the pieces of a large broken jar. Serenity is sculpted in steel and features interactive flame and LED effects at night. It debuted at Burning Man in August 2019.

=== Sea of Dreams (2022) ===
Sea of Dreams is a 2022 Black Rock City Honoraria project. Sea of Dreams is an immersive sculptural landscape featuring origami boats bound for a magical island of fiery plants and mystical origami cranes.

=== Mutopia Evolution (2023) ===
Mutopia Evolution was an art installation at Burning Man in 2023.
