= Sturtz =

Sturtz is a surname of Germanic origin and has also been called Pennsylvania Dutch. The proper German spelling is Stürtz. The Sturtz name evolved from Stötz, also of Germanic origin.

In the United States, Sturtzs mostly live in the states of New York, Ohio, Pennsylvania, and Iowa.

== Notable people ==
- Dale Sturtz (1938–2015), American politician
- Emil Stürtz (1892–c. 1945), German Nazi Party official and politician
- Michael Sturtz (born 1969), American sculptor, designer, consultant, speaker and innovator
