= Volcano Peak (Utah) =

Mountain summit in Tooele County, Utah, United States

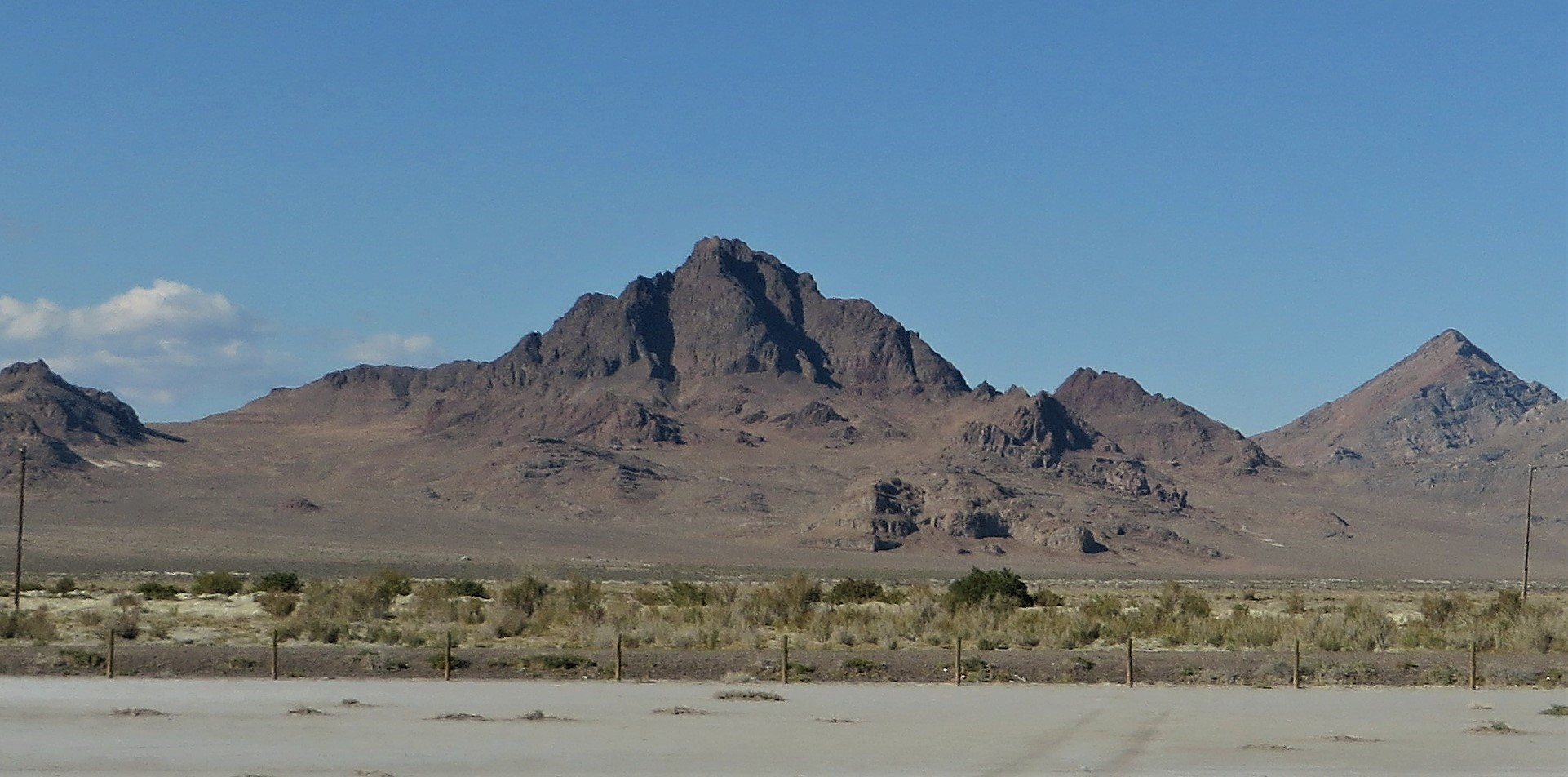
- South aspect, from Bonneville Salt Flats

Highest point
- Elevation: 6,011 ft (1,832 m)
- Prominence: 931 ft (284 m)
- Parent peak: Rishel Peak (6,212 ft)
- Isolation: 1.88 mi (3.03 km)
- Coordinates: 40°47′44″N 113°58′38″W

Geography
- Location within Utah Location within the United States
- Location: Great Salt Lake Desert
- Country: United States of America
- State: Utah
- County: Tooele
- Parent range: Silver Island Mountains; Great Basin Ranges
- Topo map: USGS Tetzlaff Peak

Geology
- Rock type: Rhyolite porphyry

Climbing
- Easiest route: class 3 scrambling

Volcano Peak is a 6,011-foot elevation (1,832 m) mountain summit located in Tooele County, Utah, United States.

== Description ==
Volcano Peak is situated in the Silver Island Mountains which are a subset of the Great Basin Ranges, and it is set on land managed by the Bureau of Land Management. The community of Wendover, Utah, is six miles (9.7 km) to the southwest and line parent Rishel Peak is two miles (3.2 km) to the northeast. Topographic relief is modest as the summit rises 1,800 feet (550 meters) above the Bonneville Salt Flats in 1.5 mile. This landform's toponym has been officially adopted by the U.S. Board on Geographic Names.

== Climate ==
Volcano Peak is set in the Great Salt Lake Desert which has hot summers and cold winters. The desert is an example of a cold desert climate as the desert's elevation makes temperatures cooler than lower elevation deserts. Due to the high elevation and aridity, temperatures drop sharply after sunset. Summer nights are comfortably cool. Winter highs are generally above freezing, and winter nights are bitterly cold, with temperatures often dropping well below freezing.

== Gallery ==
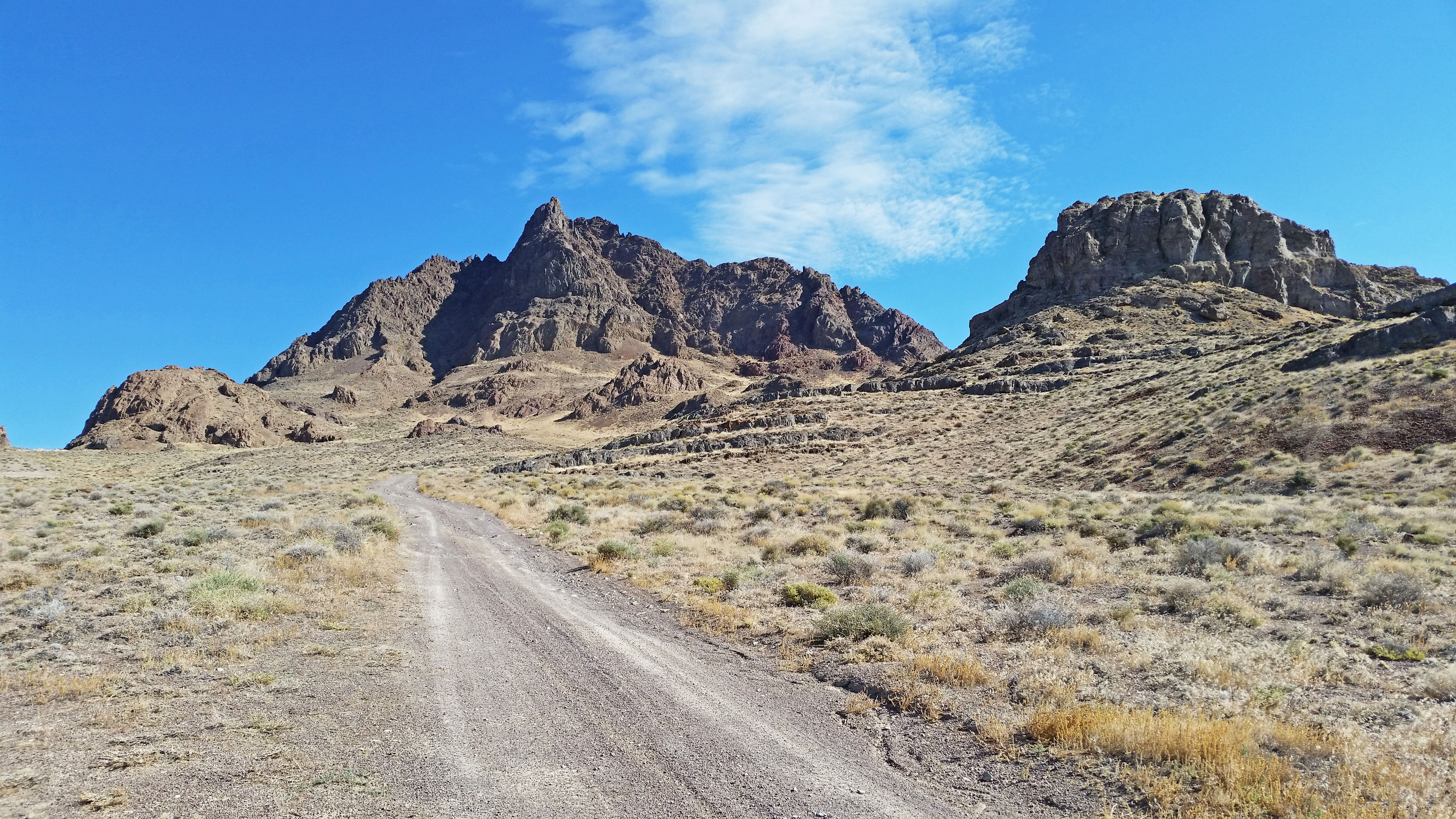

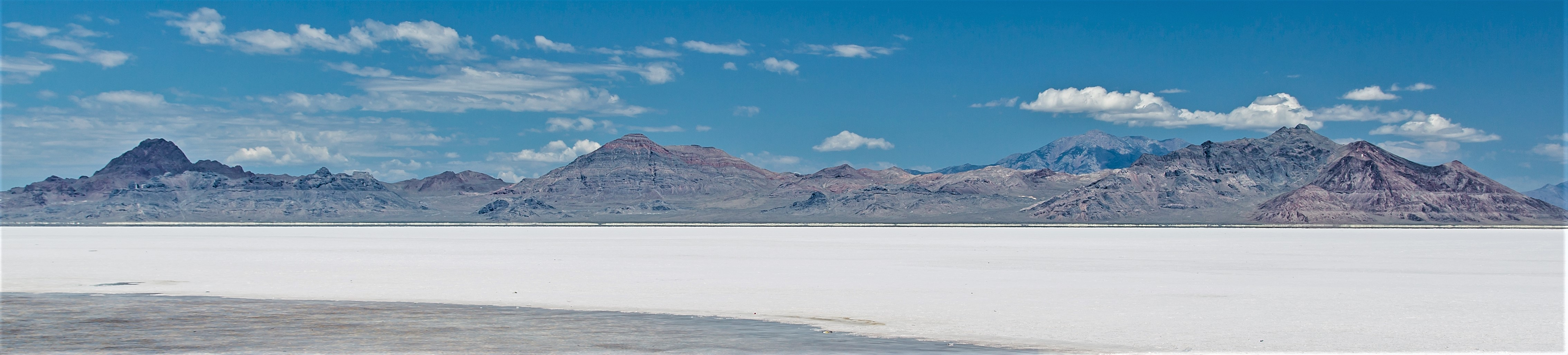
Volcano Peak (left), Rishel Peak (left of center) and Tetzlaff Peak (right) from Bonneville Salt Flats

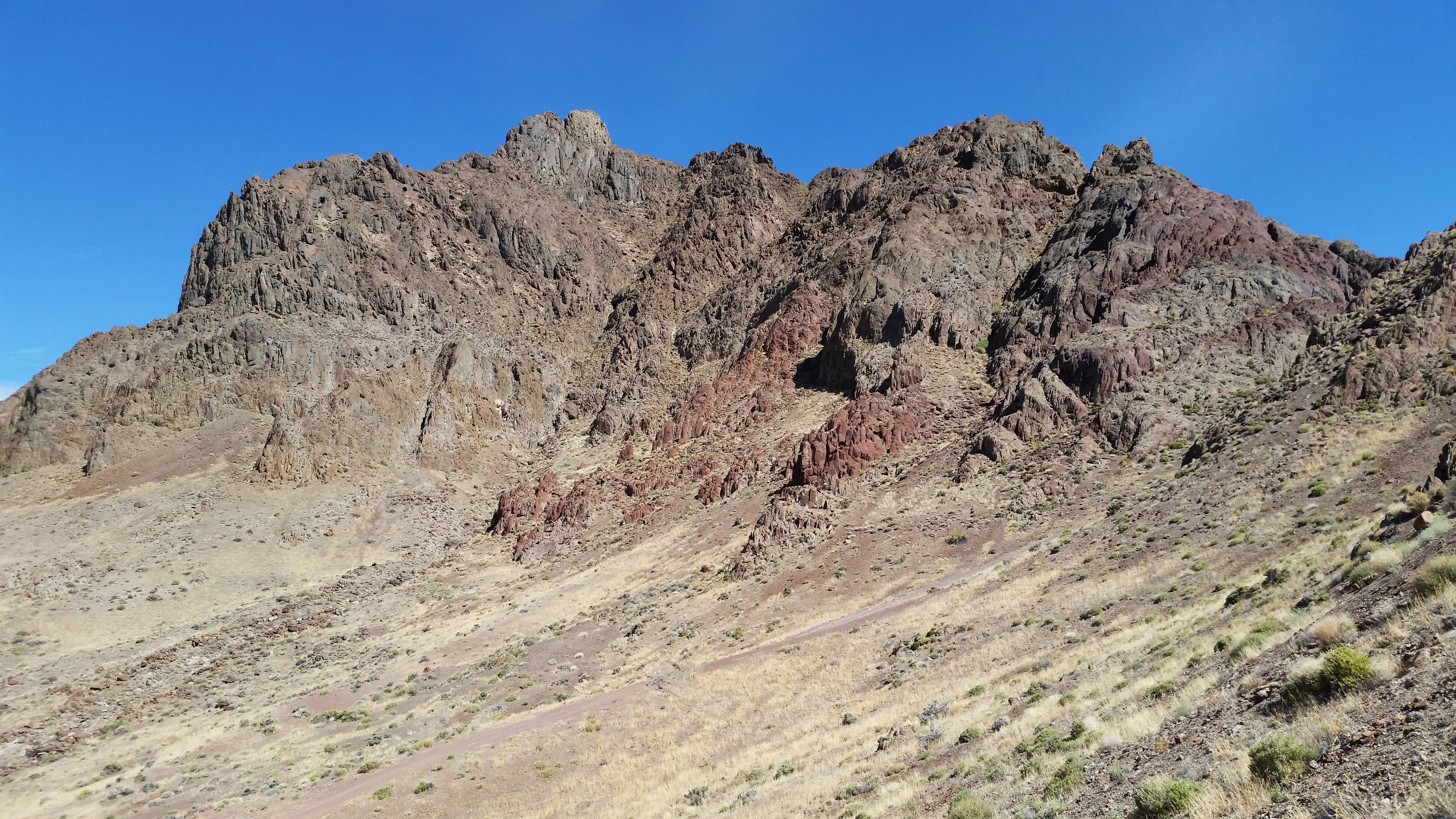

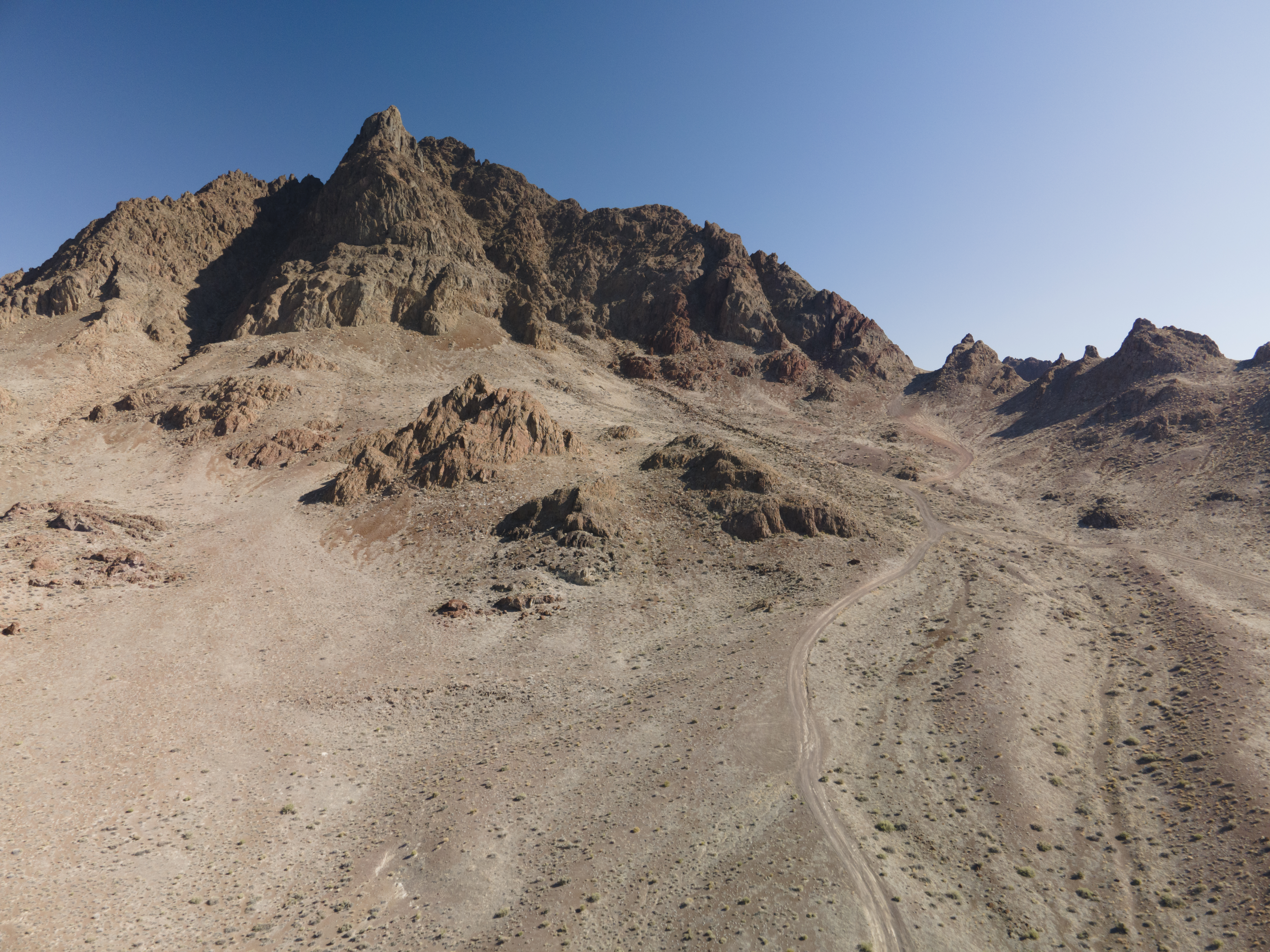
Southwest slope

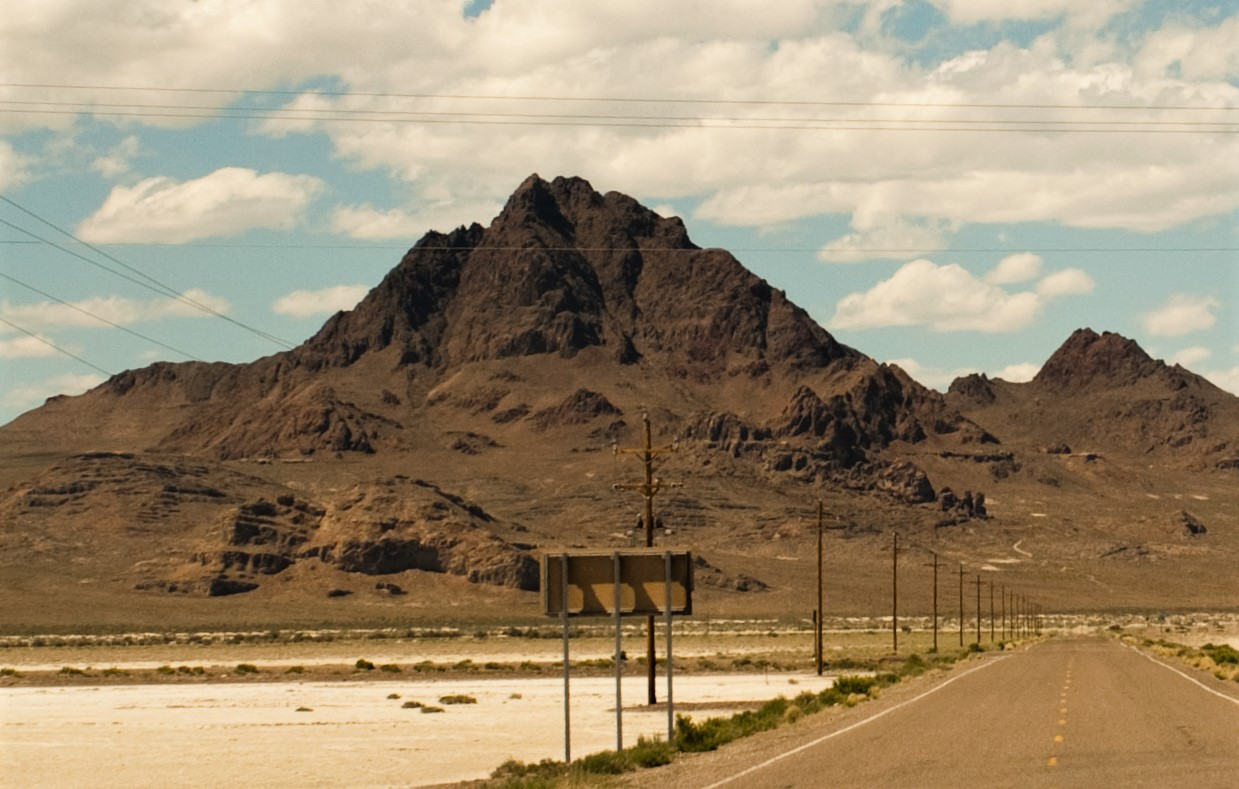
South aspect

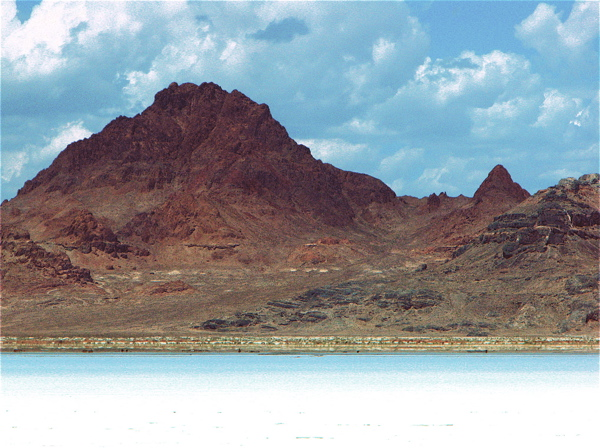

== See also ==
- List of mountain peaks of Utah
