= Michael Sturtz =

American sculptor and arts educator

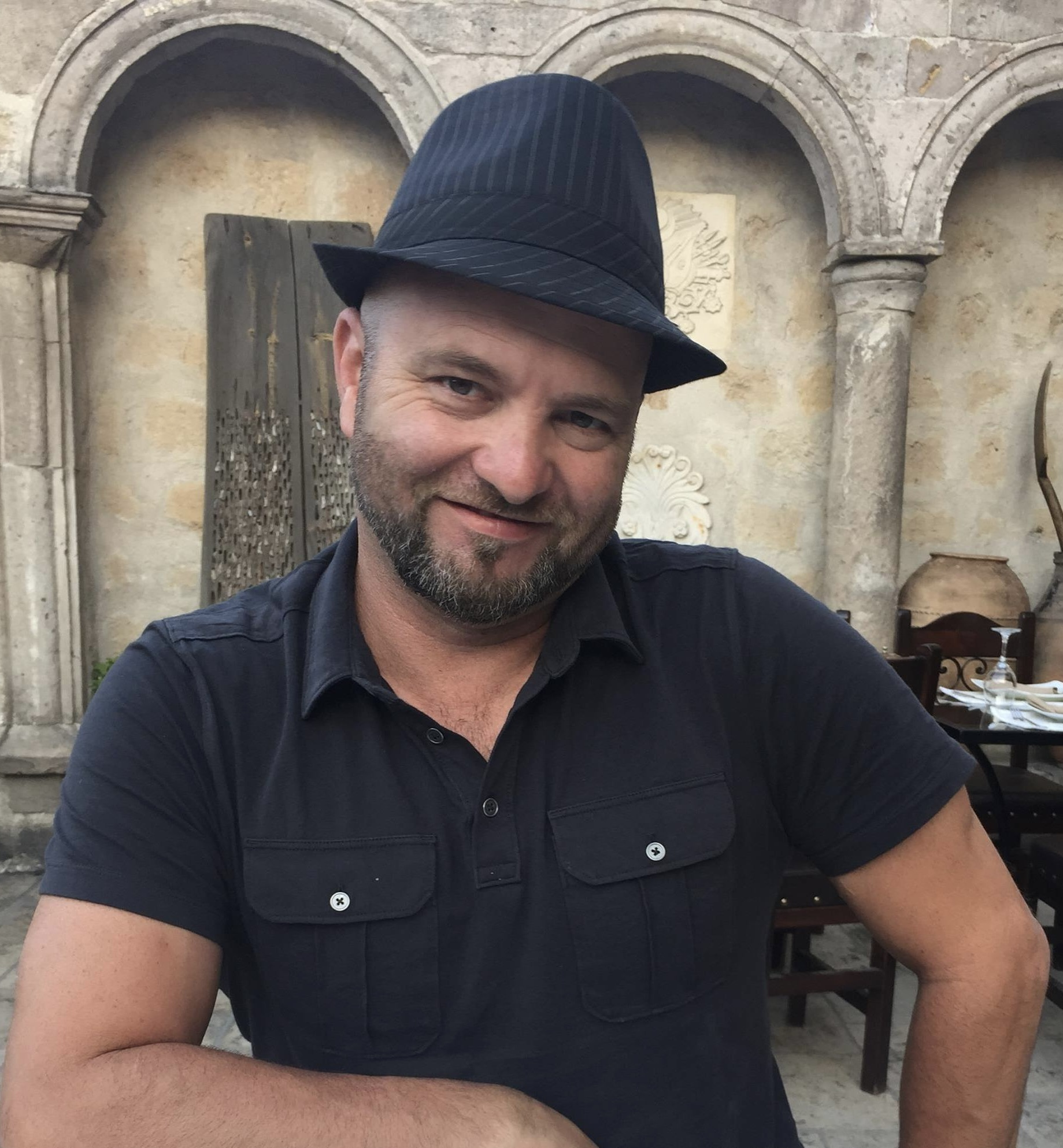
Michael Sturtz

Michael Sturtz (born May 17, 1969 in Walnut Creek, CA) is a sculptor, designer, consultant, international speaker, innovator and facilitator of creative thinking. He is the founder of The Crucible, a nonprofit industrial arts school in Oakland, California, United States, and served as its executive director from 1999 to 2011.

Sturtz joined Stanford University's d.school in 2012, where he spearheaded a new artistic genre of live performance as director of the ReDesigning Theater Project. In 2014, Sturtz founded Stanford's Creative Ignition Lab at Autodesk in San Francisco. This new lab explored the potential for visual, experiential, and embodied thinking to unlock the future of making and learning. While at Autodesk, Michael joined the Applied Research & Innovation team at Pier 9, where he helped innovate new ways to utilize machine learning within robotic welding.

In 2017 and 2018, Michael led the prototyping lab at Google X, where he led his own moonshot investigation and collaborated to pioneer the future of automated manufacturing.

== Early life and education ==
Sturtz grew up tinkering with machines and from a very young age could be found rebuilding cars in his stepfather's auto body shop, where he developed an affinity for metal and machinery. Always fascinated with the elegance and intricacies of how things worked, he would spend hot summer afternoons dissecting road kill and later observe his father, an orthopedic surgeon, in the operating room. As a result, he developed a fascination for the hidden mechanics of everyday forms.

Sturtz received his Bachelor of Fine Arts from the Alfred University School of Art and Design and his Master of Fine Arts from The School of the Art Institute of Chicago. He also studied stone carving at the studio of Sem Ghelardini, in Pietrasanta, Italy.

His work often combines organic themes with metal and machinery. Sturtz states that his artwork "showcases a strong juxtaposition between materials including metals and glass, stone and kinetics, fire and liquid, 3D objects and video." His sculptural works are exhibited extensively in collections throughout the US, Italy and England.

== The Crucible ==
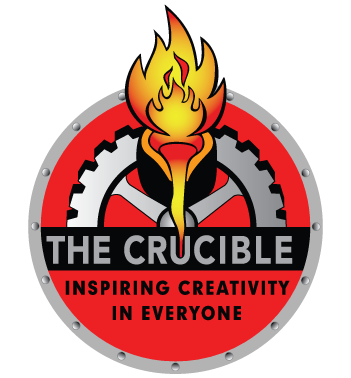
The Crucible is a 501(c)(3) non-profit arts education organization that fosters a collaboration of arts, industry, and community.

In 1999, Sturtz founded The Crucible, a non-profit regional art center in Oakland, CA, where industrial arts are taught in a creative and non-competitive learning environment. Sturtz's goal was to break down barriers to the arts by creating an art school that emphasized non-competitive learning and participation.

During his 12 years as executive director, Sturtz nurtured what began as an idea and a $1,750 seed grant into the largest nonprofit industrial arts educational facility in the nation. Sturtz designed The Crucible's facilities and programs, and then led a staff and faculty of 100+ in the build-out of a 56,000 square foot industrial arts facility where over 8,000 students would attend every year. The Crucible welcomes 20,000 visitors per year to participate in adult art education, youth programs, community outreach, corporate workshops, and open house events.

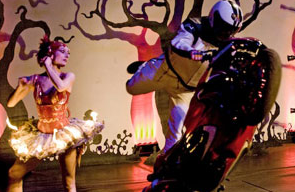
The Crucible's Firebird Ballet

During his tenure as The Crucible's executive director, Sturtz developed a reputation for innovative projects. He produced and directed large-scale theatrical events and festivals which melded the classical and industrial arts, in The Crucible's Fire Operas, Fire Ballets and Fire Arts Festivals.

== Stanford ==
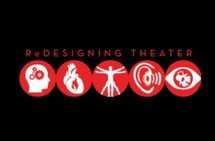
reDesigning Theater

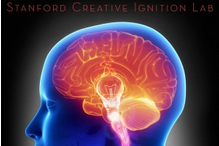
The Stanford CI Lab @ Autodesk

Sturtz retired from The Crucible on January 15, 2011, to join Stanford University, accepting a teaching appointment in the Mechanical Engineering Design Group. He went on to teach at The Stanford School of Design, where he spearheaded and then directed the ReDesigning Theater Project, a creative program focusing on cutting edge live performance appealing to the 21- to 35-year-old demographic.

In 2014, Sturtz became the executive director of The Stanford Creative Ignition Lab @ Autodesk. The lab explored the potential for visual, experiential, and embodied thinking to advance the future of learning, design, and making. The program's aim was to pioneer new ways to more purposefully bring the tools of invention and production seamlessly into creative processes.

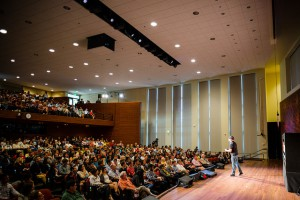
TEDx - Above and Beyond

Sturtz participated in TEDx Stanford's "Above and Beyond" series, to speak about finding your creative voice and harnessing your creativity.

== World land speed record for biodiesel motorcycle ==
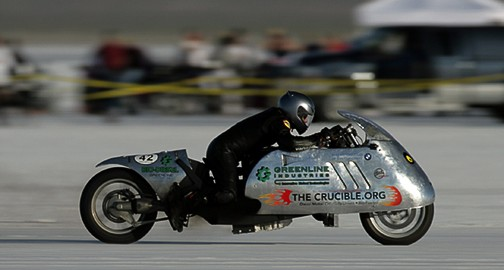
On September 3, 2007 Michael rode Die Moto at the Bonneville Salt Flats, breaking the world land speed record using 100% biodiesel.

Die Moto is the world's first biodiesel land speed motorcycle. It was built in 2006 by Sturtz and The Diesel Dozen, a team of artists, builders, engineers and gearheads who shared the common goal of constructing a biodiesel bike that could beat the existing diesel motorcycle world land speed record of 105 mph. Die Moto combines a BWM chassis with a car engine and a hand-tooled retro fairing. Sturtz and the team worked for nearly one year, overcoming engineering challenges and garnering sponsorships and media interest.

On September 3, 2007 Sturtz piloted the custom-built biodiesel motorcycle Die-Moto at the Bonneville Salt Flats, setting the world motorcycle land speed record at 130.614 MPH, using 100% biodiesel. The event was the first non-petroleum powered motorcycle to ever run at Bonneville, and set the world record running on Greenline Industries B100 biodiesel fuel.

The world land speed record remains unbroken.

== International speaker and consultant ==
Sturtz is an international speaker and consultant specializing in innovative thought leadership, organizational development, and creative empowerment. He is currently pioneering the concept of "indigeny", a state of life that seeks healthy harmony and balance with the human body and Earth's natural systems. Indigeny draws inspiration and guidance from indigenous cultures, while harnessing innovative environmental technology to build a new model of living on the planet that would make our existing model obsolete.
