= Keith Bulen =

American politician (1925–1999)

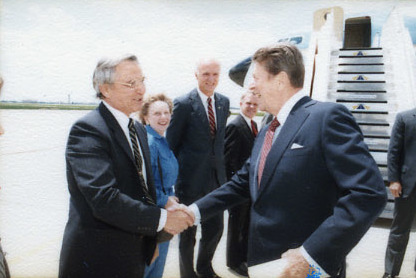
- Bulen greeting President Ronald Reagan in 1985

Member of the Indiana House of Representatives from the 52nd district
- In office November 7, 1990 – November 4, 1992
- Preceded by: Eugene Raymond Leeuw
- Succeeded by: W. Dale Sturtz

Member of the Indiana House of Representatives from Marion County
- In office November 9, 1960 – November 4, 1964
- Preceded by: Multi-member district
- Succeeded by: Multi-member district

Personal details
- Born: December 31, 1925
- Died: January 4, 1999 (aged 73)
- Party: Republican
- Education: Indiana University; Ohio State University

Lawrence Keith Bulen (December 31, 1925 – January 4, 1999), widely known as "L. Keith Bulen", was an Indiana politician.

== Political career ==
As a deputy prosecutor under Marion County Prosecutor "Honest John" Tinder (1955-1963), Bulen was fired after being accused of fixing a case implicating Indianapolis racketeer Tuffy Mitchell.

Bulen was later elected to the Indiana House of Representatives in 1960 and was re-elected in 1962 from the westside of Indianapolis. The 1964 Presidential Campaign, with its heavy Republican losses, became a rallying point for dissenting Republicans in central Indiana. Bulen and three others helped to overthrow the Republican establishment in Marion County. He became the first paid Chairman of the Marion County Republican Central Committee in 1966, where he remained until 1970.

Bulen was considered the leading prospect to head a reorganized Republican National Committee: "Bulen is highly regarded in the National Committee, a strong and thorough organizer; he has proven himself tough enough to move a lot of people around and break some china, yet maintains a strong respect, even among those whom he has offended. He has been through a similar exercise to that we are facing in his own state of Indiana, and is therefore aware of some of the problems that might not be apparent to others. Most important, he could be counted upon to be totally loyal," wrote John Sears.

From 1972 to 1974, Bulen was chairman of the board of Campaign Communicators, Inc. (CCI), a campaign onsulting firm. CCI hired a future Indiana Governor, Mitch Daniels—a vice president at CCI—who moved back and forth, like Bulen, between the consulting firm and the unsuccessful Richard Lugar for Senate campaign in 1974. After a fundraising trip to Indianapolis that October by President Gerald R. Ford, Bulen resigned from all of his political positions and in late-December 1974 shut down CCI weeks after Daniels was hired by Lugar's mayoral office. These changes came amidst news reports that a Federal corruption investigation was focused on Bulen's law firm. The story was front page news the next month, as well: "[T]he FBI is conducting an investigation for possible violations of fraud and of the Hobbes Act, and Federal corrupt-practices statues" related to the distribution of liquor licenses in the expanded City-controlled geography created by Unigov.

John Sears suggested Bulen run the national party for Nixon in 1968. Though the pair knew each other by the time of the 1968 Nixon campaign, they may have met when Sears was at the University of Notre Dame, graduating in either 1960 or 1961.

== Horse racing and breeding ==
Bulen was the leader of and Hall of Fame inductee for the Indiana Standard Bred Association. He was the co-owner of Abercrombie, the world champion pacer.

== Legacy ==
The "Bulen Symposium on American Politics" is hosted by Indiana University–Purdue University Indianapolis. Throwing Chairs and Raising Hell: Politics in the Keith Bulen Era is a book about Bulen.
