= Rishel Peak =

Mountain in Utah, United States

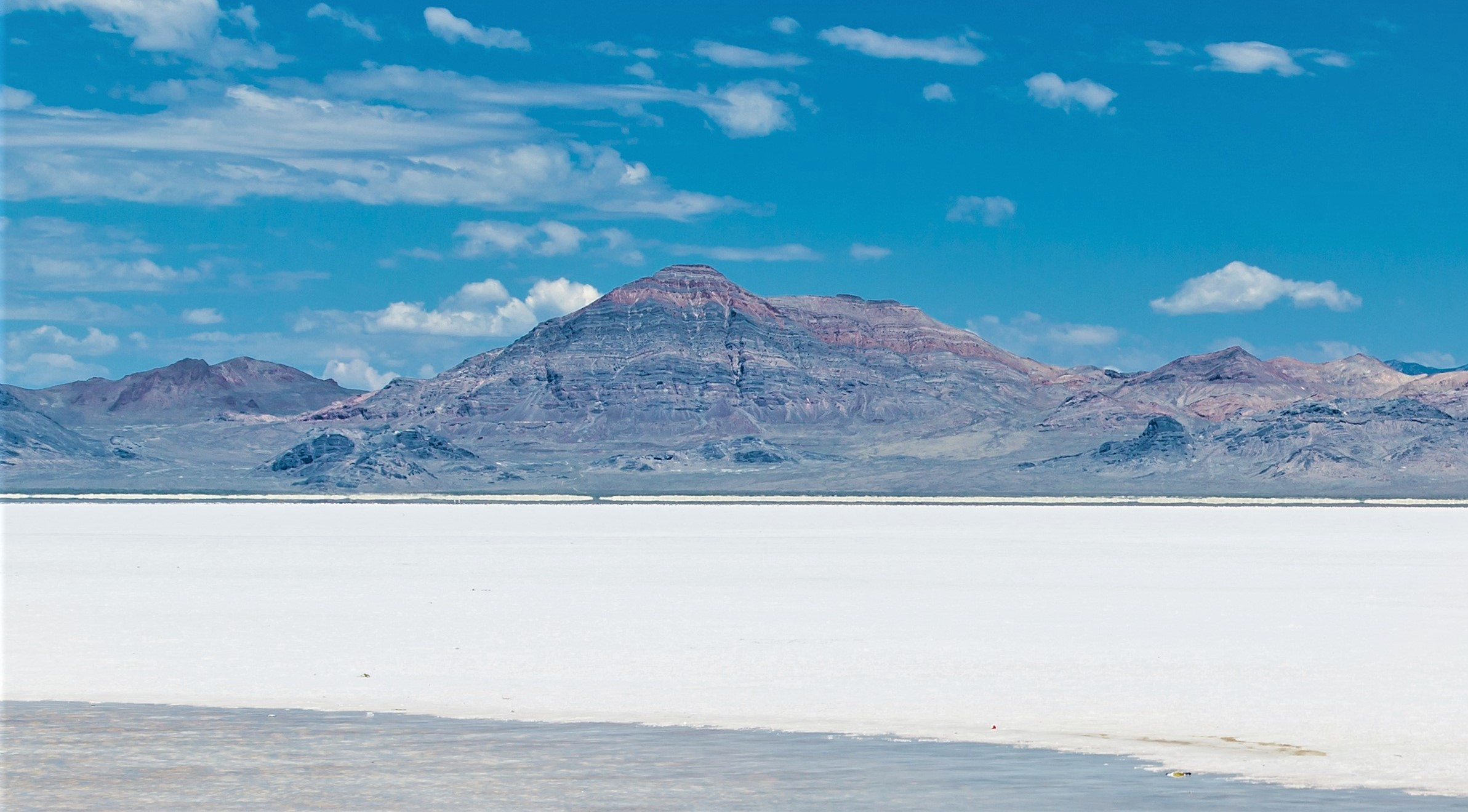
- South aspect, from Bonneville Salt Flats

Highest point
- Elevation: 6,212 ft (1,893 m)
- Prominence: 852 ft (260 m)
- Parent peak: Tetzlaff Peak (6,267 ft)
- Isolation: 2.65 mi (4.26 km)
- Coordinates: 40°49′00″N 113°57′18″W

Naming
- Etymology: William David "Bill" Rishel

Geography
- Location within Utah Location within the United States
- Location: Great Salt Lake Desert
- Country: United States of America
- State: Utah
- County: Tooele
- Parent range: Silver Island Mountains; Great Basin Ranges
- Topo map: USGS Tetzlaff Peak

Geology
- Rock age: Cambrian
- Mountain type: Fault block
- Rock type: Limestone

Climbing
- Easiest route: class 2 hiking

Rishel Peak is a 6,212-foot elevation (1,893 m) mountain summit located in Tooele County, Utah, United States.

== Description ==
Rishel Peak is situated in the Silver Island Mountains which are a subset of the Great Basin Ranges, and it is set on land managed by the Bureau of Land Management. The community of Wendover, Utah, is eight miles to the southwest and the Bonneville Speedway is seven miles to the east-southeast. Topographic relief is significant as the summit rises 2,000 feet (610 meters) above the Bonneville Salt Flats in 1.5 mile. This landform's toponym was officially adopted in 1960 by the U.S. Board on Geographic Names to honor William D. "Bill" Rishel (1869–1947), who in 1907 was the first to test the suitability of the salt flat for driving by taking a Pierce-Arrow onto its surface.

== Climate ==
Rishel Peak is set in the Great Salt Lake Desert which has hot summers and cold winters. The desert is an example of a cold desert climate as the desert's elevation makes temperatures cooler than lower elevation deserts. Due to the high elevation and aridity, temperatures drop sharply after sunset. Summer nights are comfortably cool. Winter highs are generally above freezing, and winter nights are bitterly cold, with temperatures often dropping well below freezing.

== Gallery ==
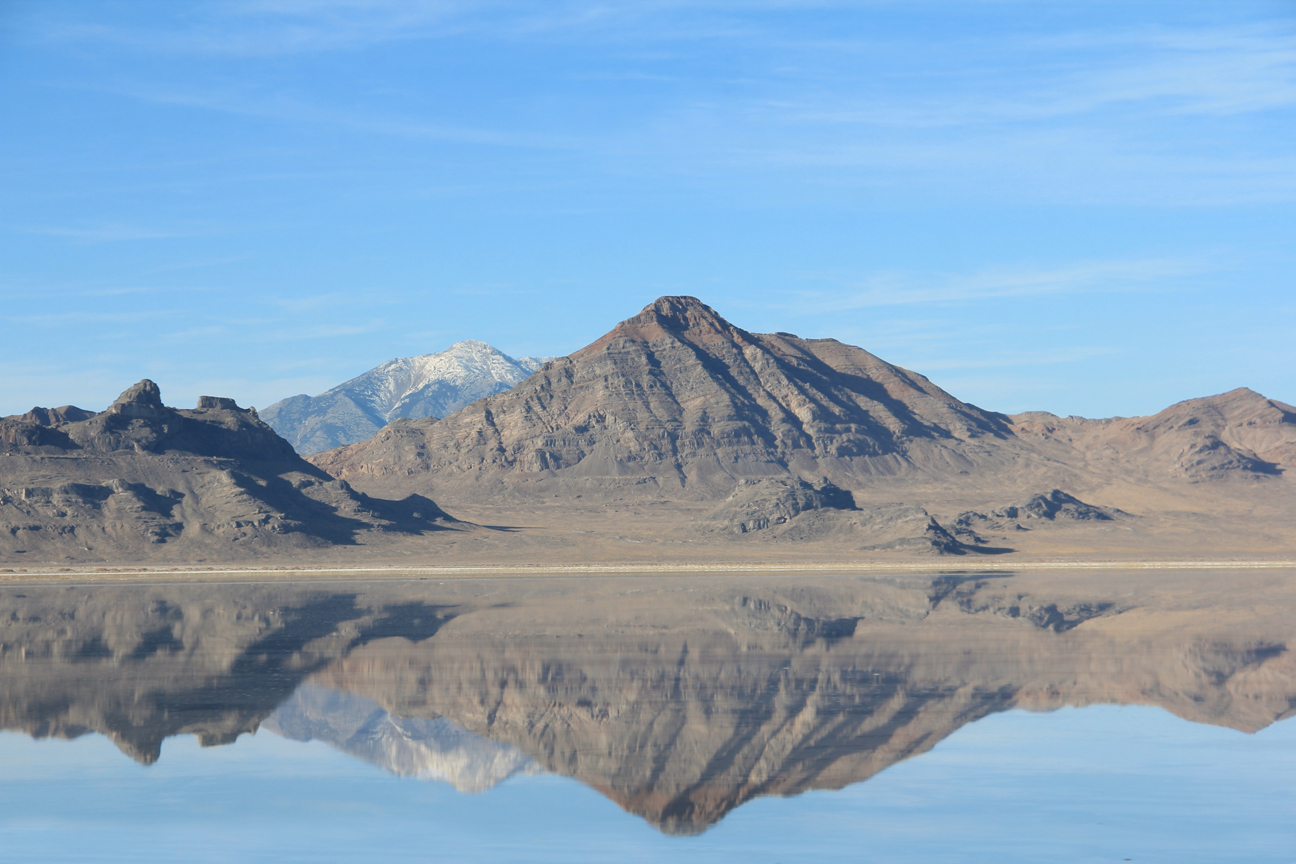
Rishel Peak

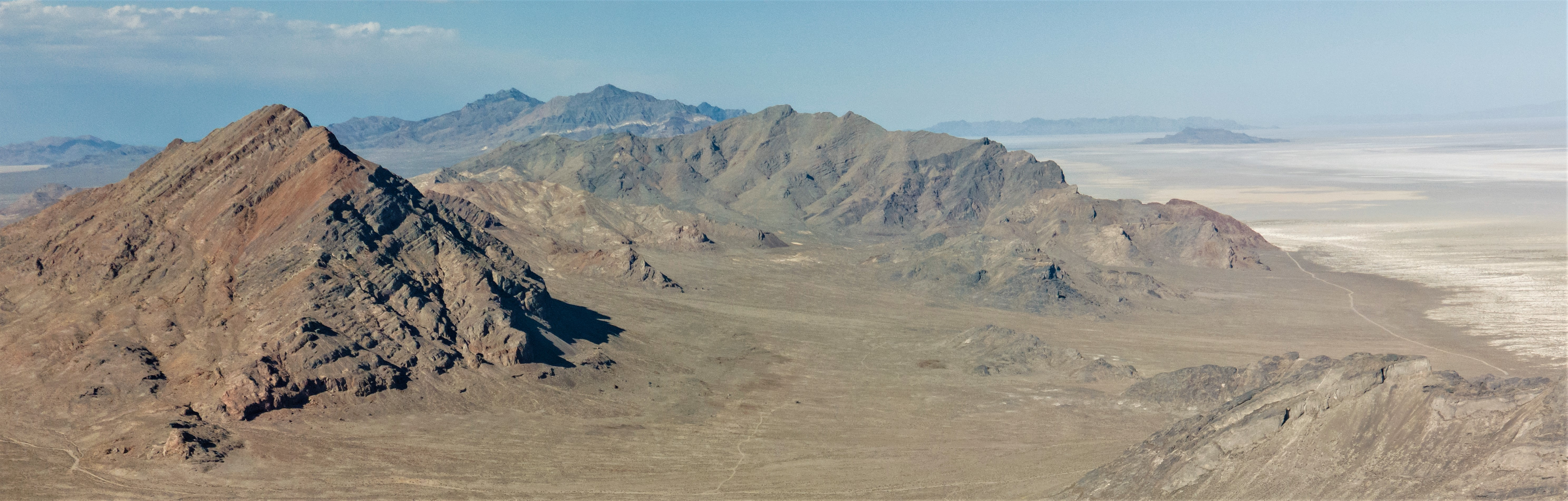
Rishel Peak (left) and Tetzlaff Peak (center) seen from Volcano Peak.
Further in the distance are Graham Peak and Jenkins Peak.

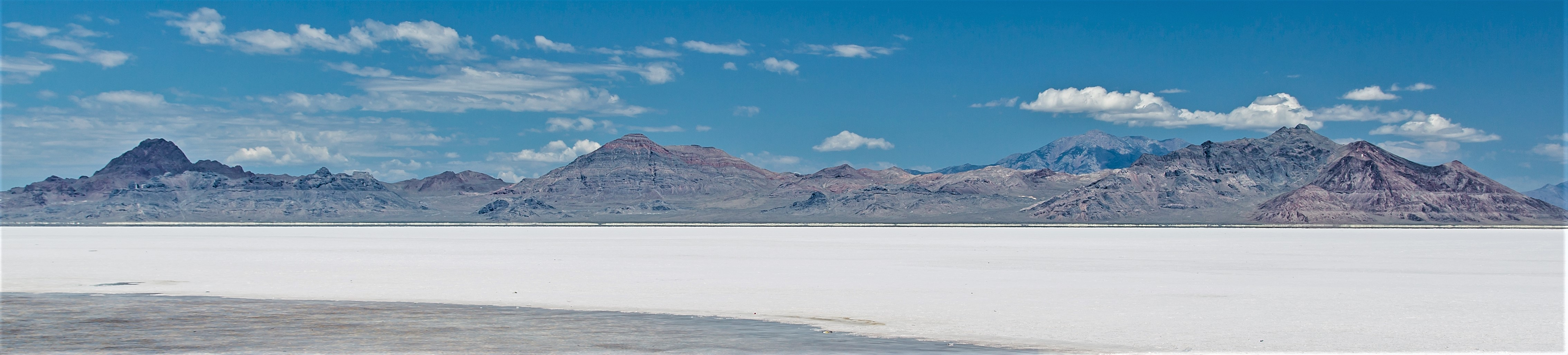
Volcano Peak (left), Rishel Peak (left of center) and Tetzlaff Peak (right) from Bonneville Salt Flats

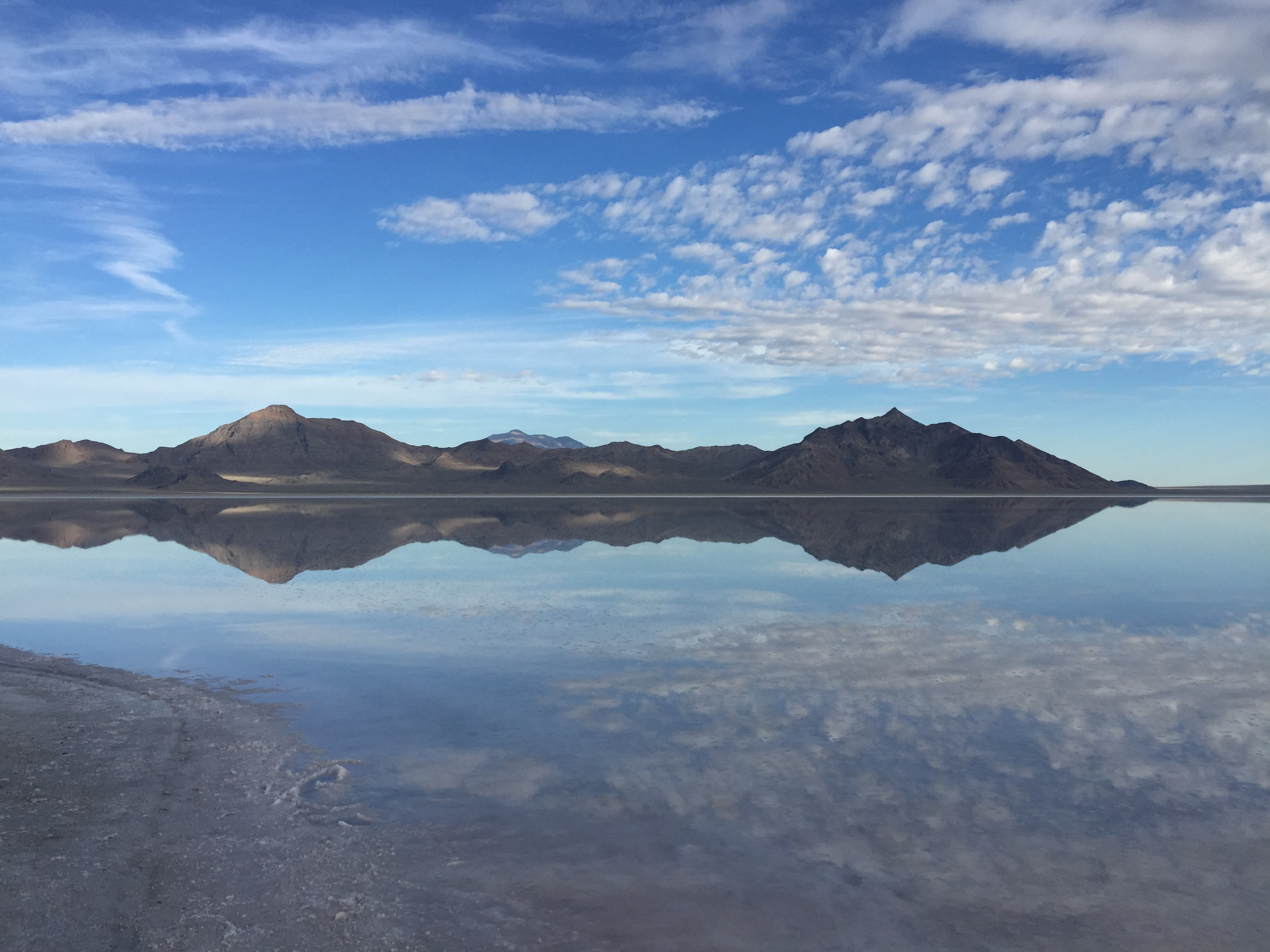
Rishel Peak (left) and Tetzlaff Peak (right)

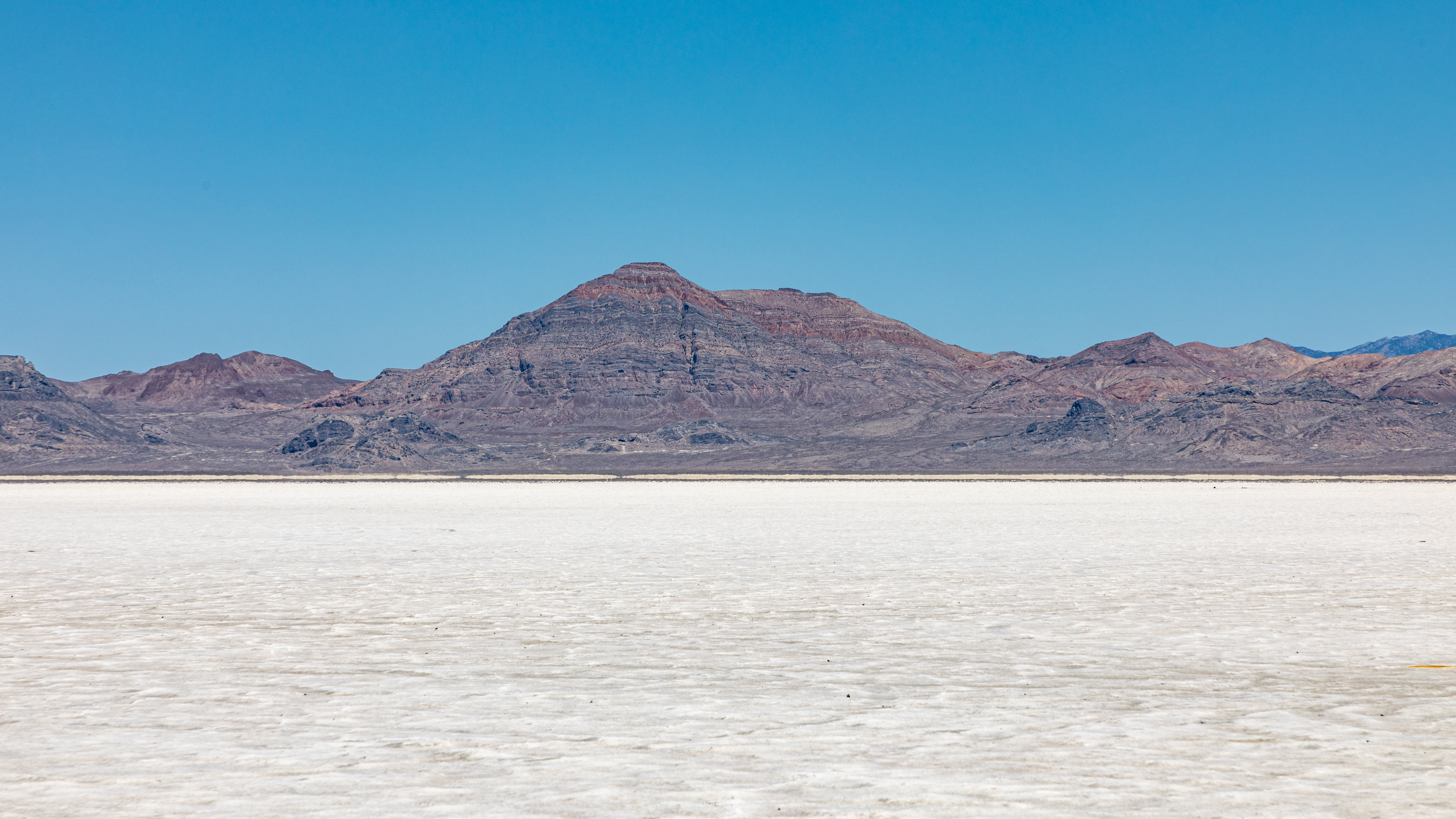
Rishel Peak

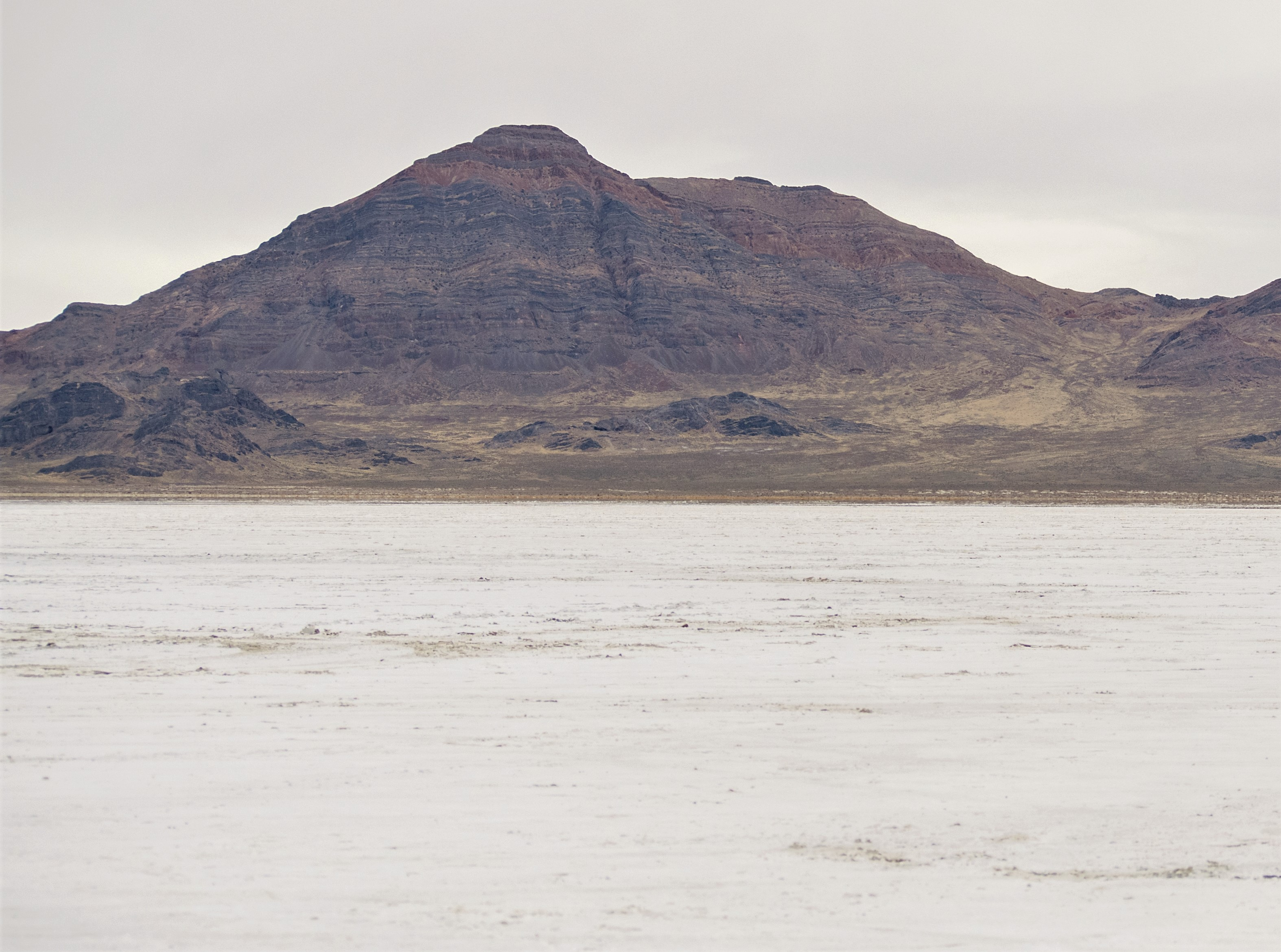
Rishel Peak from Bonneville Salt Flats

== See also ==
- List of mountain peaks of Utah
