= Dale Sturtz =

American politician (1938–2015)

Member of the Indiana House of Representatives from the 52nd district
- In office November 4, 1992 – November 6, 2002
- Preceded by: Keith Bulen
- Succeeded by: Marlin Stutzman

Personal details
- Born: July 22, 1938 Cumberland, Maryland, U.S.
- Died: July 24, 2015 (aged 77) LaGrange, Indiana, U.S.
- Party: Democratic
- Education: National Sheriffs Institute; Federal Bureau of Investigation National Academy
- Occupation: Politician

W. Dale Sturtz (July 22, 1938 – July 24, 2015) was an American politician.

Born in Cumberland, Maryland, Sturtz attended the National Sheriffs Institute and the Federal Bureau of Investigation National Academy. Sturtz then served as sheriff of LaGrange County, Indiana from 1980 to 1990. He then served on the LaGrange County Council from 1990 to 1992. From 1992 to 2002, Sturtz served in the Indiana House of Representatives as a Democrat. Sturtz lived in Howe, Indiana. He also worked as a private investigator. Sturtz died in LaGrange, Indiana.
