= Fire art =

Piece of art that uses active flames

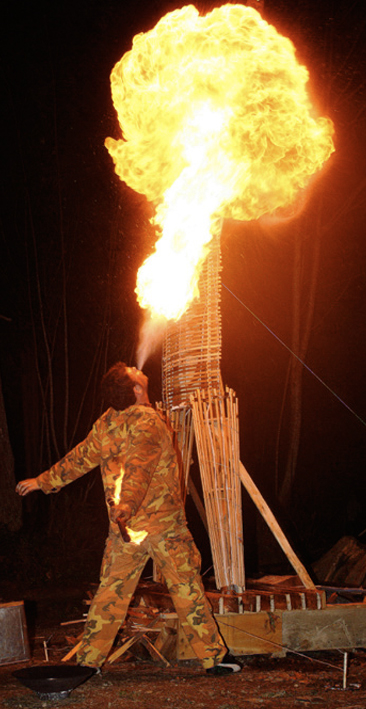
Dragon's breath (sustained vertical breath without a torch in front of the flame)

Fire art is a piece of art that uses active flames as an essential part of the piece. The piece may either use flame effects as part of a sculpture, or be a choreographed performance of fire effects as the piece burns; the latter being almost a type of performance art.

Fire can be a compelling medium for artists and viewers. It has a direct effect on its surroundings, consuming materials and giving heat and light. It is constantly moving and can appear to be alive. There is also the inherent perceived danger of fire.

Fire artists use various fuels and colorants to achieve desired effects. The choice of fuel is largely dependent on the effects desired. In large stationary pieces, propane gas is a popular fuel. Gas escaping from its container can be set alight. Different plumbing, pressures, nozzles alter the nature of the flames. Controlling how the propane mixes with the oxygen in the air is important.

Liquid fuels like alcohol, methanol, kerosene, mixes of kerosene and diesel, and others, can produce spectacular results. Extra precautions must be taken with liquids because they fall and splash, while gasses usually dissipate.

Most colorants are solids ground into a powder. As the powder is heated, it begins to oxidize and burns a color particular to the chemical used. Some colorants can be dissolved in alcohol or water or other liquids to facilitate their dispersion in the fire. Some colorants are toxic and should not be used in proximity to people.

== See also ==
- Burning Man
- Fire Arts Festival
- Fire performance
- Flaming Lotus Girls
