= Bonneville Salt Flats =

Salt pan in northwestern Utah

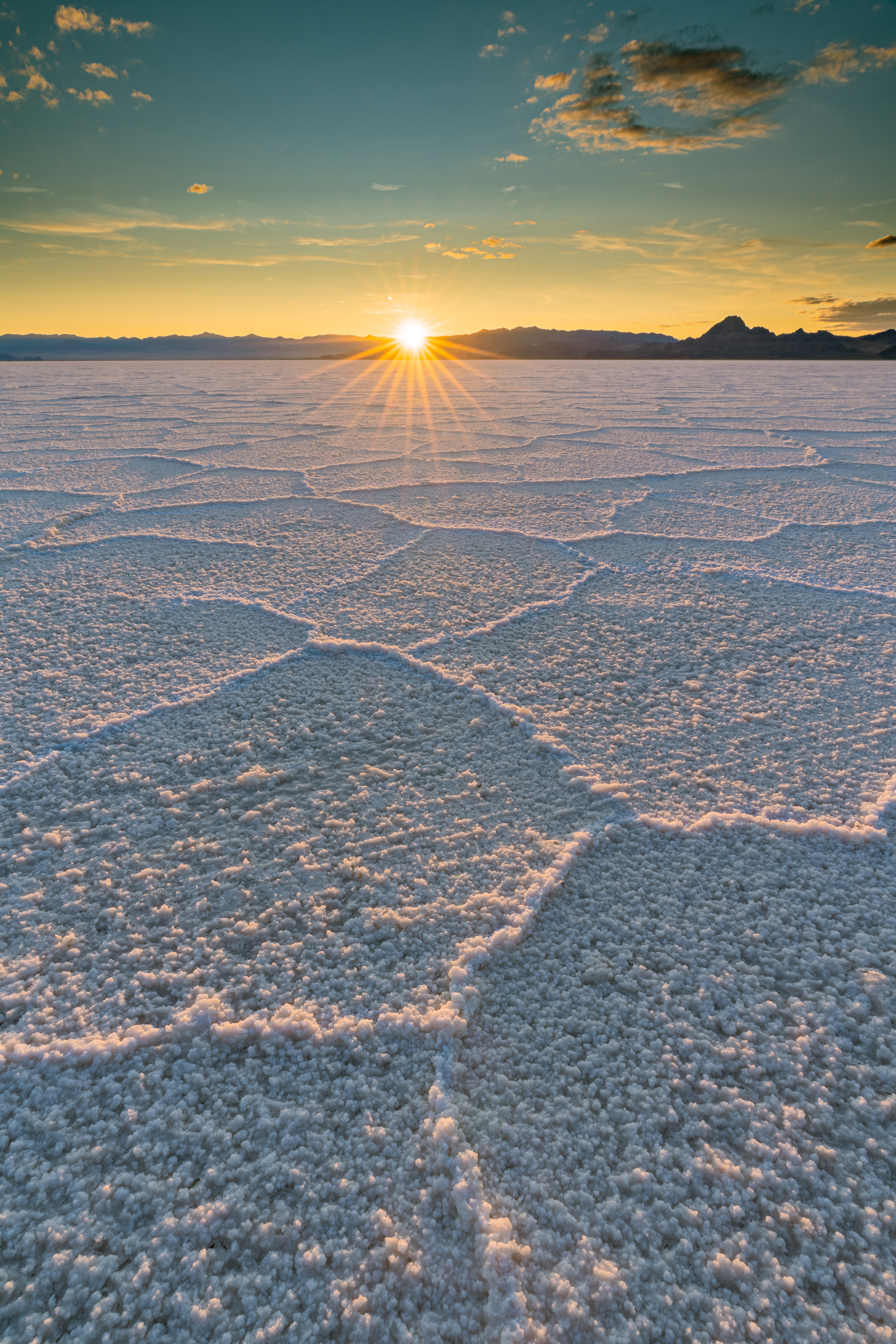
- Sunset at the Bonneville Salt Flats in 2015. Unique hexagon patterns are formed by the freezing and thawing of brackish waters.

- Location within Utah
- Floor elevation: 1,291 m (4,236 ft)
- Length: 12 mi (19 km)
- Width: 5 mi (8.0 km)
- Area: 40 mi^{2} (100 km^{2})

Geography
- Country: United States
- State: Utah
- County: Tooele
- Borders on: Interstate 80 in Utah (south); West Wendover, Nevada (west)
- Coordinates: 40°48′N 113°48′W
- Interactive map of Bonneville Salt Flats

The Bonneville Salt Flats are a densely packed salt pan in Tooele County in northwestern Utah, United States. A remnant of the Pleistocene Lake Bonneville, it is the largest of many salt flats west of the Great Salt Lake. It is public land managed by the Bureau of Land Management (BLM) and is known for land speed records at the Bonneville Speedway. The flats are open to the public.

The salt flats are about 12 miles (19 km) long and 5 miles (8 km) wide, with a crust almost 5 ft (1.5m) thick at the center and less than one inch (2.5 cm) towards the edges. It is estimated to hold 147 million tons of salt, about 90% of which is halite from which table salt is derived.

== History ==
Geologist Grove Karl Gilbert named the area after Benjamin Bonneville, a U.S. Army officer who explored the Intermountain West in the 1830s. In 1907, Bill Rishel and two local businessmen tested the suitability of the salt for driving by taking a Pierce-Arrow onto its surface. A railway line across the flats was completed in 1910, marking the first permanent crossing. The first land speed record was set there in 1914 by Teddy Tetzlaff.

The Pontiac Bonneville (former flagship sedan of the Pontiac motor division), the Triumph Bonneville motorcycle, and the Bonneville International media company are all named for the flats. Several movies and television shows have included scenes shot at the flats, including Walking with Dinosaurs Special - The Ballad of Big Al, Knight Rider, Warlock, Independence Day and its sequel, SLC Punk!, Cremaster 2 from Cremaster Cycle, The Brown Bunny, The World's Fastest Indian, Gerry, The Tree of Life, Top Gear and Pirates of the Caribbean: At World's End.

The Bonneville Salt Flats hosts the annual US Flight Archery Championships. The goal of flight archery is to shoot arrows from bows at the greatest distance possible. The 1977 (archer Don Brown) and 1982 (archer Alan Webster) world records were set there.

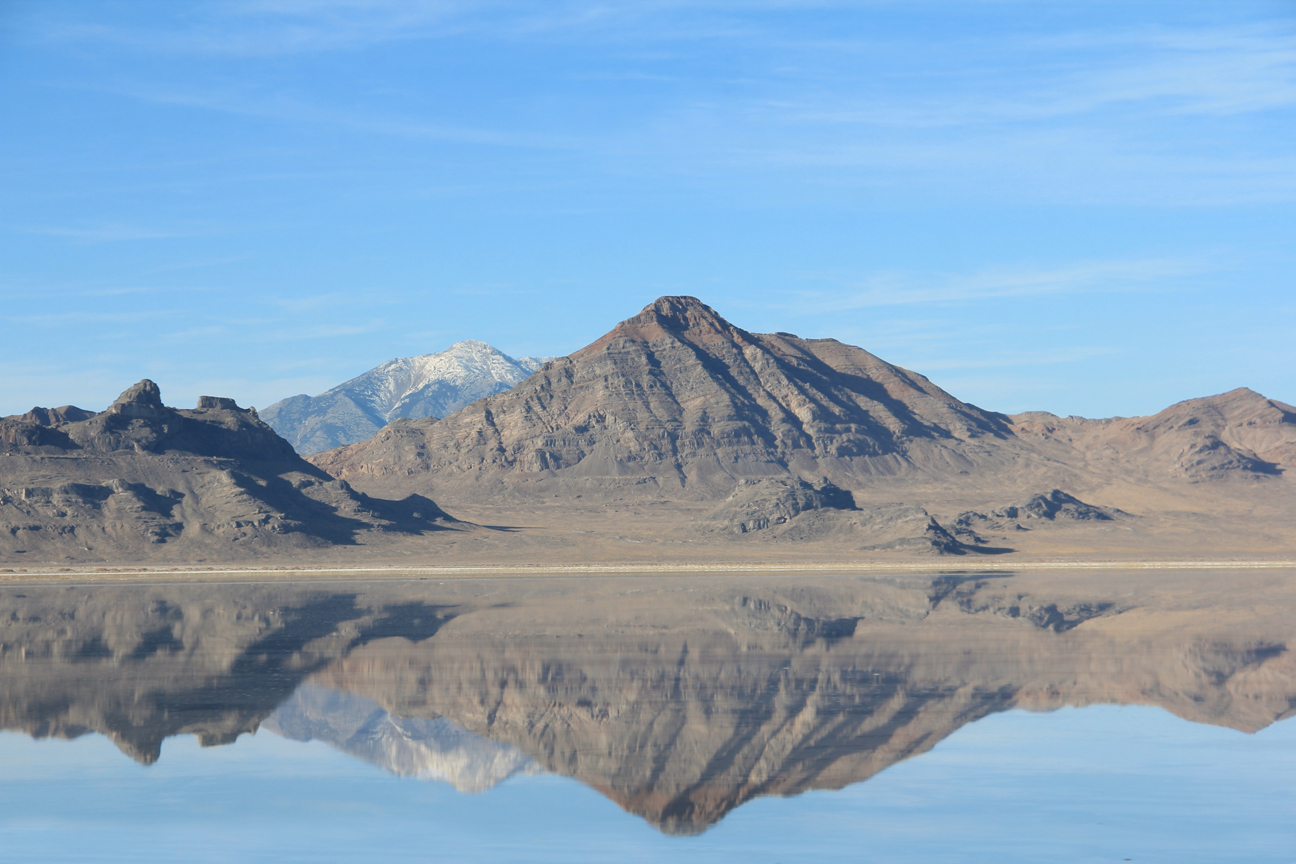
Bonneville Salt Flats during the winter has about 1 inch of water on it. (Rishel Peak shown).

== Environmental concerns ==
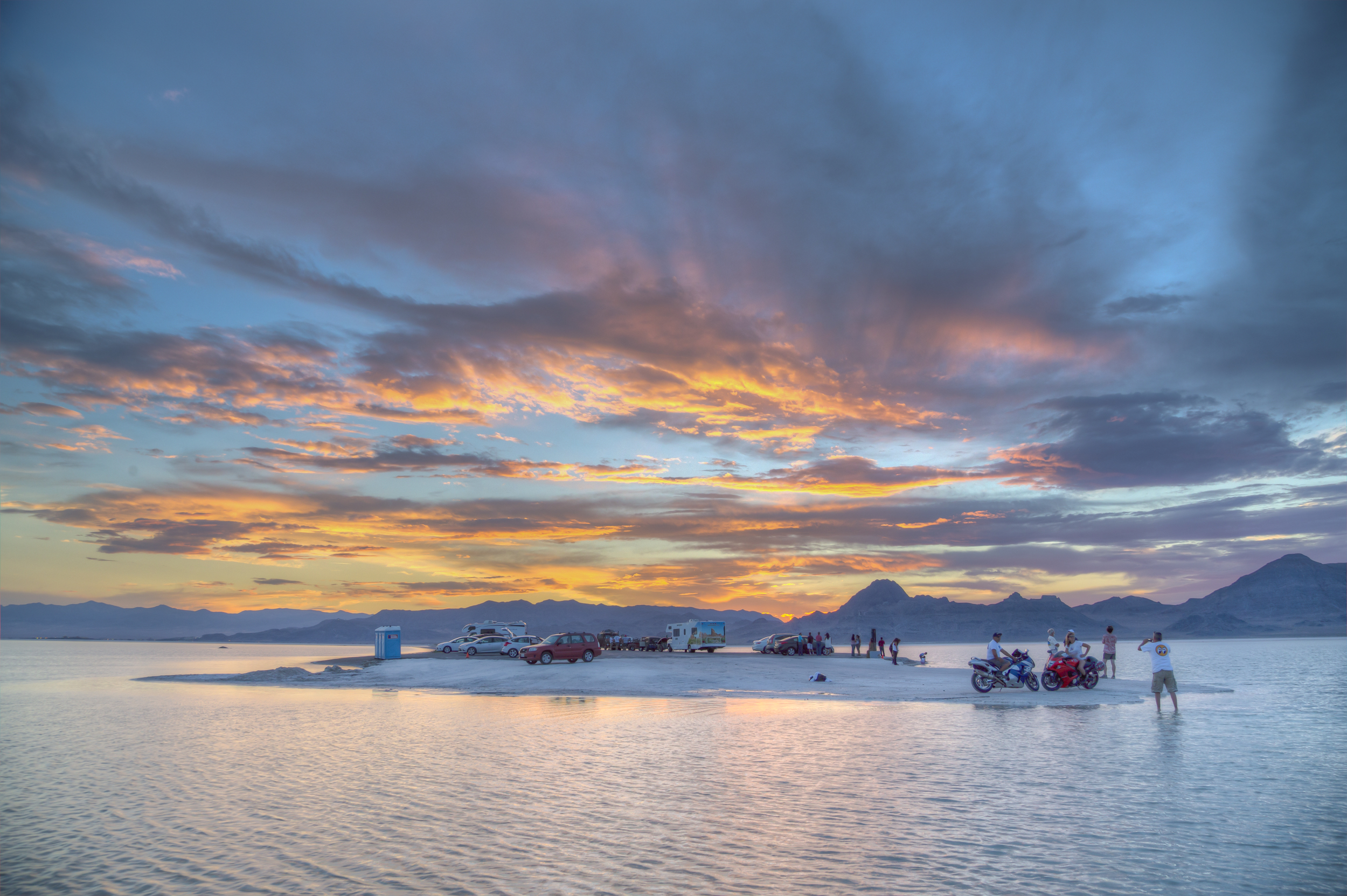
Visitors at the Bonneville Salt Flats

The thickness of salt crust is a critical factor in racing use of the salt flats. The BLM has undertaken multiple studies on the topic; while a 2007 study determined that there was little change in the crust's thickness from 1988 to 2003, more recent studies have shown a reduction in thickness, especially in the northwest area where racing occurs. The flats' overall area has contracted over the past several decades. Many believe nearby evaporative potash mining is the primary factor.

A 2025 study combining satellite imagery from 1984 to 2024 with aerial photography and a 1925 map estimated that the flats' halite crust area had declined by about 75% since 1925, at a rate of 0.75 to 1.45 km^{2} (0.29 to 0.56 sq mi) per year, and projected that the crust could disappear between 2072 and 2126.

Collaboration between racing organizations, the potash mine, and the BLM led to a pilot program begun in 1998 to release excess brine onto the salt flats during winter. Plans to increase the volume of brine returned to the salt flats are hoped to halt loss of crust thickness, or possibly restore it where it has become too thin to sustain human use.

== Land speed events ==
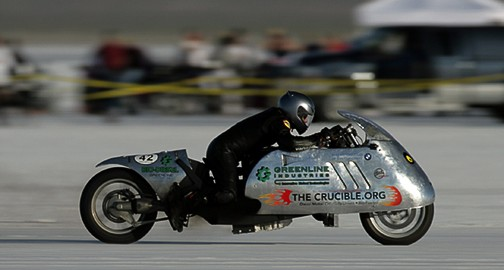
Michael Sturtz setting world motorcycle land speed record using 100% biodiesel, 2007

Land speed records and land speed racing records have been set many times on the Bonneville Salt Flats. The record for wheel-driven vehicles (449 MPH) was set there in 2018 and for rocket or jet propelled vehicles (630 MPH; since superseded) in 1970.

Motorcar racing has taken place at the salt flats since 1914. Racing takes place at part of the Bonneville Salt Flats known as the Bonneville Speedway. There are five major land speed events that take place at the Bonneville Salt Flats. Bonneville "Speed Week" takes place mid-August followed by "World of Speed" in September; the "World Finals" take place early October. These three events welcome cars, trucks, and motorcycles. The "Bub Motorcycle Speed Trials" are for motorcycles only. World records are contested at the Mike Cook ShootOut in September.

The Southern California Timing Association and the Utah Salt Flats Racing Association organize the multi-vehicle events, but all event promoters contribute to prepping and maintaining the salt. "Speed Week" events in August were canceled in 2015 and 2022 due to the poor condition of the salt in certain parts of the flats. The salt flats had been swamped by heavy rains earlier in the year, as usual, but the rains also triggered mudslides from surrounding mountains onto a section of the flats used for the land-speed racing courses.

== Stardust ==
In 2004, the Stardust spacecraft released its sample-return capsule for a landing in the Bonneville Salt Flats after its flybys of asteroid 5535 Annefrank in 2002 and comet Wild 2 in 2004.

== See also ==
- Black Rock Desert in Nevada, another land-speed record test ground
- List of vehicle speed records
