= Dust & Illusions =

- Directed by: Olivier Bonin
- Written by: Olivier Bonin
- Produced by: Olivier Bonin; Didier Leclerc
- Narrated by: Tom Kennedy
- Cinematography: Olivier Bonin
- Edited by: Arthur Guibert
- Music by: Samuel Fajner
- Release date: March 28, 2009 (USA)
- Running time: 80 minutes
- Countries: France, USA
- Language: English
- Budget: $138,000

Dust & Illusions is a 2009 documentary film about Burning Man and its founders. The film has been featured at several film festivals, and was shown at the San Francisco DocFest at The Roxie in San Francisco in October 2009. The film was written and directed by Olivier Bonin.

The film discusses the history of Burning Man, such as its 1970s counter-culture foundations, and its origins on Baker Beach in 1986. The film also documents its contemporary development. Dust & Illusions uses archival footage and interviews, such as with founder Larry Harvey.
