= The Crucible (art school) =

Art school in Oakland, California, US

Coordinates: 37°48′17″N 122°17′27″W

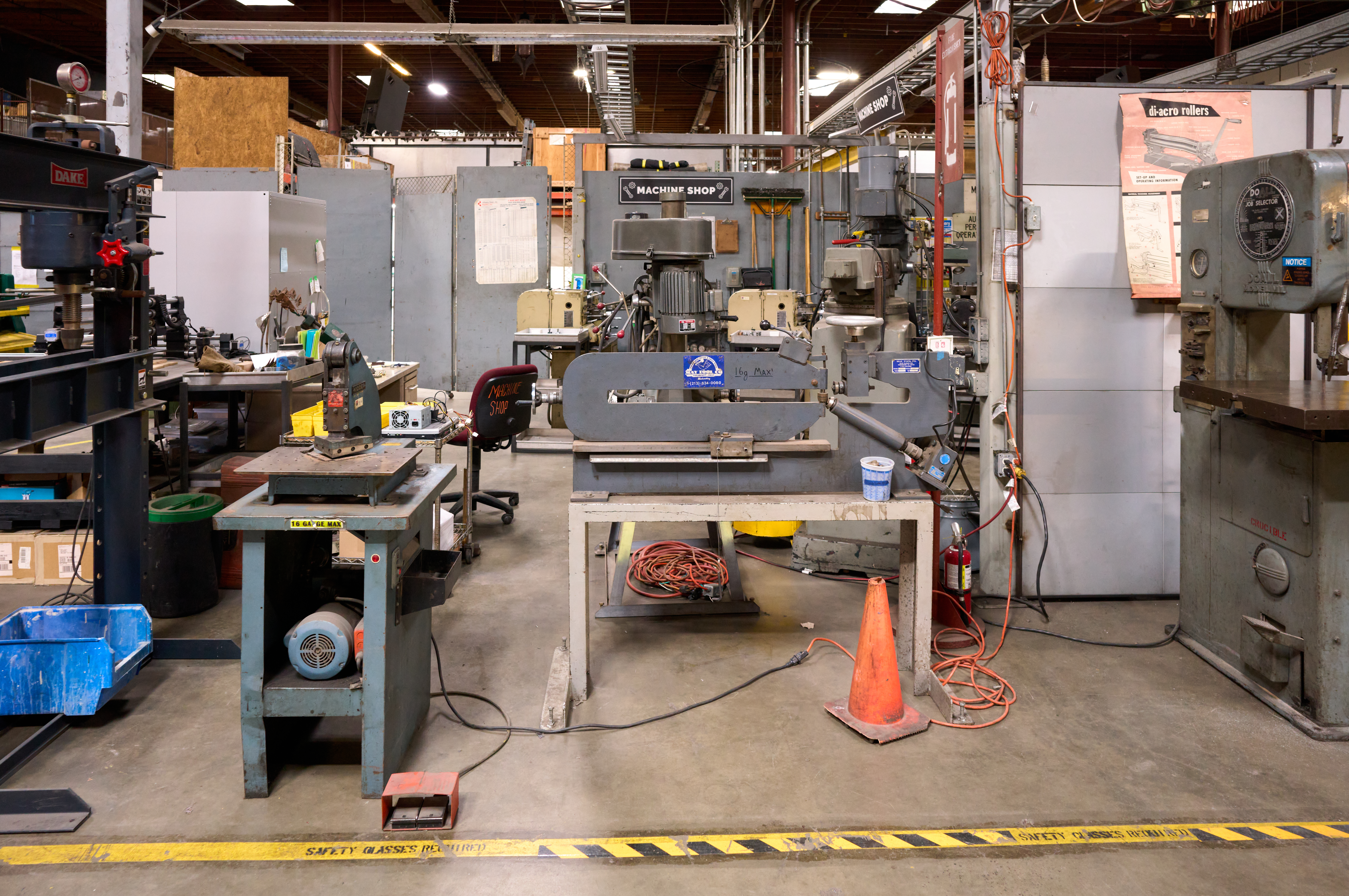
Interior of The Crucible (2024)

The Crucible is a nonprofit industrial arts school in Oakland, California, known as the largest industrial arts education center in the United States. Its workshop was closed indefinitely due to financial hardship on October 24, 2026.

The Crucible offered classes in blacksmithing, ceramics, enameling, fire performance, foundry, glass, jewelry, electronics, machine shop, moldmaking, neon, stone working, textiles, welding, woodworking, and other industrial arts to several thousands students a year. The Crucible's Youth Program offers free classes and workshops to West Oakland kids.

== History ==
The Crucible was founded in 1999 by Michael Sturtz and a small group of friends. Established in Berkeley in 1999, the institution was moved to West Oakland in 2003.

In the 2010s, the Crucible organized the Fire Arts Festival as a fundraising event. The festival featured open-air exhibits of fire art and performances. The first Fire Arts Festival was held in 1999. The last festival was held in 2009 on the former Oakland Army Base.

According to the Oaklandside, the Crucible started facing significant financial challenges after the Covid-19 pandemic, due to some funders prioritizing other causes, building issues that prevented classes from taking place and insufficient revenues from classes and corporate events.

In 2025, Crucible workers announced they were unionizing. In October 2026, the Crucible closed its workshop for an undetermined amount of time.

== Mission and programming ==
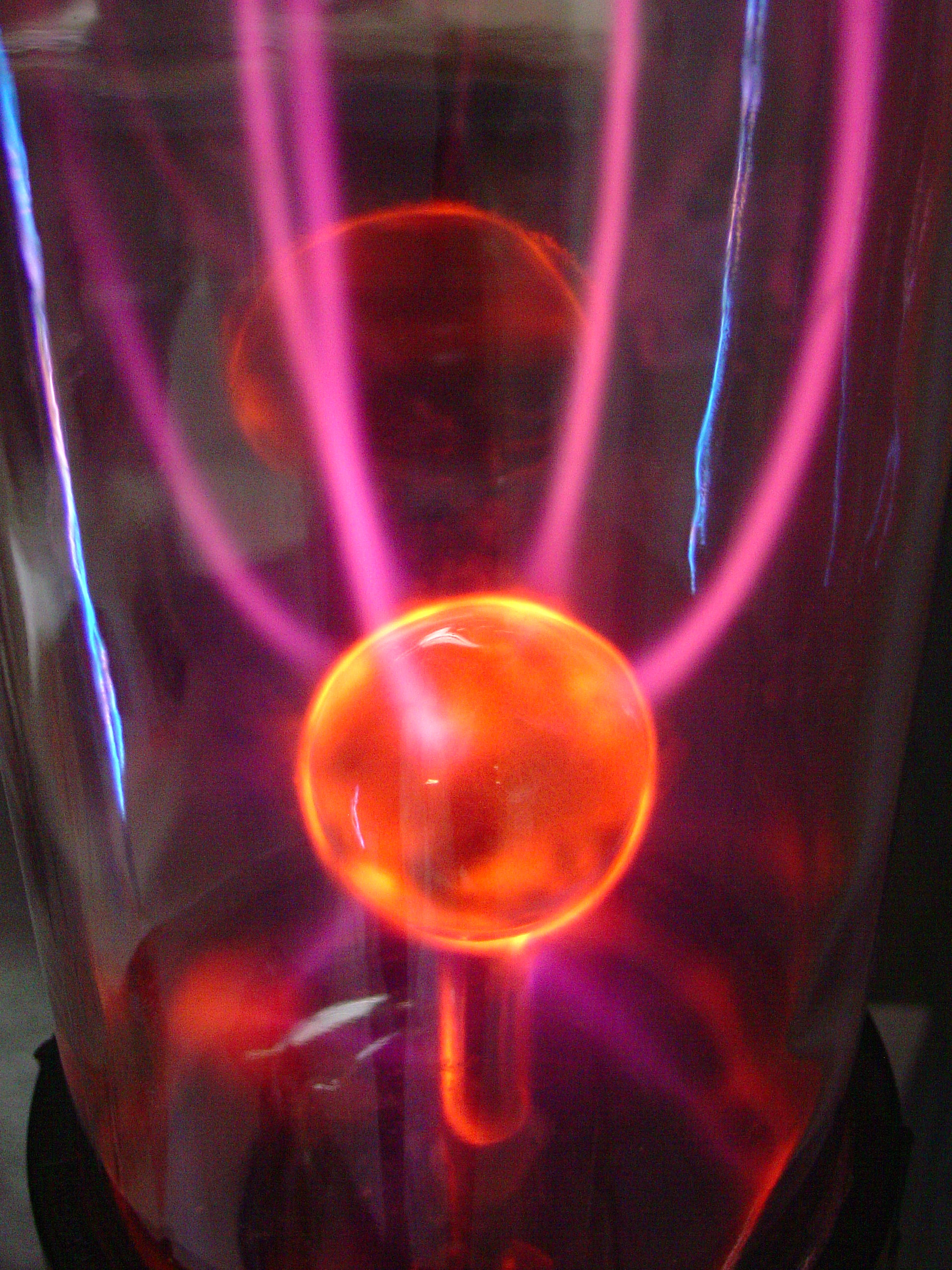
Plasma art at The Crucible (2008)

Besides industrial arts classes, the Crucible is known for its youth and outreach program, bicycle fixing programs and large scale artistic events featuring fire performances. It also provides access to space and tools to local artists.

=== Youth and outreach programs ===
The workshop gives West Oakland youth hands on experience to learn about bike mechanics. The Crucible holds 'Bike Fix-a-thon' workshops where youth and their families can learn about bike maintenance and safety.

=== Educational Response Vehicle (ERV) ===
The Crucible's Educational Response Vehicle (ERV) is a 1960 International Harvester fire engine, modified to a demonstration platform for industrial and fire arts. ERV can demonstrate blacksmithing, arc welding, oxy-acetylene torch cutting and glass flameworking.

== Die Moto ==
Die Moto was a project supported by the Crucible, aiming to build a custom-built performance diesel motorcycle that set the world speed record for diesel motorcycles at 130.614 mph in 2007. Capable of running on diesel, biodiesel, or straight vegetable oil (SVO) fuels, Die Moto was designed and fabricated at The Crucible by a team of vehicle enthusiasts, engineers and artisans. The Die Moto team wanted to prove the viability of alternative fuel technology in performance vehicles. The team of volunteers, known as The Diesel Dozen, crafted Die Moto from BMW R1150RT motorcycle parts, and a high performance BMW diesel engine.
